= List of free educational software =

This is a list of free educational software, including software, web applications, and other digital tools used for teaching and learning computational mathematics, science, programming, language skills, and other skills. Listed software is free software and open-source software or freemium.

== Computational mathematics ==
=== Computer algebra systems ===
- Axiom
- CoCoA
- FriCAS
- GAP
- KAlgebra
- Mathomatic
- Maxima
- PARI/GP
- Reduce
- SageMath
- SymPy
- Xcas
- Yacas

=== Interactive geometry ===
- C.a.R.
- CaRMetal
- Cinderella
- Desmos
- DrGeo
- GeoGebra
- Kig

=== Numerical computing and modelling ===
- Cantor
- Euler Mathematical Toolbox
- Genius
- GNU Octave
- Scilab

=== Plotting and data analysis ===
- Gnuplot
- Grace
- Grapher
- KmPlot
- LabPlot
- Matplotlib
- PLplot
- ROOT
- SciDAVis

=== Calculators ===
- KCalc
- Qalculate!
- WRPN Calculator

=== Statistics ===
- gretl
- jamovi
- JASP
- PSPP
- RStudio
- SOFA Statistics

=== Specialised mathematics tools ===
- Sage Manifolds
- WebMathematics Interactive

=== Mathematical notation and LaTeX ===
- CoCalc
- GNU TeXmacs
- LibreOffice Math
- LyX
- Overleaf

=== Cryptography ===
- CrypTool

=== Mathematical visualisations ===
- Logo
- Manim

=== Mathematical spreadsheets ===
- Gnumeric
- Google Sheets
- LibreOffice Calc
- Microsoft Excel
- Numbers (spreadsheet)

=== Other ===
- MathOverflow
- MathWorld
- Microsoft Math Solver
- Wolfram Alpha

== Computational science ==
=== Astronomy ===
- Cartes du Ciel
- Celestia
- Gaia Sky
- KStars
- Stellarium
- WorldWide Telescope
- Xplanet

=== Anatomy ===
- 3D Slicer
- Anatomography

=== Biology ===
- Avogadro
- CellProfiler
- Fiji (software)
- ImageJ
- Jmol
- NetLogo
- UCSF Chimera

=== Chemistry ===
- Chemfig
- Ghemical
- JChemPaint
- Kalzium
- XDrawChem

=== Physics and simulation ===
- Algodoo
- PhET Interactive Simulations
- Step
- Elmer FEM solver
- Meep
- OpenFOAM

=== Geography and GIS ===
- GRASS GIS
- Marble
- QGIS

== Reading and literacy ==
- Bookshare
- Calibre
- ePathshala
- Hoopla
- Kiwix
- KLettres
- Libby
- Okular
- Open Library
- Project Gutenberg
- Wikipedia mobile app
- Zotero
- MyQuest

== Computational writing ==
- CoCalc
- GNU TeXmacs
- LyX
- Overleaf
- Texmaker
- TeXstudio
- Wikipedia:Sandbox

== Chatbots ==
- ChatGPT
- Gemini
- Microsoft Copilot
- Khanmigo

== Foreign language learning ==
- 50Languages
- Duolingo
- KHangMan
- Kiten
- KLettres

== Political science and civics ==
=== Civic technology and participation ===
- Alaveteli
- Decidim
- FixMyStreet
- LiquidFeedback
- Loomio
- Pol.is
- Ushahidi

=== Political data and public affairs ===
- CiviCRM
- Gephi
- GovTrack
- Public Whip
- TheyWorkForYou
- Vote Smart

== Programming ==
=== Educational programming languages and environments ===
- Alice
- Basic-256
- Blockly
- BlueJ
- Ch
- Etoys
- Greenfoot
- Hackety Hack
- IDLE
- JFLAP
- Kojo
- Logo
- Microsoft Small Basic
- MIT App Inventor
- Pencil Code
- Racket
- Raptor
- RUR-PLE
- Scratch
- ScratchJr
- Snap!
- Smalltalk
- Sonic Pi
- Squeak
- Thonny
- Toolbox
- Turtle graphics
- Turtlestitch
- UCBLogo
- Wikitext Sandbox

=== Open-source AI-assisted software development tools ===
Hosted

- Cline
- Codex CLI
- DeepSeek Coder
- DeepSeek Harness
- goose
- Hermes Agent
- Kilo Code
- Kimi Code
- Oh My Pi
- OpenCode
- OpenHands
- Pi

Locally hosted inference

- Llama.cpp
- MLX LM
- Ollama
- vLLM

=== Free text editors ===
- Acme
- Bluefish
- Brackets
- Crimson Editor
- GNU Emacs
- FeatherPad
- Geany
- gedit
- GNOME Text Editor
- GNU nano
- jEdit
- Kate
- KWrite
- Neovim
- Notepad++
- PSPad
- SciTE
- Textadept
- TextMate
- Vim
- Visual Studio Code
- Zed

=== Programming education platforms ===
- Codecademy
- Code.org
- Exercism
- FreeCodeCamp
- LeetCode

=== Competitive programming platforms ===
- Advent of Code
- CodeChef
- Codeforces
- Codewars
- HackerRank
- Project Euler
- SPOJ
- Topcoder
- UVa Online Judge

=== Creative coding ===
- Manim
- openFrameworks
- P5.js
- Processing
- Pure Data
- SuperCollider

=== Online IDE environments ===
- Google Colab
- Kaggle

== Data science and machine learning ==
- ELKI
- Google Colab
- Kaggle
- KNIME
- Orange
- Tanagra
- Weka

== Artificial intelligence ==
- Gazebo (simulator)
- NLTK
- Robot Operating System

== Video editing ==
- Blender Video Sequence Editor (VSE)
- Clipchamp
- DaVinci Resolve
- Flowblade
- iMovie
- Kdenlive
- Lightworks
- OpenShot Video Editor
- Pitivi
- Shotcut

== Educational streaming ==
- Academic Earth
- Kanopy
- Khan Academy
- OpenLearn
- SWAYAM
- YouTube

== Aviation training ==
=== Flight simulators ===
- Digital Combat Simulator
- FlightGear

=== Air traffic control simulation ===
- International Virtual Aviation Organisation
- Virtual Air Traffic Simulation Network

== Digital fabrication and design ==
=== 3D printing software ===
- AstroPrint
- Cura
- FreeCAD
- Klipper
- Marlin
- MeshLab
- OctoPrint
- OpenSCAD
- PrusaSlicer
- Repetier-Host
- Slic3r
- Tinkercad

=== Computer-aided manufacturing ===
- FreeCAD
- LinuxCNC

=== Computer-aided design ===
- Blender
- FreeCAD
- LeoCAD
- LibreCAD
- QCAD
- Sketchup Free
- SolveSpace
- Sweet Home 3D

=== Electronic design automation ===
- Electric
- Fritzing
- gEDA
- Icarus Verilog
- KiCad
- Magic
- Ngspice
- Qucs
- Verilator

== Digital art and graphics ==
- Adobe Fresco
- Affinity
- Blender
- GIMP
- Inkscape
- Krita
- MyPaint
- Pencil2D

== Audio and music ==
=== Digital audio workstations ===
- Ardour
- GarageBand
- LMMS
- MusE
- Qtractor
- Rosegarden

=== Other audio and music software ===
- Audacity
- Audiveris
- Denemo
- EarSketch
- GNU Solfege
- Hydrogen
- Impro-Visor
- LilyPond
- MuseScore
- TuxGuitar

== Computational photography ==
- Darktable
- Hugin
- ImageJ
- RawTherapee

== Game development ==
- Godot
- GDevelop
- Unigine
- Unreal Engine
- Unity

== Educational games ==
- GCompris
- Pingus
- Tux, of Math Command
- Tux Paint
- Tux Typing

=== Chess ===
- Chess.com
- ChessV
- Crafty
- GNOME Chess
- GNU Chess
- Lichess
- PyChess
- Shredder
- Stockfish
- WinBoard
- XBoard

=== Go ===
- GNU Go
- Internet Go server
- KataGo
- KGS Go Server
- Leela Zero

== Learning management systems and e-learning platforms ==
- ATutor
- Canvas LMS
- Chamilo
- Claroline
- eFront
- FenixEdu
- ILIAS
- LAMS
- LON-CAPA
- Mahara
- Moodle
- OLAT
- Open edX
- OpenOLAT
- Sakai
- SWAD
- WeBWorK

== Other educational software ==
- Anki — spaced-repetition flashcard program
- Edu-sharing — open educational resource sharing platform
- EXeLearning — tool for creating digital learning content
- FET — school timetable scheduling software
- Fresh Memory — vocabulary learning flashcard tool
- GCompris — educational activity suite for children
- KDE Education Project — Cantor, KAlgebra, KmPlot, Kig, Kiten, KStars, KTouch, KLettres, Marble, Parley, Step, and more.
- Mnemosyne — spaced-repetition learning program
- Open Roberta — visual programming learning environment
- Open-Sankoré — interactive whiteboard teaching software
- Remember Me — flashcard-based memorisation tool
- REPLAY — lecture capture and learning analytics system
- SchoolTool — student information and school administration system
- UberStudent — educational Linux distribution
- Veyon — classroom computer monitoring and management software

== See also ==
- Computational education
- Educational software
- Free software
- List of homeschooling software
- List of educational software
- List of online educational resources
- List of free and open-source software packages
- Open educational resources
