= KDE Gear =

Set of applications and supporting libraries

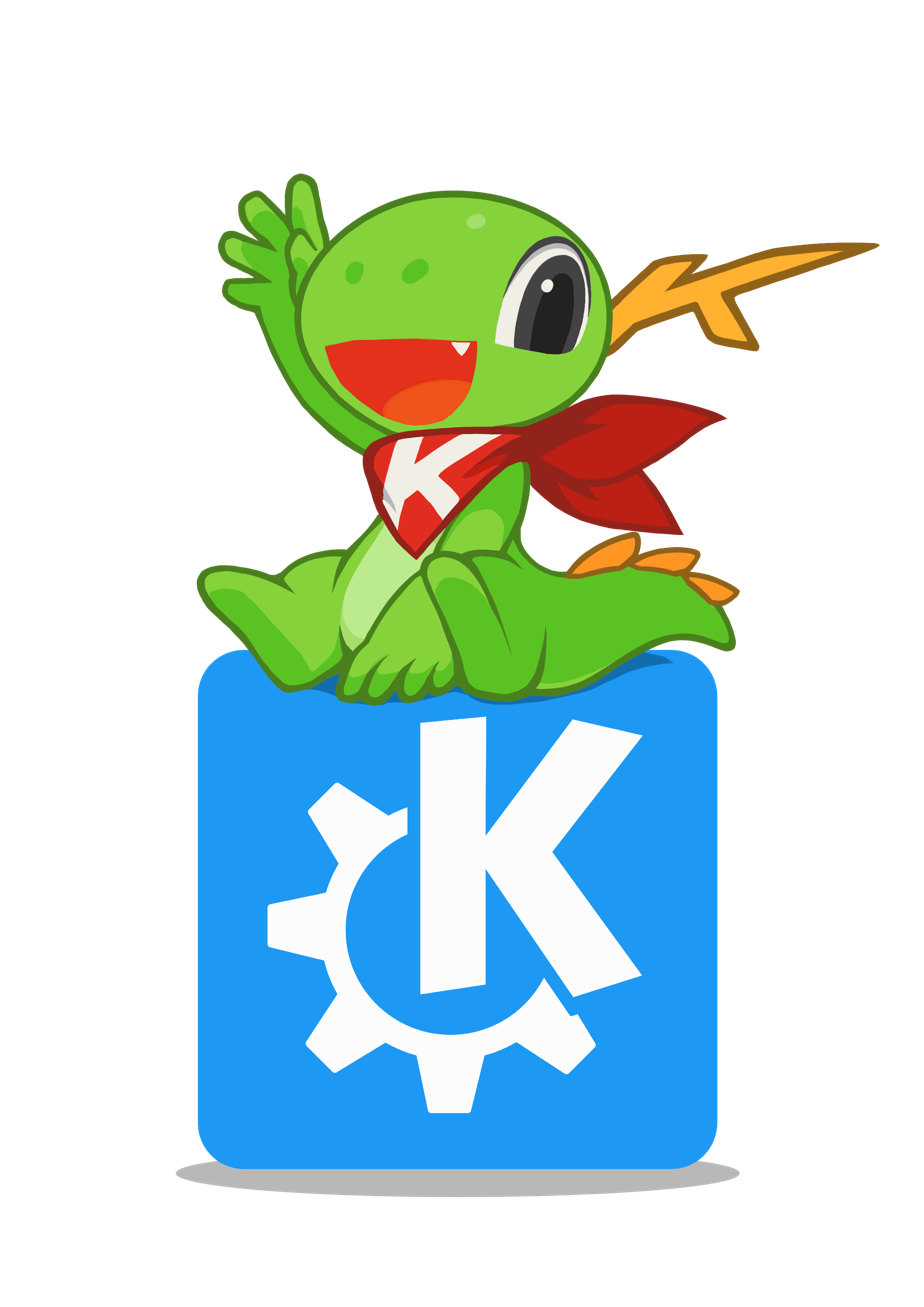
- Original author: KDE
- Developer: KDE
- Release: December 17, 2014; 11 years ago
- Stable release: 26.08 / 20 August 2026; 2 months ago
- Written in: C++, QML
- Operating system: Linux, FreeBSD, et al.
- Type: Application software
- License: GNU Lesser General Public License
- Website: apps.kde.org
- Repository: invent.kde.org

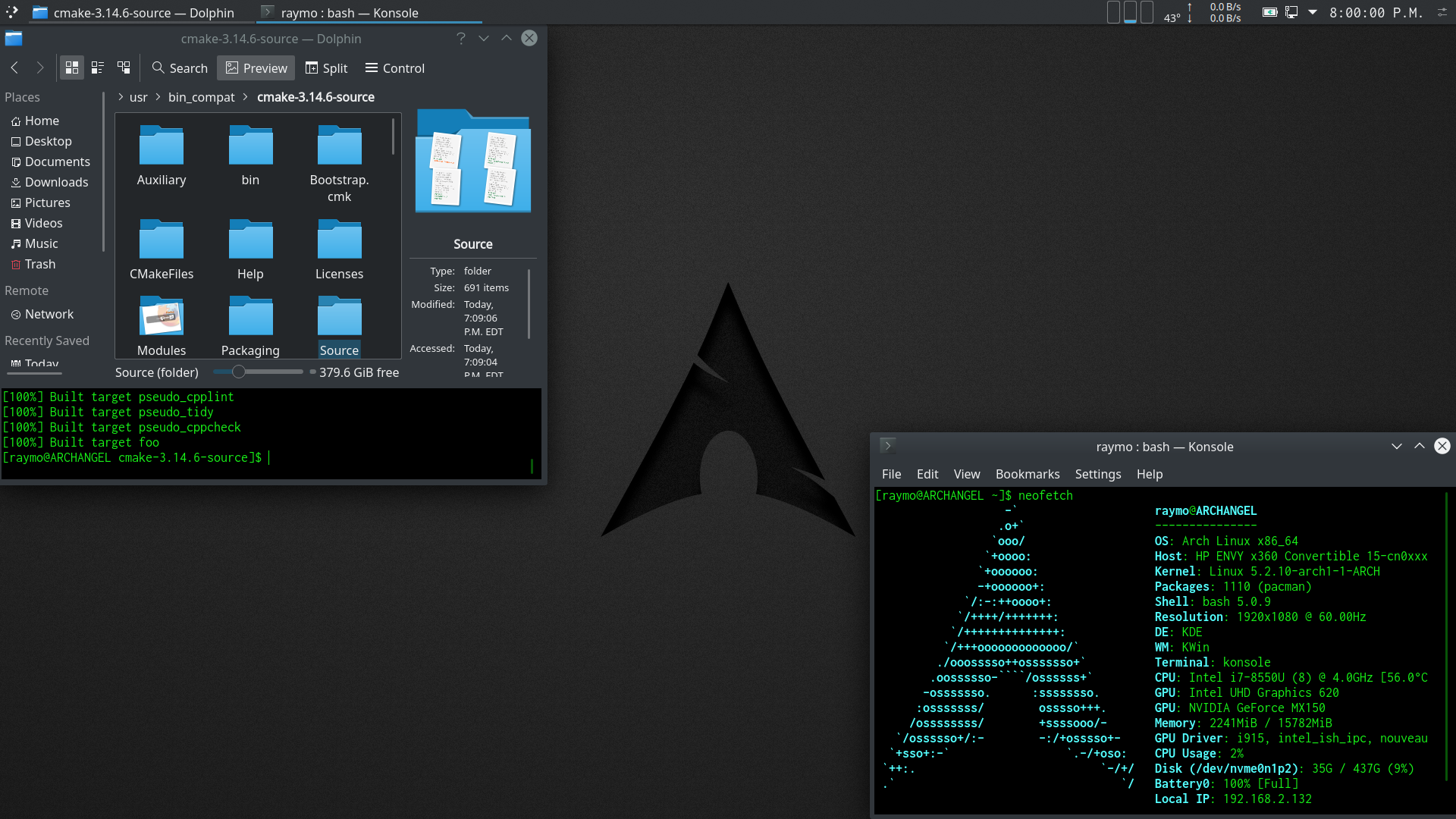
Konsole, KDE's terminal application, and Dolphin, KDE's file manager, two of KDE's core applications

The KDE Gear is a set of applications and supporting libraries that are developed by the KDE community, primarily used on Linux-based operating systems but mostly multiplatform, and released on a common release schedule.

The bundle is composed of over 200 applications. Examples of prominent applications in the bundle include the file manager Dolphin, document viewer Okular, text editor Kate, archiving tool Ark and terminal emulator Konsole.

Previously the KDE Applications Bundle was part of the KDE Software Compilation.

== Extragear ==
Software that is not part of the official KDE Applications bundle can be found in the "Extragear" section. They release on their own schedule and feature their own versioning numbers. There are many standalone applications like Krita or Amarok that are mostly designed to be portable between operating systems and deployable independent of a particular workspace or desktop environment. Some brands consist of multiple applications, such as Calligra Office Suite. There are several options for obtaining and installing KDE applications under Linux. Moreover, most of the KDE platform and applications have been ported to OpenBSD and NetBSD.

== List of applications part of the bundle ==
=== Development ===
==== Software development ====
KDE SDK is a collection of two dozen distinct integrated (both within the SDK but also with other KDE applications, e.g. many work with Dolphin, the default file manager) applications and components that work with/are part of KDevelop, and is suitable for general purpose software development in a range of languages. It provides the tooling used to engineer KDE, and is particularly rich in tools to support Qt and C++ development, as well as the more fashionable Rust, Python, etc.

- Most of the KDE SDK is available for Windows and macOS in addition to Linux and BSD.
- While created for the KDE desktop, prebuilt binary software, including nightly releases, is available for Mac OS, Linux (via AppImage, AppStream or Flathub, as well as Snap), as well as via most major Linux distributions package managers, in addition to the source code via KDE Gitlab.
- Windows installers for production/released version of Kate, KDevelop and Umbrello are available as well as via the Windows store.
  - Several KDE applications are available for Android using the Kirigami framework. built using KDevelop including KDE Connect, KDE Itinerary, a digital travel assistant that integrates train, bus, and air bookings with maps, the KDE Kalendar application, and boarding passes, and KAlgebra, a graphing scientific calculator.

Various other packages are being built for testing on Android, although plans for some of the core parts of the SDK (e.g. Kate) have not been announced.

- Unless noted, KDE applications can use KIO slaves for FTP, HTTP, FTP over SSH (SFTP), Google Drive, WebDAV, Samba (Windows shared files), archives, man, and info pages. E.g. to browse a WebDAV location, in place of the file path, webdav://www.hostname.com/path/.
- The various components can be used on their own (e.g. Kate as a general purpose text editor), or in combination (e.g. Kate uses KDiff3 internally to compare cached autorecovery file with the last saved version).
- Kate – an advanced text editor for programmers, and general text editor.
  - As of KDE 4, KEdit was replaced by Kate and Kwrite.
- KDevelop – an integrated development environment for multiple languages, with a plug-in/extension framework (e.g. plug-ins for PHP, Ruby, Python, Markdown documentation authoring/preview, a SVG viewer, etc.), and control flow viewer.
  - Supported languages include: C/C++ and ObjC (backed by the Clang/LLVM libraries)
    - Including some extra features for the Qt Framework
    - Including language support for CUDA and OpenCL
    - Qt QML and JavaScript, Python, PHP
  - In addition to the "supported" languages, there is syntax highlighting for a wide range of mark-up, configuration, programming, scripting, and data languages.
  - GUI integration with multiple different version control systems including Git, Bazaar, Subversion, CVS, Mercurial (hg), and Perforce.
  - Support for CMake and QMake, as well as generic and custom build files.
- Cervisia – CVS frontend
- KDESvn – graphical Subversion client
- KAppTemplate – Template-based code project generator
- KDiff3 – Diff/Patch frontend (see Comparison of file comparison tools)
- Kommander – Dynamic dialog editor
- Kompare – Diff/Patch frontend
- Lokalize – a computer–aided translation system
- Okteta – a hex editor
- Poxml
- Swappo
- Clazy Qt-oriented static code analyzer based on the Clang framework
- Massif Visualizer – Visualizer for Valgrind Massif data files
- Umbrello – UML diagram application
- ELF Dissector ELF binary inspector
- Fielding REST API tester
- Doxyqml Doxygen filter to allow generation of API Documentation for QML
- Heaptrack traces all memory allocations and annotates these events with stack traces.
- KDebugSettings
- KUIViewer views UI files (e.g. from Qt Designer).
- Dferry D-Bus library and tools
- CuteHMI Open-source HMI (Human Machine Interface) software written in C++ and QML.

==== Web development ====
- KImageMapEditor – an HTML image map editor
- KXSLDbg – an XSLT debugger

=== Education ===
- blinKen – computerised version of the game Simon Says
- Cantor – worksheet view to other Free Software Math packages. GUI frontend to SageMath, Maxima, R and KAlgebra
- KAlgebra – a mathematical calculator based on the MathML content markup language
- Kalzium – Displays information about the periodic table of elements
- Kanagram – customizable anagram game
- KBruch – a program for generating tasks with vulgar fractions
- KGeography – a geography learning program
- KHangMan – classic hangman game
- Kig – Program for exploring geometric constructions
- Kiten – Japanese reference/learning tool
- KLettres – Helps to learn the alphabet and then to read some syllables in different languages
- KmPlot – mathematical function plotter
- KStars – a planetarium program
- KTouch – program for learning touch typing
- KTurtle – educational programming environment using turtle graphics
- KWordQuiz
- Marble – geographical map program
- Parley – a vocabulary trainer based on the Leitner system
- Step – an interactive physics simulator

==== Science ====
- Cirkuit – An application to generate publication-ready figures
- KBibTeX – an application to manage bibliography databases in the BibTeX format
- Semantik – a mindmapping-like tool for document generation
- RKWard – an easy-to-use, transparent frontend to R
- KTechLab – an IDE for electronic and PIC microcontroller circuit design and simulation

=== Games ===
- Bomber – arcade Bombing Game
- Bovo – Five–in–a–row Board Game
- Granatier – a Bomberman clone
- KMahjongg – a Mahjong board game. Can play against robots or in multiplayer over network.
- Kapman – Pac-Man Clone
- KAtomic – a clone of the early 1990s commercial game Atomix
- KBattleship – Battleship-style game
- KBlackbox – Black–box logic game. Shoot rays into a black box to find some balls
- KBlocks – a Tetris clone
- KBounce – a JezzBall clone
- KBreakout – a Breakout type game
- KDiamond – a Bejeweled type game
- KFourInLine – Four–in–a–row board game
- KGoldrunner – Hunt gold, dodge enemies and solve puzzles
- Kigo – a Go board game
- Kiriki – a Yahtzee game
- KJumpingCube – a board game where players make boxes change color and try to succeed in taking over the board
- KMines – Minesweeper game
- KNetWalk – a puzzle game. The player must arrange sections of wire to connect the computers
- Knights – Chess board program
- Kolf – a Golf game
- Kollision – a game of dexterity
- GNUlactic Konquest – Galactic strategy game
- KPatience – Patience Card Game
- KReversi – Othello/Reversi game
- KShisen - Shisen-Sho game
- KsirK
- KSpaceDuel
- KSquares
- KSudoku
- KTron
- KTuberling
- Kubrick
- LSkat
- Palapeli

==== Toys ====
- AMOR – Amusing Misuse Of Resources. Desktop creature
- KTeaTime – Tea cooking timer
- KTux
- KWeather

=== Graphics ===
- DigiKam – a cross-platform image organizer
- Gwenview – an image viewer
- KColorChooser – a color chooser
- KColorEdit – a color palette editor
- KFax – a faxing application
- KGrab – a screen grabbing program
- KGraphViewer – a Graphviz dot graph viewer
- KIconEdit – an icon editor
- KolourPaint – Small bitmap graphics editor (similar to Microsoft Paint)
- Konstruktor – LEGO CAD
- KPhotoAlbum – a digital photo and image manager
- KPovModeler – Modeling and composition program for creating POV-Ray scenes
- Krita – Digital painting and illustration suite
- KRuler – a screen ruler
- Spectacle – a screenshot tool
- Kuickshow – an image viewer
- Okular – a universal document viewer
- Skanlite – an image scanning application

=== Internet ===
- Kontact provides personal information management, backed by the Akonadi framework (including KMail, Akregator, etc.)
- Aki – an IRC client
- ChoqoK – a microblogging application
- KGet – a download manager
- KNetworkManager – a GUI for NetworkManager and supports both wired and wireless devices
- Konqueror – a File manager and web browser
- Konversation – a dedicated IRC client
- Kopete – Instant messaging
- KRDC – a remote desktop client
- KTorrent – a BitTorrent client
- KVIrc – a graphical IRC client
- KVpnc – a GUI for various virtual private network (VPN) clients
- Quassel IRC
- Rekonq – a lean web browser based on Webkit
- Smb4k – an SMB/CIFS share browser
- Falkon – a web browser using QtWebEngine, previously known as QupZilla
- Trojitá – a cross-platform email client

=== Multimedia ===
==== Playback ====
- Amarok – Audio player and music manager, includes support for web music services
- Audex – an easy-to-use audio CD ripping application
- Bangarang – a media player
- Dragon Player – a simple and usability–focused multimedia player (formerly known as Codeine)
- JuK – Jukebox and music manager
- Kaffeine – Multimedia player
- KMPlayer – Video player plugin for Konqueror
- KPlayer – Multimedia player and library
- KRadio – an internet and AM/FM radio application
- Elisa – Music player with simple, flexible interface

==== Production ====
- K3b – CD and DVD burning application
- k3bISO – ISO manager
- Kamoso – an application to take pictures and videos from webcam
- Kdenlive – Video editor
- Kid3 – an MP3, Ogg/Vorbis and FLAC tag editor
- KMediaFactory – a template based DVD authoring tool
- KMix – Sound Mixer
- KoverArtist – a program for the fast creation of covers for CD/DVD cases and boxes.
- Kubeplayer – a video player dedicated to play online videos.
- soundKonverter – a frontend to various audio converters

=== Office ===
- Kontact provides personal information management, backed by the Akonadi framework (including Akregator, KNode, KMail, etc.)
- The Calligra Suite provides an office suite, including
  - Calligra Flow – a flowchart and diagram editor
  - Calligra Plan – a project management tool
  - Calligra Sheets – Spreadsheet
  - Calligra Stage – Presentation application
  - Calligra Words – Word processor
- Kexi – a visual database creator
- KEuroCalc – a currency converter and calculator
- Kile – integrated LaTeX environment
- KMyMoney – a personal finance manager
- TaskJuggler – a project management tool
- Skrooge – Personal finances manager
- LabPlot – a data plotting and analysis tool
- LemonPOS – a point of sales application for small and mid–size business
- Tellico – a collection organizer

=== System ===
- Apper, formerly called KPackageKit – Package Manager with support for several formats (e.g. .deb, rpm)
- Dolphin – a navigational file manager
- Filelight – a disk space viewer
- katimon – an unofficial ATI graphics card temperature monitor
- KBluetooth – Bluetooth connections
- KCron – an application for scheduling programs to run in the background using cron
- KDE Connect – A multi-platform utility which allows a mobile device to wirelessly interact with the PC through the local network with interactions such as file sharing and turning your phone into a virtual keyboard or touchpad.
- KDE Partition Manager – a partition editor
- KDE System Guard – an enhanced task manager and system monitor
- KDiskFree – a disk space information utility
- KInfoCenter – a system and computer information utility
- Konsole – a terminal emulator
- Krfb – a desktop sharing program
- Krusader – an orthodox file manager
- KSystemLog – a system log viewer
- KWallet – a secure password manager
- Printer Applet – system tray icon for managing print jobs
- System Settings
- Yakuake – drop-down terminal emulator (modeled after the console screen in Quake)

=== Utilities ===
- Ark – a file archiver
- KAlarm – a personal alarm scheduler
- Kate – a Text editor for programmers
- KBarcode4–light – a simple barcode generator
- KCalc – a calculation application
- KCharSelect – a character mapping tool
- KFind – a file and folder finder
- KFloppy – a floppy disk formatting tool
- KGPG – a graphical frontend for GnuPG
- Kleopatra – Certificate Manager and Unified Crypto GUI
- KRename – Batch renaming of files
- Krusader – a twin panel file manager
- KTimer – a countdown launcher
- KTimeTracker – a personal time tracker
- KWrite – a text editor
- Okteta – a hex editor
- RSIBreak – Makes sure you rest now and then
- Sweeper – a system cleaner

==== Accessibility ====
- KMag – a screen magnifying tool
- KMouseTool – Automatic Mouse Click
- KMouth – a speech synthesizer frontend

=== Discontinued ===
Unmaintained Applications

- Blogilo – a blogging client
- kdetv – TV viewer
- Jovie – text to audible speech
- KAppfinder – a menu updating tool
- Karbon – a scalable graphics application
- Katapult – a free application launcher
- KAudioCreator – CD ripping and encoding
- KDM – a login manager
- KEdit – a text editor, has been replaced by Kate &/or Kwrite
- KDirStat – a graphical disk usage utility (superseded by QDirStat or K4DirStat)
- KEduca – an educational software
- KFileReplace – a file search and replace tool
- KFTPGrabber – a graphical FTP client
- KBFX – an application launcher
- Kiosk Admin Tool – predefine desktop configurations
- KLinkStatus – a link checker
- KMess – an IM client
- KMid – MIDI and karaoke file (*.kar) player
- KMLDonkey – a graphical frontend for MLDonkey
- KNC – a graphical orthodox file manager
- KNemo – a network monitor
- KNode – usenet newsgroups
- KOffice – an office suite that was superseded by Calligra Suite
- Komposé – a fullscreen task switcher
- KPager – desktop pager
- KPDF – a PDF viewer
- KPPP – an Internet dial–up tool
- Kraft – a document creator for small businesses
- KRecipes – a cook book
- KRemoteControl – remote Controls
- KSame – color matching game
- KSaoLaJi – a system cleaner
- KsCD – CD Player
- KSig – signature app
- KSnapshot – a screenshot tool
- Kst – real-time large-dataset viewing and plotting tool
- KUIViewer – Qt Designer UI File Viewer
- KUser – a user managing tool
- Kwlan – a wireless LAN manager
- KXDocker – an application launcher
- Mailody – an e–mail client
- QtParted – Partition editor
- Quanta Plus – IDE for XML–based languages
- RecordItNow – Record desktop
- Simon – Speech Recognition
- SuperKaramba – desktop applets program

== Releases ==
The KDE Applications Bundle is released every four months and has bugfix releases in each intervening month. A date-based version scheme is used, which is composed of the year and month. A third digit is used for bugfix releases.

With the April 2021 release, the KDE Applications Bundle has been renamed to KDE Gear.

KDE Applications Bundle release history
| Version | Key feature | Date |
|---|---|---|
| 14.12 | Kate, Konsole, Gwenview, KAlgebra, Kanagram, KHangman, Kig, Parley, KApptemplate and Okteta ported to KDE Frameworks 5. | 17 Dec 2014 |
| 15.04 | Rocs, Cantor, Kompare, Kdenlive and KDE Telepathy ported to KDE Frameworks 5. | 15 Apr 2015 |
| 15.08 | Dolphin and Ark ported to KDE Frameworks 5. Technology preview of KF5-based Kontact suite. | 19 Aug 2015 |
| 15.12 | KSnapshot was replaced by Spectacle, KTuberling, Klickety and KNavalBattle have also been updated to use KDE Frameworks 5. | 16 Dec 2015 |
| 16.04 | New music education software (Minuet), KHelpCenter now part of KDE Applications, bugfixes to Kontact, Ark | 20 Apr 2016 |
| 16.08 | Kolourpaint, Cervisia, KDiskFree, The Kontact Suite, Marble | 18 Aug 2016 |
| 16.12 | Kwave; Okular, Konqueror, KGpg, KTouch and Kalzium ported to KDE Frameworks 5. | 15 Dec 2016 |
| 17.04 | | 20 Apr 2017 |
| 17.08 | | 17 Aug 2017 |
| 17.12 | | 14 Dec 2017 |
| 18.04 | | 19 Apr 2018 |
| 18.08 | | 16 Aug 2018 |
| 18.12 | | 13 Dec 2018 |
| 19.04 | | 18 Apr 2019 |
| 19.08 | | 15 Aug 2019 |
| 19.12 | | 12 Dec 2019 |
| 20.04 | | 23 Apr 2020 |
| 20.08 | | 13 Aug 2020 |
| 20.12 | | 10 Dec 2020 |
| 21.04 | | 22 Apr 2021 |
| 21.08 | | 12 Aug 2021 |
| 21.12 | | 9 Dec 2021 |
| 22.04 | | 21 Apr 2022 |
| 22.08 | | 18 Aug 2022 |
| 22.12 | | 8 Dec 2022 |
| 23.04 | | 20 Apr 2023 |
| 23.08 | | 24 Aug 2023 |
| 24.02 | many applications ported to Qt 6. | 28 Feb 2024 |
| 24.05 | | 23 May 2024 |
| 24.08 | | 22 Aug 2024 |
| 24.12 | | 12 Dec 2024 |
| 25.04 | | 17 Apr 2025 |
| 25.08 | | 14 Aug 2025 |
| 25.12 | | 11 Dec 2025 |
| 26.04 | | 16 Apr 2026 |
Unsupported Latest version Preview version Future version

== See also ==
- List of GNOME applications
