= KDE Education Project =

Project to development free educational software

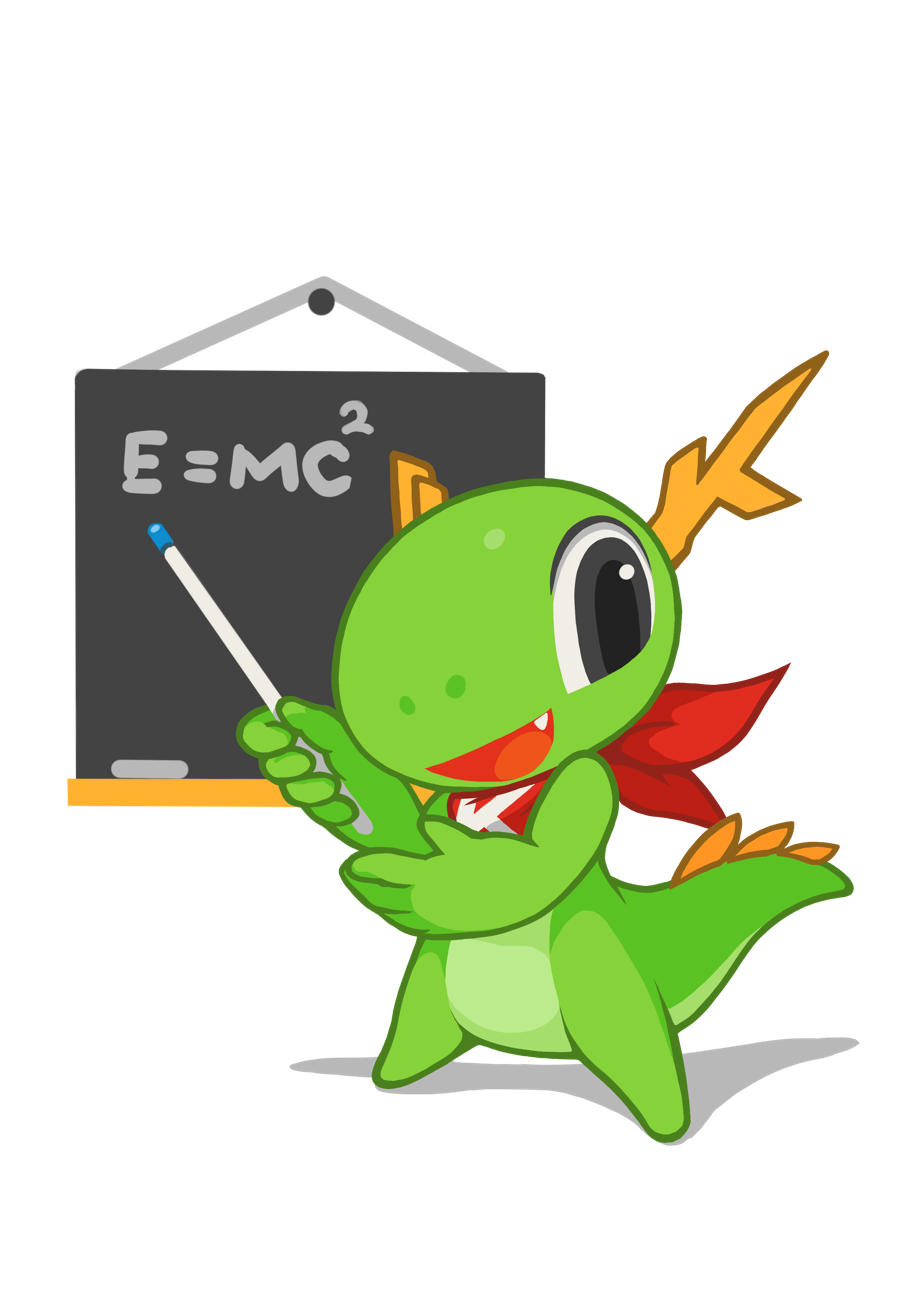
- Founded: July 2001; 25 years ago
- Founder: Eva Brucherseifer and other
- Purpose: Free educational software
- Products: kdeedu module
- Website: edu.kde.org

The KDE Education Project (or KDE-Edu project) develops free educational software based on the KDE technologies for students and parents. These educational software is translated into more than 65 languages, so that users can access them without any problems. The KDE-Edu project also provides free software educational to support and facilitate teachers in planning lessons.

The KDE-Edu project is available for BSD and Linux; Microsoft Windows support is in beta.

== History ==
The KDE-Edu project was started in July 2001. The goal of the project is to develop Free Educational Software (GNU General Public License) within the KDE environment. This software is mainly aimed to schools, to students and to parents at home as well as to adults willing to extend their knowledge.

== List of software ==
This software is bundled in the kdeedu package. All applications are fully KDE compatible.

=== Languages ===
- Kanagram - Customizable game based upon anagrams of words.
- KHangMan - Classic hangman game.
- Kiten - Japanese reference/learning tool with English to Japanese and Japanese to English dictionary and kanji dictionary.
- KLettres - Helps to learn the alphabet and then to read some syllables in different languages.
- KWordQuiz - Helps to learn vocabulary using a "flash card" or multiple choice, or quiz types
- Parley - Vocabulary trainer using a spaced repetition or "flash card" approach.

=== Mathematics ===
- Cantor - Front-end to powerful mathematics and statistics packages. Integrated four environments, (SageMath, Maxima, R, KAlgebra) into the KDE Platform and provides a nice, worksheet-based, graphical user interface.
- KAlgebra - A mathematical calculator that lets you plot different types of 2D and 3D functions and perform based upon content markup MathML language.
- KBruch - Small program to practice calculations with fractions and percentages.
- Kig - Program for interactively exploring geometric constructions.
- KmPlot - Mathematical function plotter drawing draw graphs, their integrals or derivatives.

=== Miscellaneous ===
- Blinken - Computerized version of the game, Simon Says which challenges players to remember increasingly long sequences of four colored buttons.
- KGeography - A geography learning program, with political divisions of some countries (divisions, capitals of those divisions and their associated flags if there are some).
- KTouch - Program for learning touch typing.
- KTurtle - Educational programming environment like Logo using turtle graphics and the TurtleScript programming language.
- Pairs - A computerized version of the game Concentration that will help train your memory by remembering different images, shapes, sounds and text.

=== Science ===
- Kalzium - Visual representation of the periodic table of elements and includes basic information about all common elements.
- KStars - Desktop planetarium program for KDE providing an accurate graphical simulation of the night sky, from any location on Earth, at any date and time.
- Marble - Virtual globe and world atlas that you can use to learn more about the Earth.
- Step - An interactive physics simulator, allowing you to explore the physical world through simulations.
- Rocs - Graph Theory IDE for designing and analyzing graphs and algorithms with an easy-to-use visual data structure editor and a powerful scripting engine to execute algorithms.

== Software unfinished ==
- Artikulate - A language learning software that helps improving pronunciation skills.

== Discontinued ==
- eqchem - For balancing chemical equations.
- Kard - A pair-matching children's memory game.
- KMathTool - A collection of mathematical calculators, like a factor finder.
- Kalcul - A mathematics testing program.
- KPercentage - Small math application that will help pupils to improve their skills in calculating percentages.
- KSimus - Digital circuit simulator program.
- KEduca - Educational project to enable the creation and revision of form-based tests and exams.

== See also ==
- KCalc — software calculator developed by KDE Projects
- List of free educational software
