= KRDC =

KRDC may refer to:

- KWVE (AM), a radio station (1110 AM) licensed to serve Pasadena, California, United States, which held the call sign KRDC from 2017 to 2023
- KRDC (KDE), a remote desktop client
