= Computer lab =

Facility for public access to desktop computers or laptops

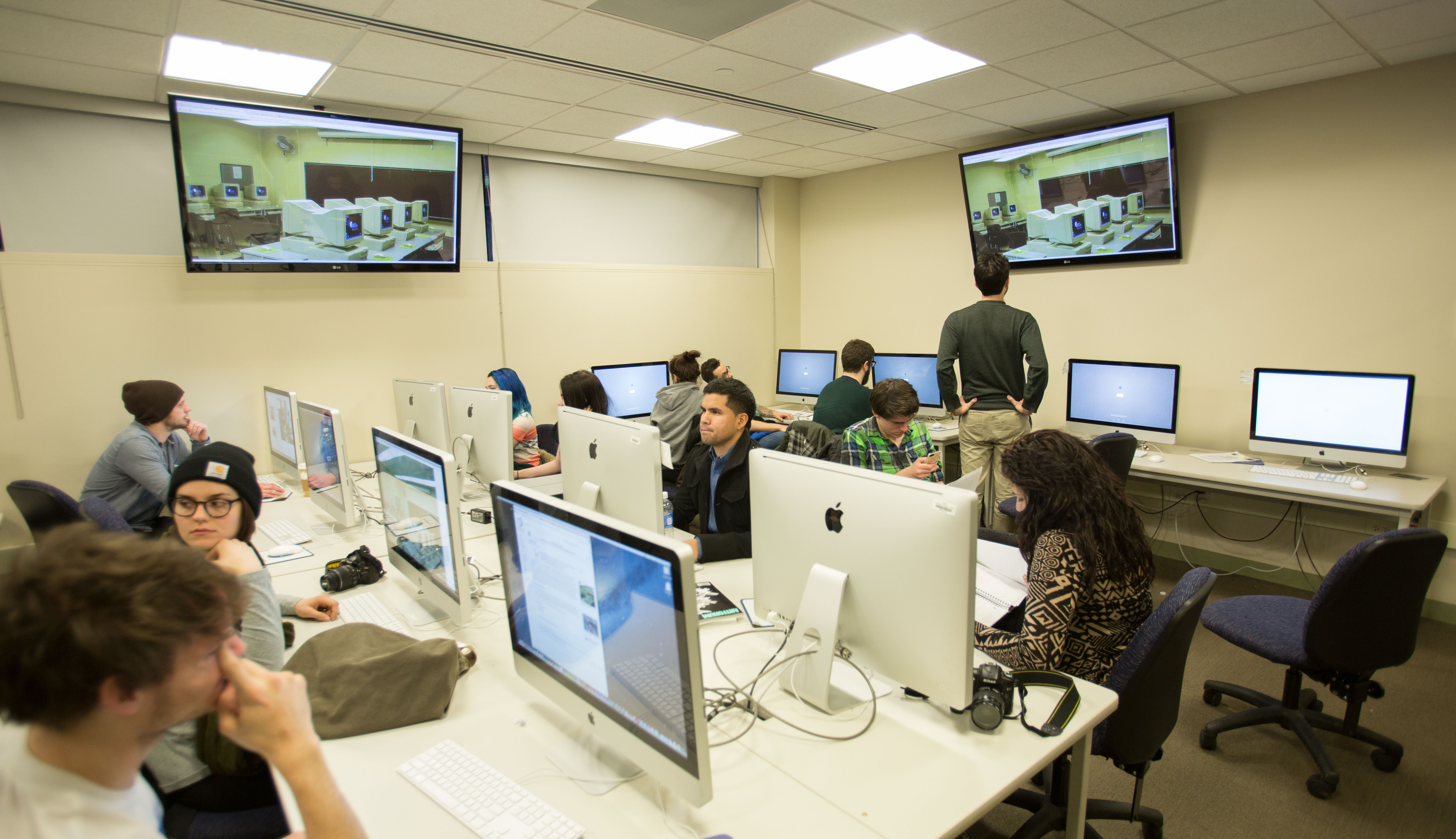
Computer lab on SUNY Purchase campus

A computer lab is a space where computer services are provided to a defined community. These are typically public libraries and academic institutions. Generally, users must follow a certain user policy to retain access to the computers. This usually consists of rules such as no illegal activity during use or attempts to circumvent any security or content-control software while using the computers.

Computer labs are often subject to time limits in order to allow more people access to use the lab. It is also common for personal login credentials to be required for access. This allows institutions to track user activities for any possible fraudulent use. The computers in computer labs are typically equipped with internet access, scanners, and printers and are typically arranged in rows. This is to give the workstation a similar view to facilitate lecturing or presentations, and also to facilitate small group work.

For some academic institutions, student laptops or laptop carts take the place of dedicated computer labs. However, computer labs still have a place in applications requiring special software or hardware which are not easily accessible in personal computers.

== Purposes ==
Computer lab

While computer labs are generally multipurpose, some labs may contain computers with hardware or software optimized for certain tasks or processes, depending on the needs of the institution operating the lab. These specialized purposes may include video editing, computational research, 3-D computer-aided design, programming, and GIS. Increasingly, these have become the main purposes for the existence of traditional desktop-style computer labs, due to rising ownership of inexpensive personal computers making use of the lab only necessary when the expensive, specialized software and more powerful computers needed to run it are required.

=== In educational institutions ===
Computer laboratories especially in educational institutions have undergone major transformations since their early development in the late 20th century. Computer labs used to be equipment-centered environments used primarily for teaching programming basics or computer literacy. Access to these facilities was often limited, as personal computers were rare and costly at the time. According to EDUCAUSE Review, early computer labs emphasized individual technical proficiency and structured, task-based learning rather than collaborative or creative engagement.

In the 21st century, computer labs at schools and universities have transformed into flexible, student-focused spaces that encourage collaboration, experimentation, and even remote learning. Modern labs often include mobile devices, wireless networks, and cloud-based systems, making it easier for students and teachers to share resources and learn beyond the walls of the lab. Cloud platforms like AWS EC2 take this a step further, giving schools the ability to scale resources as needed and provide students and instructors with access from anywhere.

=== COVID-19 effects ===
During the COVID-19 pandemic, the usage of computer labs reduced since physical class attendance had stopped. In return, many institutions implemented virtual computer labs and remote access to resources for students to access from home.

When campuses reopened, virtual labs continued to provide flexible access to software, and high-performance computing resources, and physical labs remained for collaborative work or resource intensive tasks. Even though they were effective, surveys show that instructors faced a challenge on maintaining engagement in these virtual labs and group work quality for hands-on experiences.

Many of these challenges were linked to unequal access to technology. Some students had difficulty using virtual labs because of unstable internet connections or limited access to suitable devices. As a result, institutions continued investing in hybrid systems that combine on-campus resources with remote access options.

== Arrangements ==
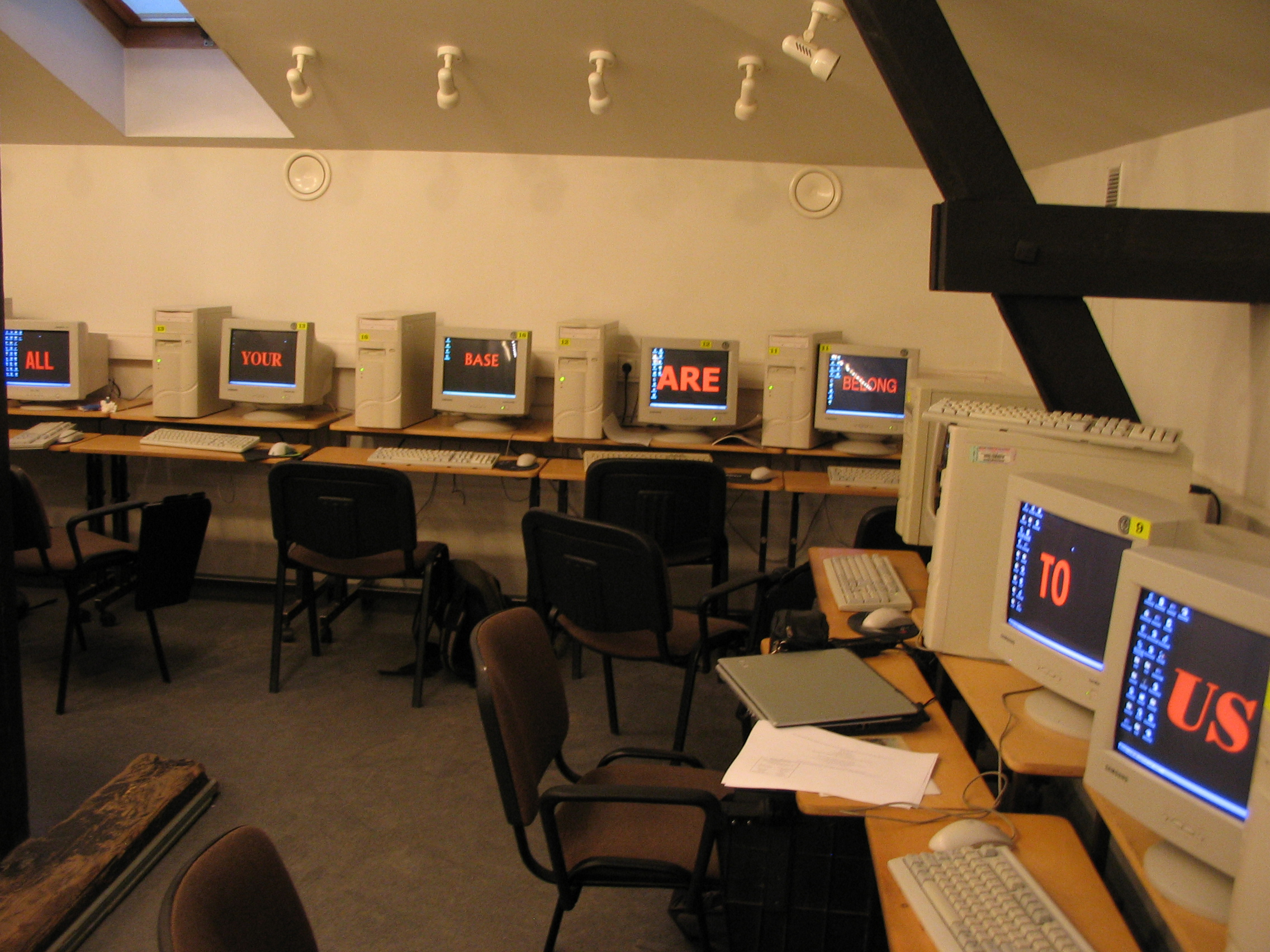
Around a room

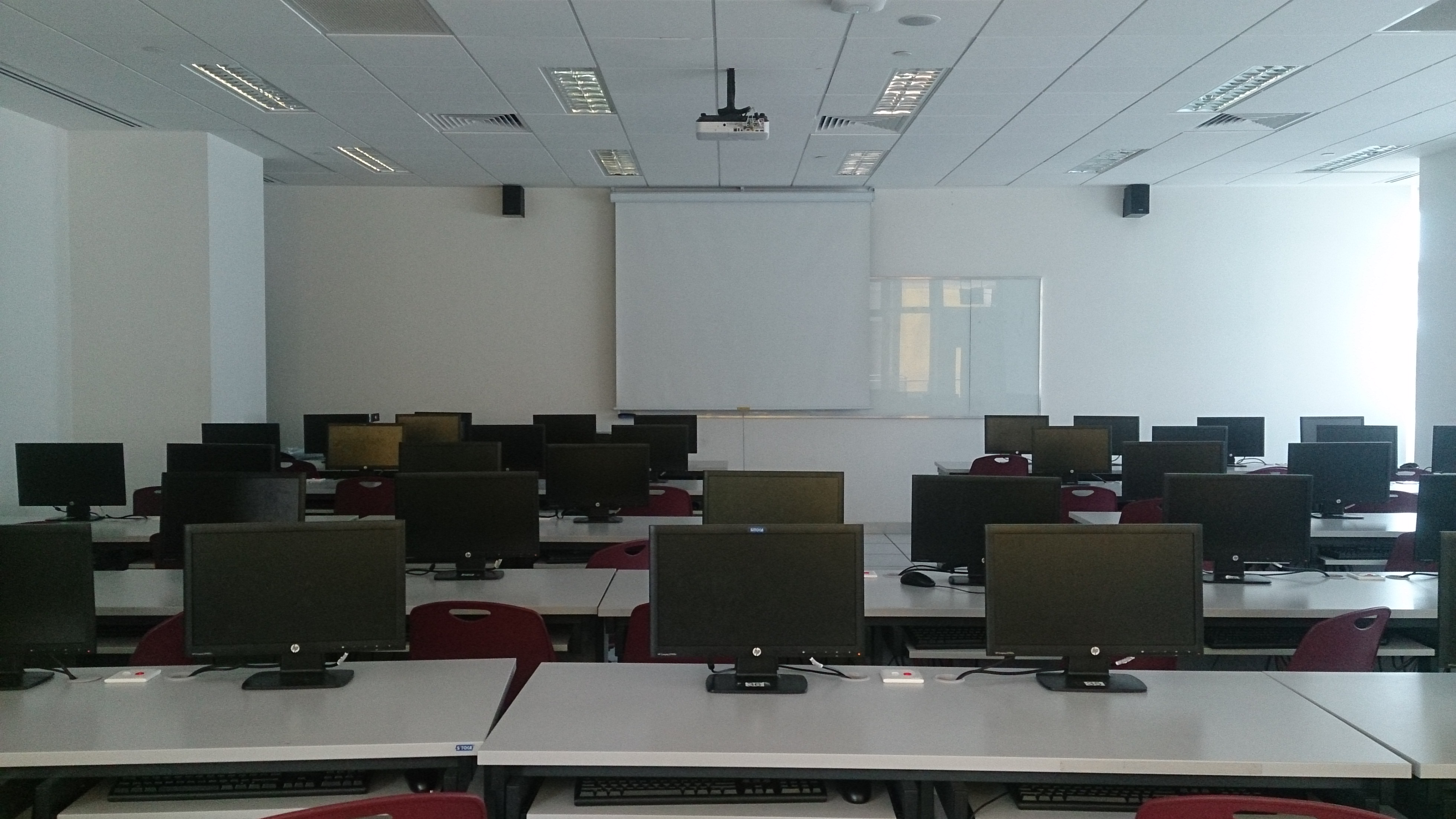
Arranged in rows

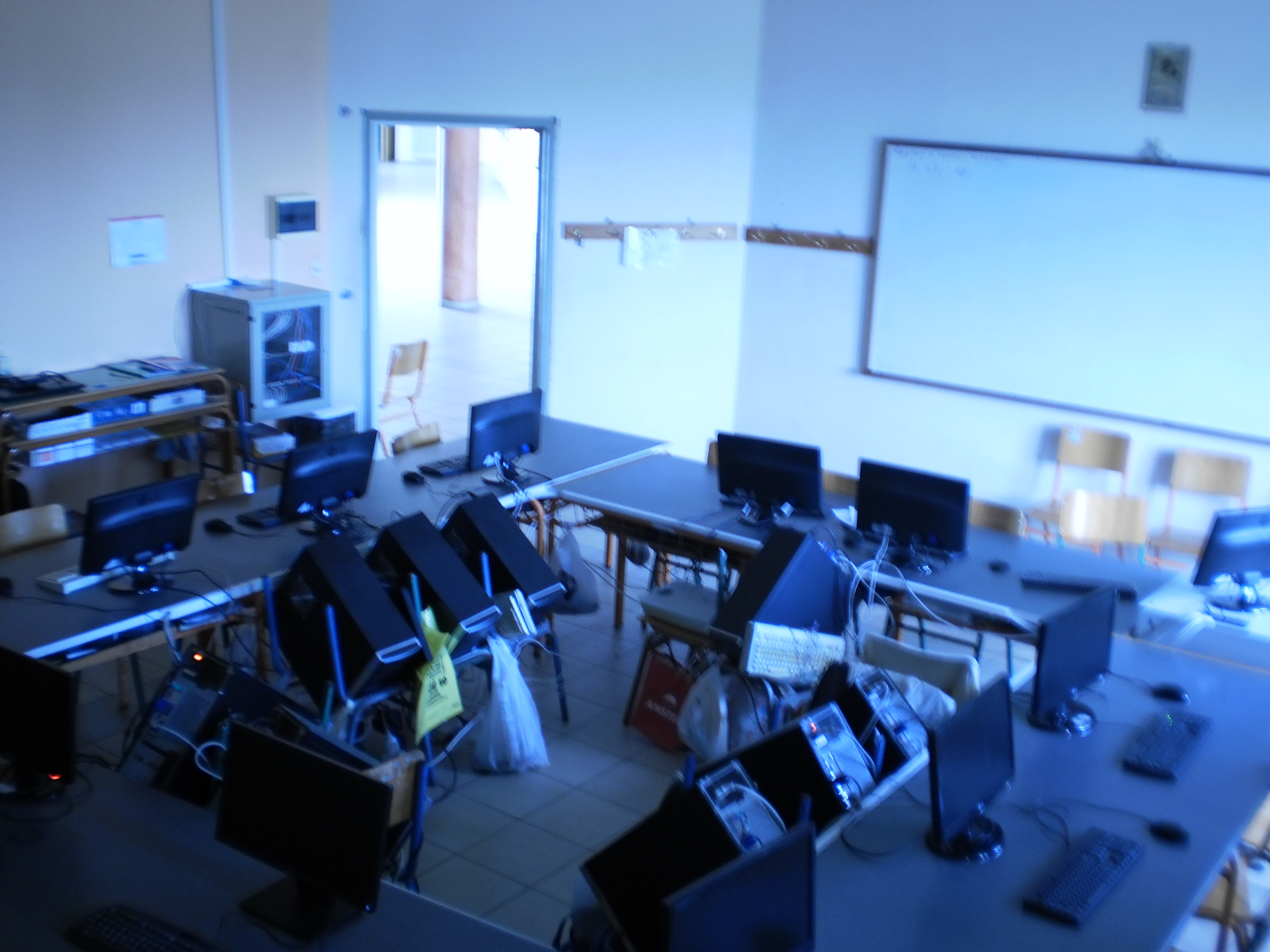
Arranged in a ring

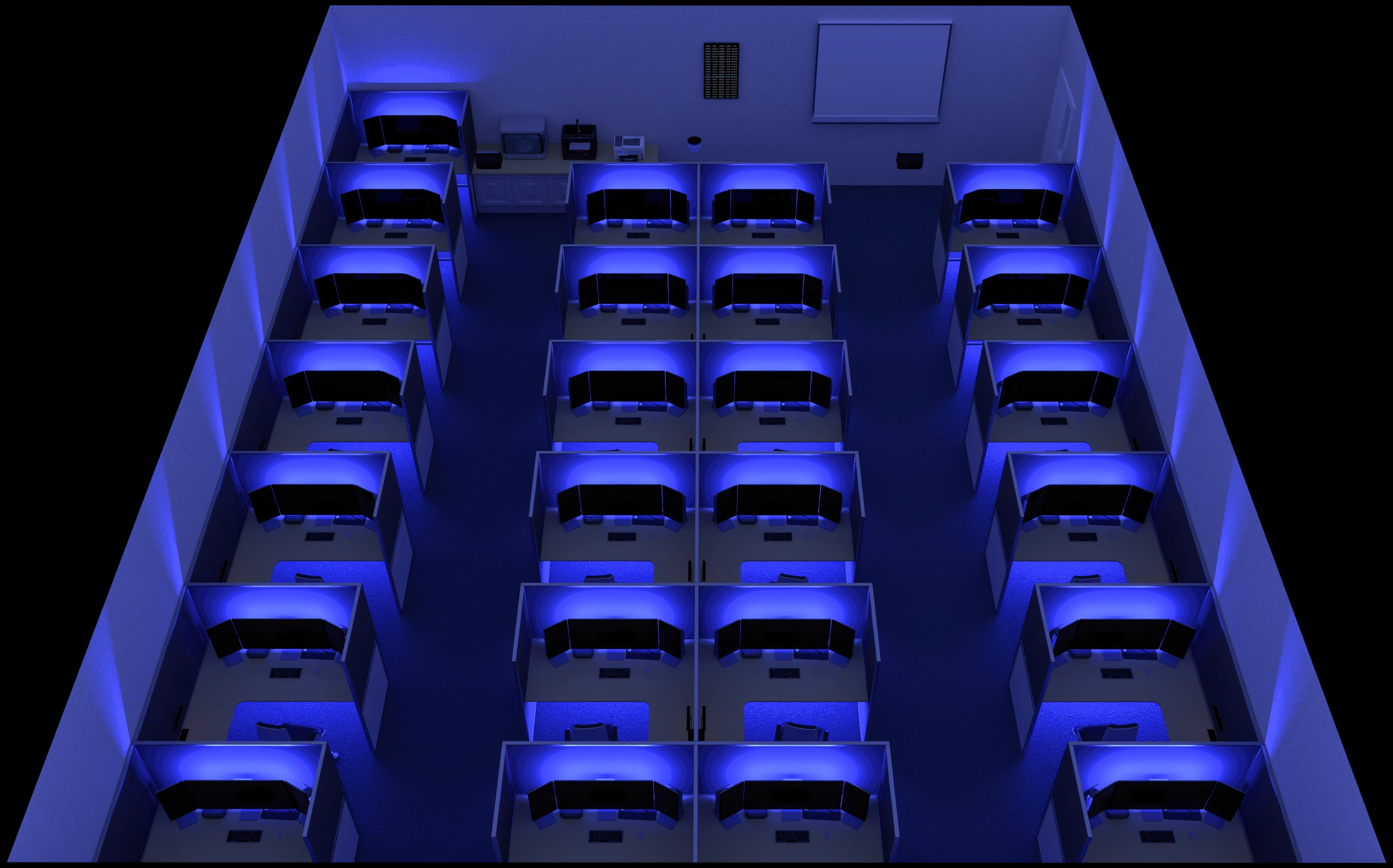
Arranged in cubicles

== Alternatives ==
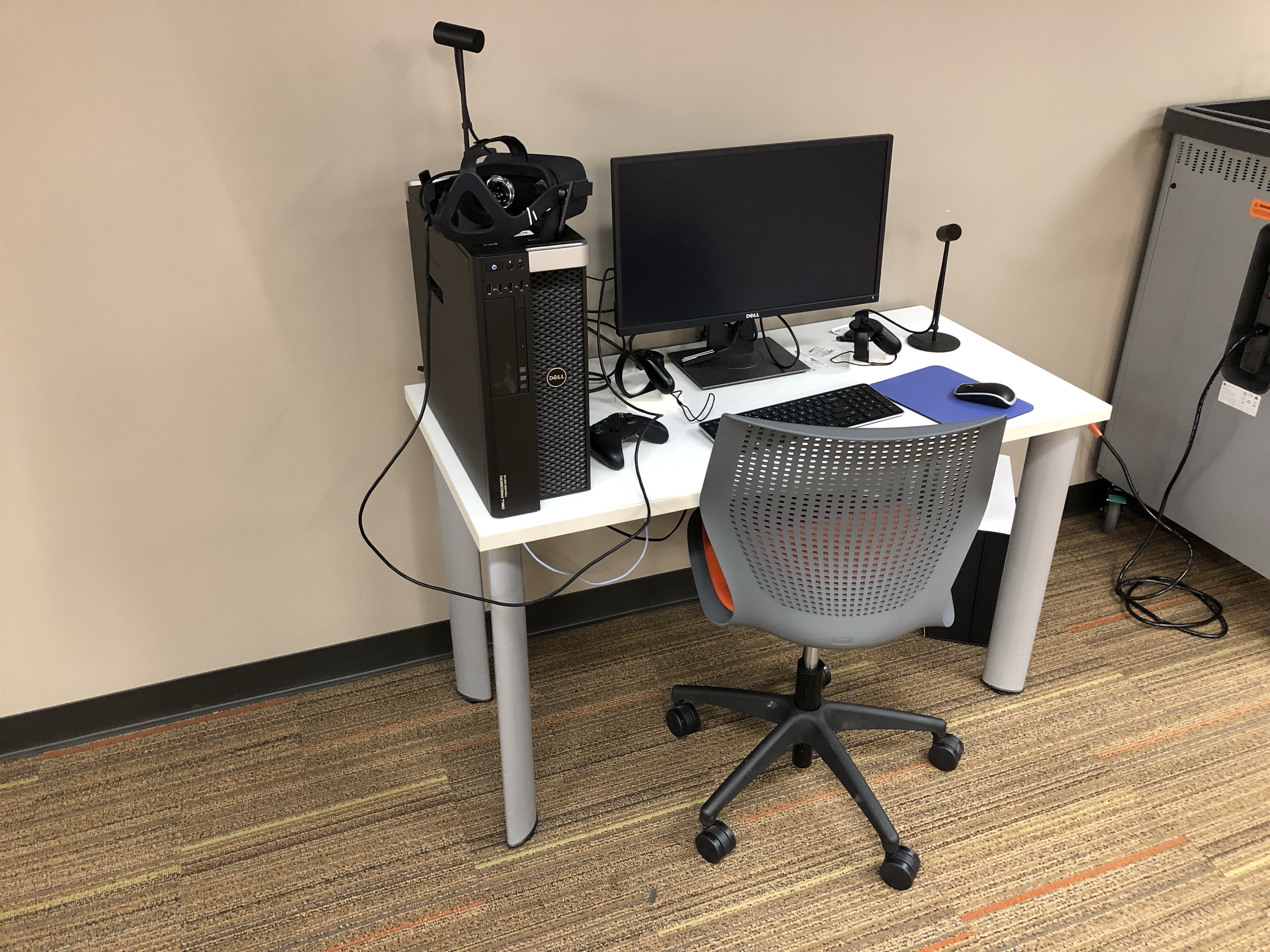
Some labs use both desktops and laptops. This lab uses desktops for specific uses, such as the Virtual Reality Workstation, and laptops for general computing.

In some settings, traditional desktop computer labs are impractical due to the requirement of a dedicated space. Because of this, some labs use laptop carts instead of desktop setups, in order to both save space and give the lab some degree of mobility. In the context of academic institutions, some traditional desktop computer labs are being phased out in favor of other solutions judged to be more efficient given that most students own personal laptops. One of these solutions is a virtual lab, which can allow users to install software from the lab server onto their own laptops or log into virtual machines remotely, essentially turning their own laptops into lab machines.

=== Gender representation ===
A longitudinal study conducted at a U.S. university in the early 2000s found that women reported less frequent use of campus computer labs than men. More recent studies indicate that the gender gap in basic access and frequency of computer use has narrowed in many educational contexts, and research from the 2010s-2020s reports comparable or increased lab engagement by female students. However, lower reported confidence with technology, persist in some contexts, and participation still varies by country, age group and subfield of computing.

== Academic software bundles ==
Many universities purchase and maintain discounted academic software bundles and software suites, or free open-source software for their computer labs, such as programming text editors, programming languages, CAx software, rendering engines, Adobe Creative Cloud, Microsoft Office Suite, productivity software, statistical software, music software, video editing software, 3D animation software, and photo editing software.

== Similar spaces ==
=== Media lab ===
A media lab (often referred to as "new media lab" or "media research lab") is a term used for interdisciplinary organizations, collectives or spaces with the main focus on new media, digital culture and technology. The MIT Media Lab is a well-known example of a media lab.

=== Internet café ===
An Internet café is essentially a public-facing computer lab that anyone can use but which charge a fee (often hourly) to use their computers. The term 'Internet café' may be used interchangeably with 'computer lab' but may differ from a computer lab in that users can also connect to the Internet using their own device, and users of a computer lab generally do not need any equipment of their own. Moreover, in typical parlance, a computer lab is a location within a larger organization (such as a university), while an Internet café is a standalone business.

== See also ==
- Computer science
- Computers in the classroom
- Cubicle
- School library
- Kiosk software
- Printer and photocopier
- Public computer
- LAN gaming center
- List of educational software
- List of free educational software
- List of online educational resources
- Fab lab
