= LinuxEDU =

- Developer: Marian Banica
- OS family: Linux (Unix-like)
- Working state: Current
- Source model: Open source
- Initial release: 11 November 2015
- Latest release: 1.1 Aurel Vlaicu / November 11, 2015,
- Marketing target: Scientific purpose / High Performance Computing / Servers / Desktops
- Update method: Yum (PackageKit)
- Package manager: Deb (file format)
- Supported platforms: x86, x86-64
- Kernel type: Monolithic (Linux)
- Default user interface: LXDE
- License: EUPL & Various others.
- Official website: www.sourceforge.net/project/educatie/

LinuxEDU is a Linux distribution based on Ubuntu (operating system). It is a free and open-source operating system that helps students and teachers to be able to provide better higher education all over the world.

== Features ==
Included with LinuxEDU is the Linux Terminal Server Project, a large number of educational applications including Kiwix, an open-source wiki offline reader, KDE Edutainment Suite, LibreOffice, GNOME Nanny and iTalc as well as many more.

== See also ==
- Ubuntu (operating system)
