= SchoolTool =

Student information system

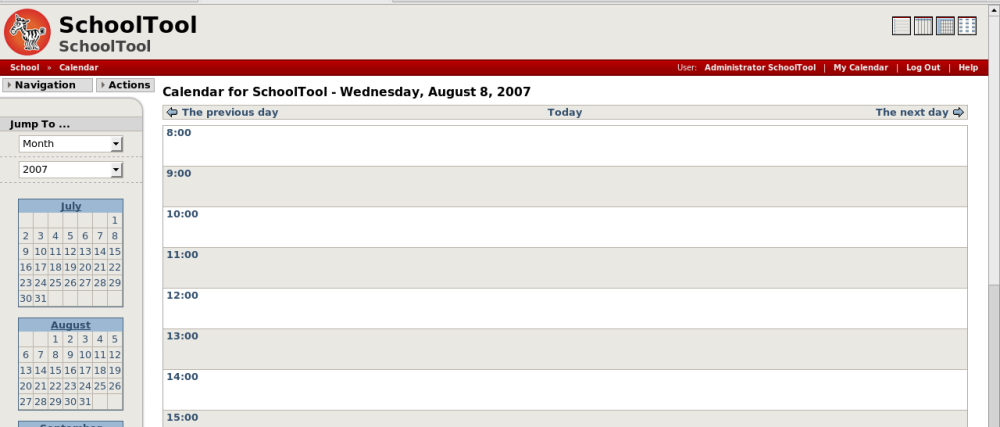
- Developer: The Shuttleworth Foundation
- Initial release: 2004; 21 years ago
- Stable release: 2.8.4 / July 4, 2015; 10 years ago
- Written in: Zope (Python)
- Operating system: Ubuntu
- Type: SIS
- License: GNU GPL v2

SchoolTool is a GPL licensed, free student information system for schools around the world. The goals of the project are to create a student information system, including demographics, gradebook, attendance, calendaring and reporting for primary and secondary schools, as well as a framework for building customized applications and configurations for individual schools or states.

SchoolTool is built as a free software/open source software stack, licensed under the GNU General Public License, Version 2, written in Python using the Zope 3 framework.

The sub-projects of SchoolTool are as follows:

- The SchoolTool Calendar and SchoolBell are calendar and resource management tools for schools available as part of the Edubuntu Linux distribution.
- A SchoolTool student information system is being developed and tested in collaboration with schools
- CanDo is a SchoolTool-based skills tracking program developed by Virginia students and teachers to track which skills students are acquiring in their classes and at what level of competency.

SchoolTool is configured by default to act as what is often called a student information system or SIS. The focus is on tracking information related to students: demographics, enrollment grades, attendance, reporting. It is a subset of a complete "management information system" (MIS) for schools, which might also cover systems like accounting.

SchoolTool is not a learning management system, or LMS, such as Moodle, although they share some overlapping feature sets, such as a gradebook. SchoolTool does not contain curriculum or learning objects.

A post on the product news page in October 2016 titled "The Future of SIELibre and SchoolTool" indicates that the primary SchoolTool developers have moved on to other things. This was accompanied by a google document explaining the decision and thanking contributors for their efforts.

== SchoolTool Features ==
- Customizable demographics;
- Student contact management;
- Calendars for the school, groups, and individuals;
- Resource booking;
- Teacher gradebooks;
- Class attendance;
- Report card generation.

== See also ==
- OpenEMIS
- Enterprise Application Integration
- Open Knowledge Initiative
- Web services
- FET
