= Computational mathematics =

Area of mathematics

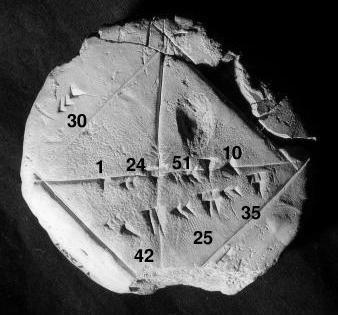
A black and white rendition of the Yale Babylonian Collection's Tablet YBC 7289 (c. 1800–1600 BCE), showing a Babylonian approximation to the square root of 2 (1 24 51 10 w: sexagesimal) in the context of Pythagoras' Theorem for an isosceles triangle. The tablet also gives an example where one side of the square is 30, and the resulting diagonal is 42 25 35 or 42.4263888.

Computational mathematics is a field of study that focuses on the interaction of mathematical sciences, computer science, and algorithms.

A large part of computational mathematics consists roughly of using mathematics for allowing and improving computer computation in areas of science and engineering where mathematics are useful. This involves in particular algorithm design, computational complexity, numerical methods and computer algebra.

Computational mathematics refers also to the use of computers for mathematics itself. This includes mathematical experimentation for establishing conjectures (particularly in number theory), the use of computers for proving theorems (for example the four color theorem), and the design and use of proof assistants.

== Areas of computational mathematics ==
Computational mathematics emerged as a distinct part of applied mathematics by the early 1950s. Currently, computational mathematics can refer to or include:

- Computational sciences, also known as scientific computation or computational engineering
- Systems sciences, which directly requires mathematical models from systems engineering
- Solving mathematical problems by computer simulation as opposed to traditional engineering methods.
- Numerical methods used in scientific computation, for example numerical linear algebra and numerical solution of partial differential equations
- Stochastic methods, such as Monte Carlo methods and other representations of uncertainty in scientific computation
- The mathematics of scientific computation, in particular numerical analysis, the theory of numerical methods
- Computational complexity
- Computer algebra and computer algebra systems
- Computer-assisted research in various areas of mathematics, such as logic (automated theorem proving), discrete mathematics, combinatorics, number theory, and computational algebraic topology
- Cryptography and computer security, which involve, in particular, research on primality testing, factorization, elliptic curves, and mathematics of blockchain
- Computational linguistics, the use of mathematical and computer techniques in natural languages
- Computational algebraic geometry
- Computational group theory
- Computational geometry
- Computational number theory
- Computational topology
- Computational statistics
- Algorithmic information theory
- Algorithmic game theory
- Mathematical economics, the use of mathematics in economics, finance and, to certain extents, of accounting.
- Experimental mathematics

== Journals ==
Journals that publish contributions from computational mathematics include

- ACM Transactions on Mathematical Software
- Mathematics of Computation
- SIAM Journal on Scientific Computing
- SIAM Journal on Numerical Analysis

== See also ==
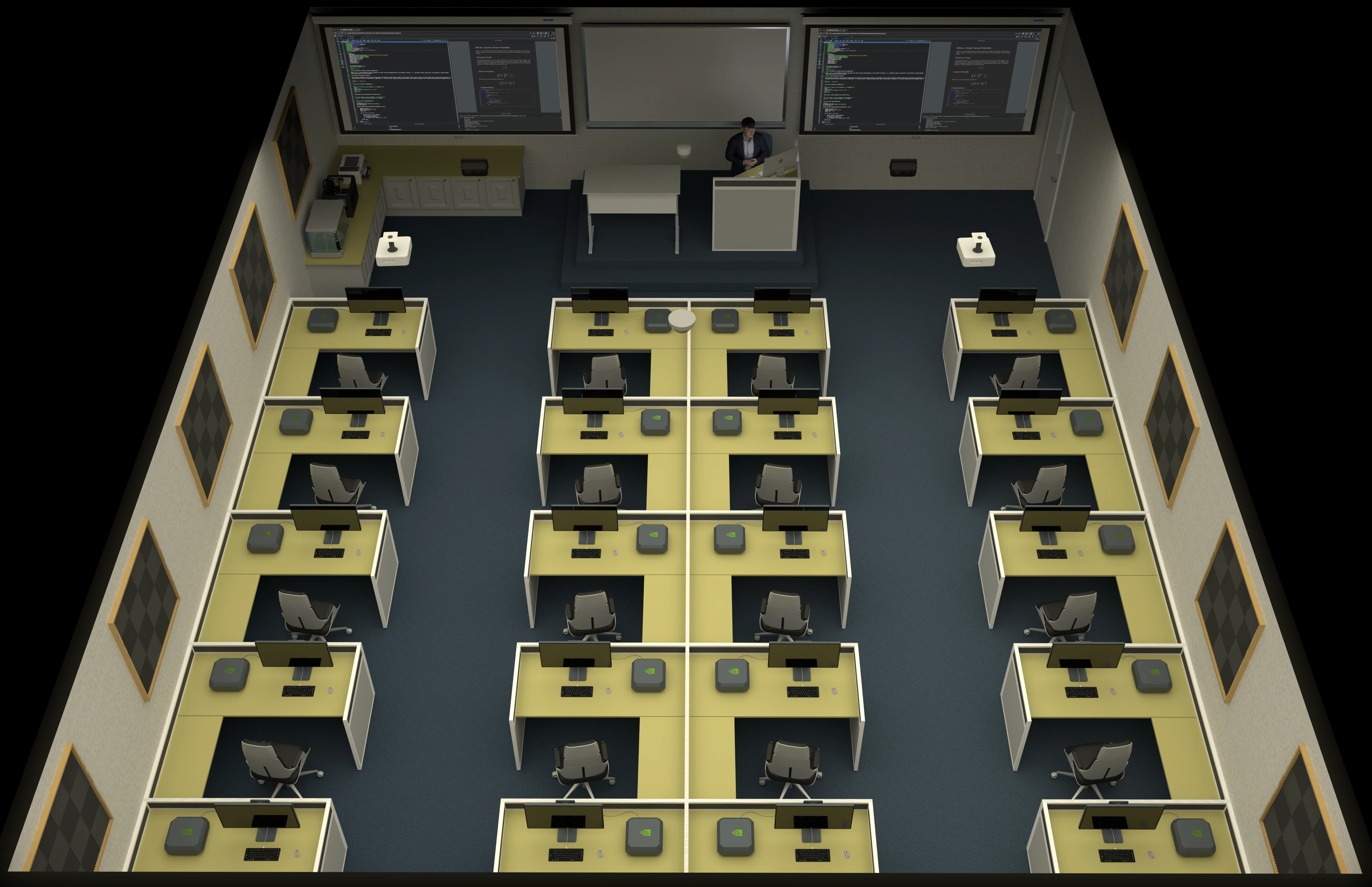
Computational mathematics classroom 3D design

- Computer-based mathematics education
- Mathematical software
- List of free educational software for computational mathematics
- List of open-source software for mathematics
