= Gjiten =

Free software dictionary

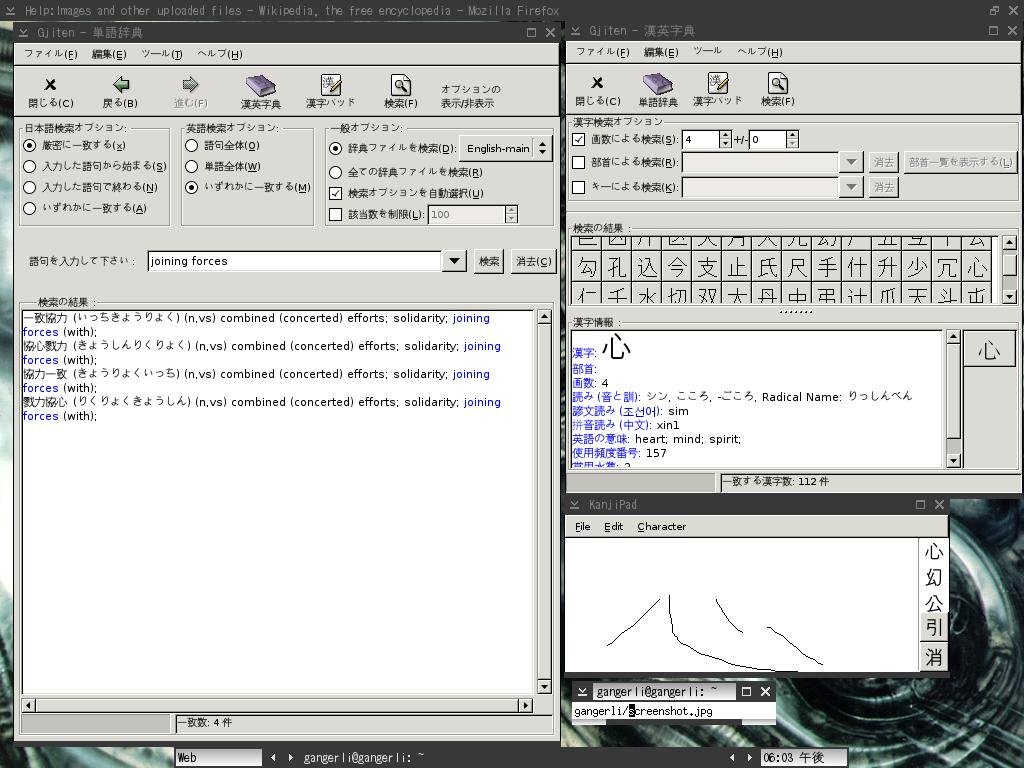
- Gjiten 2.6 with Japanese interface under Blackbox.
- Developer: b0ti
- Stable release: 2.6
- Operating system: Linux
- Available in: English, Japanese
- Type: Dictionary
- License: GPLv2
- Website: https://gjiten.sourceforge.net/

Gjiten (pronounced goo-jee-ten) is a free software dictionary application developed for Linux operating systems, using the GNOME development libraries. It functions primarily as a Japanese–English dictionary tool meant to search EDICT dictionary files, but it has other features such as hand-drawn kanji recognition. It was first published on December 25, 1999. Its current release is v2.6, available since October 28, 2006. The source code is downloadable from the developers' website.

== Function ==
Gjiten has a graphical user interface, with most of the search options and parameters readily shown in the toolbar. The window serves as a frontend for dictionary lookup actions, able to look up words based on hiragana, katakana, kanji or English. It requires the user to define UTF8 dictionary files for use, otherwise it will not work. The EDICT and KanjiDIC dictionaries are installed by default. A further requirement is a Japanese Input method and fontset, like im-ja, kinput2, or anthy.

== Main features ==
- Multiple dictionary search (extensions)
- Extensive kanji information on a single click (Kanjidic)
- Kanji search based on stroke counts, radicals or search keys
- Handwritten kanji recognition (requires Kanjipad installation)
- English and Japanese menus
- All important search parameters
  - Beginning with.../End with... etc.
  - Search result limiter
- Customizable font/font size

== See also ==
- Kiten (program) – similar application for the KDE Desktop environment
- JWPce – free software word-processor/dictionary bundle.
