= WebMathematics Interactive =

WebMathematics Interactive (WMI) is an open source mathematics software. It primarily supports solving problems and exercises in mathematics for ages 14—20.

== Background ==
WMI was developed in the University of Szeged and the Bolyai Institute to help students understand mathematics better. It also supports practicing typical exercises and preparation for exams.

The project was supported by the Ministry of Informatics and Communications, Hungary, in 2003.

== Technical details ==
The WMI program is written in PHP. Many other software are also contained in the underlying software packages, such as LaTeX, Latex2html, Apache, PostgreSQL, and Xeukleides.
