= Mahara (software) =

Free and open-source web-based electronic portfolio management system

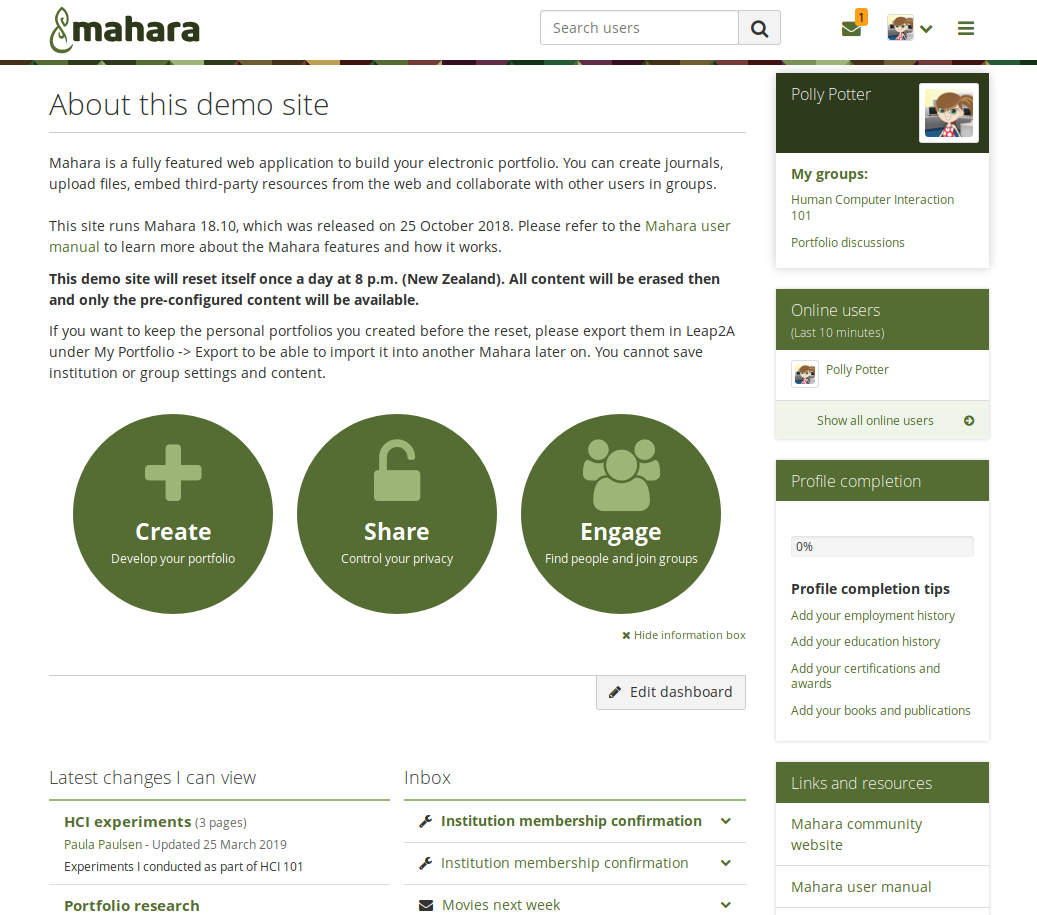
- Screenshot of a Mahara e-portfolio dashboard
- Original authors: Catalyst IT Limited and contributors
- Initial release: 1 April 2008
- Stable release: 20.04.2 / 22 October 2020; 5 years ago
- Written in: PHP
- Type: Electronic portfolio system
- License: GPLv3+
- Website: mahara.org
- Repository: git.mahara.org/mahara/mahara

Mahara is an open-source web-based electronic portfolio (eportfolio) management system written in PHP and distributed under the GNU General Public License. The Māori language word mahara means "to think about or consider".

== History ==
Mahara began in 2006 as a collaboration between Massey University, Auckland University of Technology, the Open Polytechnic of New Zealand and Victoria University of Wellington, funded by the Tertiary Education Commission. Mahara was initially developed by Catalyst IT Limited, a New Zealand open-source software company, and first released in April 2008. Development of Mahara has since expanded to include a community of contributors, including the New Zealand Ministry of Education.

The software was designed to be an open-source electronic portfolio platform to support the student learning and personal learning environment goals of educational institutions. Mahara allows students to select their own work and prepare an online portfolio, to both share in a university classroom context and show to future employers.

Mahara receives constant updates, with the most recent versions being Mahara 25.04.7 and 26.04.1.

== Language support ==
Mahara supports translation into different languages using language packs, and contributions of complete or near-complete coverage have been provided for Japanese, Basque, French, Māori, Slovenian, German, Czech, and Danish languages.
