= Cantor (mathematics software) =

Software for scientific statistics and analysis

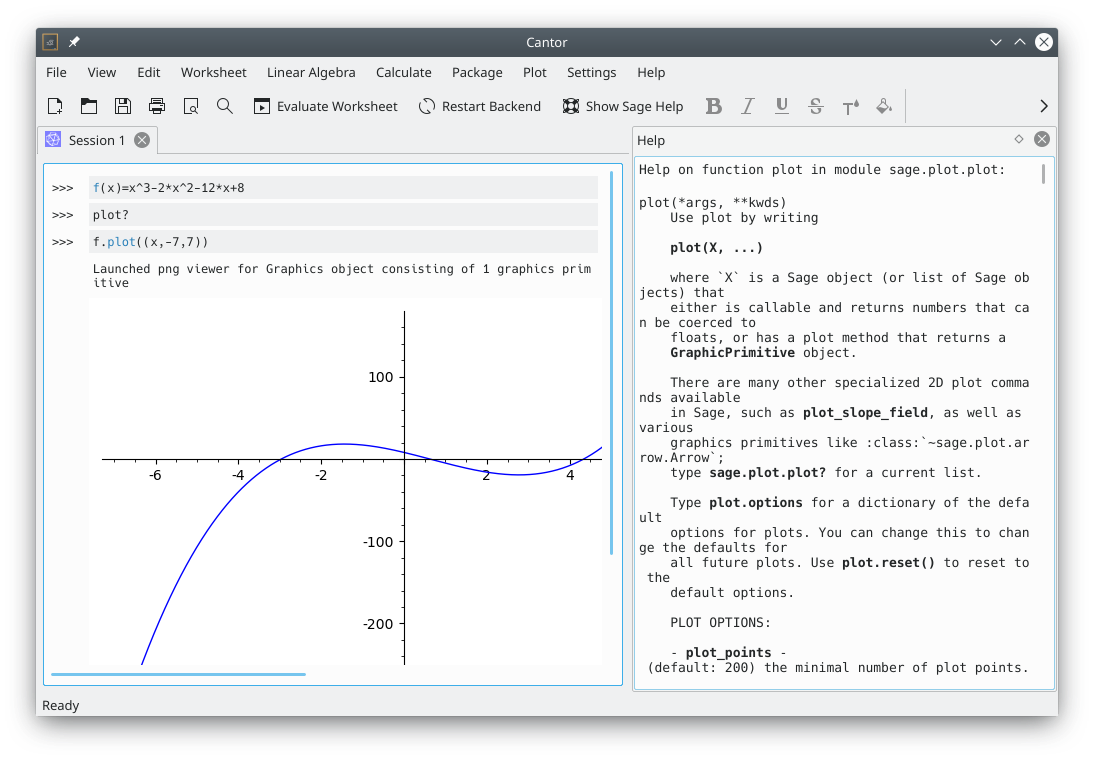
- Cantor 19.04 displaying the plot of a function
- Original author: Alexander Rieder
- Developer: KDE Education Project
- Release: 2009; 17 years ago
- Stable release: 26.08.1 / 10 September 2026; 2 days ago
- Written in: C++
- Operating system: Any Unix-like, Microsoft Windows, macOS
- Type: Mathematical software
- License: GPL
- Website: cantor.kde.org
- Repository: invent.kde.org/education/cantor

Cantor is a free software mathematics application for scientific statistics and analysis. It is part of the KDE Software Compilation 4, and was introduced with the 4.4 release as part of the KDE Education Project's kdeedu package.

== Features ==
Cantor is a graphical user interface that delegates its mathematical operations to one of several backends. Its plugin-based structure allows adding different backends. It can make use of Julia, KAlgebra, Lua, Maxima, Octave, Python, Qalculate!, R, SageMath, and Scilab.

Cantor provides a consistent interface to these backends; its project page lists the following features:

- Nice Worksheet view for evaluating expressions
- View of plotting results inside the worksheet or in a separate window
- Typesetting of mathematical formulas using LaTeX
- Backend-aware syntax highlighting
- Plugin-based assistant dialogs for common tasks (like integrating a function or entering a matrix)

Cantor was the first KDE project to implement upload to the GetHotNewStuff addon service, which is used to download or upload example worksheets. It provided impetus for improvement of this feature for KDE SC 4.4.
