= Remember Me (software) =

Application for memorizing Bible verses

- Developer: Poimena
- Initial release: March 24, 2010; 15 years ago
- Operating system: Android, iOS, web
- Available in: Chinese, Czech, Dutch, English, French, German, Italian, Hungarian, Japanese, Korean, Norwegian, Polish, Portuguese, Romanian, Russian, Spanish, Swedish, Ukrainian, Urdu
- Type: Educational software
- License: MIT License
- Website: www.remem.me

Remember Me is an app for memorizing Bible verses. It utilizes gamification, flashcards and spaced repetition algorithms to optimize learning and retention. The application is available on Android, iOS, and as a web application.

The development of Remember Me was driven by the need for a tool to learn Bible scriptures in an engaging and sustainable way. It was originally created by a Swiss pastor who was studying computer science at the University of Hagen and recognized the potential for a digital solution to support this aspect of religious study.

== Features ==
- Spaced repetition algorithms — Remember Me employs spaced repetition algorithms to optimize memorization by scheduling reviews at increasingly spaced intervals based on the user's performance.
- Integration with Bible translations — Users can import passages from other Bible apps and online Bible translations for creating flashcards.
- Voice recording and speech synthesis — Users can record their own voice reciting memorized passages or listen to verses using the device's text-to-speech functionality.
- Gamification elements — Remember Me incorporates gamification elements like word puzzles, gap tests, first letter input, high scores, daily goal, etc. to enhance user motivation and retention.
- Cross-device synchronization — The app replicates user data such as Bible verses and learning progress across multiple devices.

== Reception ==
The Bible memory app Remember Me has garnered significant popularity and has been downloaded over two million times. The app's success can be attributed to its user-friendly interface and its focus on helping users memorize Bible verses effectively.
