= FET (timetabling software) =

Timetabling application for educational institutions

FET Free Timetabling Software
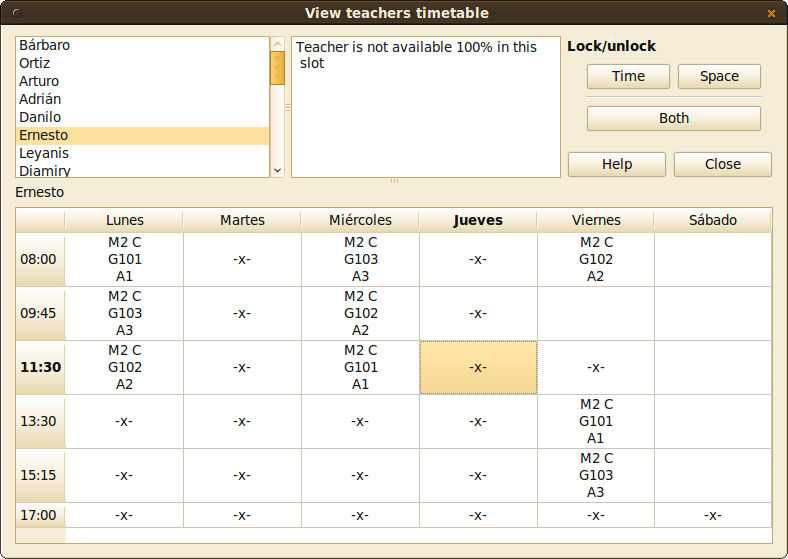
- Screenshot of FET, view of teachers timetable
- Original author: Liviu Lalescu
- Developers: Liviu Lalescu, Volker Dirr and others
- Release: 2002
- Stable release: 7.12.1 / November 11, 2026; 0 days ago
- Preview release: n/a
- Written in: C++
- Operating system: Windows, macOS, Linux
- Platform: Qt
- Size: 9.6–47.4 MiB
- Type: n/a
- License: GNU AGPL v3
- Website: lalescu.ro/liviu/fet/

FET is a free and open-source time tabling app for automatically scheduling the timetable of a school, high-school or university. FET is written in C++ using the Qt cross-platform application framework. Initially, FET stood for "Free Evolutionary Timetabling"; as it is no longer evolutionary, the E in the middle can stand for anything the user prefers.

FET can operate in different modes appropriate to a variety of special circumstances. In addition to the standard "Official" timetabling mode, there is a "Mornings-Afternoons" mode suitable for use with Moroccan or Algerian school systems, a "Block planning" mode that supports planning for block timetables (commonly used in North American and International Baccalaureate schools), and a "Terms" mode suitable for use with the Finnish school system.

== FET Features ==
- Localized to many languages;
- Fully automatic generation algorithm, allowing also semi-automatic or manual allocation;
- Platform independent implementation;
- Flexible modular XML format for the input file;
- Import/export from CSV format;
- The resulted timetables are exported into HTML, XML and CSV formats;

== See also ==
- Data management
- SchoolTool
