= Tellico (software) =

Collection management software

- Developer: Robby Stephenson
- Release: April 16, 2002; 24 years ago
- Stable release: 3.5.4 / 23 March 2024
- Written in: C++, XSLT
- Operating system: Linux, Mac OS X, FreeBSD, OpenBSD, NetBSD
- License: GPL-2.0-only or GPL-3.0-only
- Website: tellico-project.org
- Repository: invent.kde.org/office/tellico

Tellico is a KDE application for organizing various collections. It provides default templates for example for books, bibliographies, videos, music, video games, coins, stamps, trading cards, comic books, and wines. For custom collections data models are freely modifiable. Data can be entered manually or by downloading data from various Internet sources. Even though Tellico has default template also for data-files it has no jukebox or mediacenter like features.

Released under the GNU General Public License, Tellico is free software.

Tellico stores its collection files in XML format instead of SQL databases, which makes it easy for the users to export data or visualize it.

== See also ==
- Evergreen (software)
- Koha (software)
- PMB (software)
