= KmPlot =

KDE graphing application

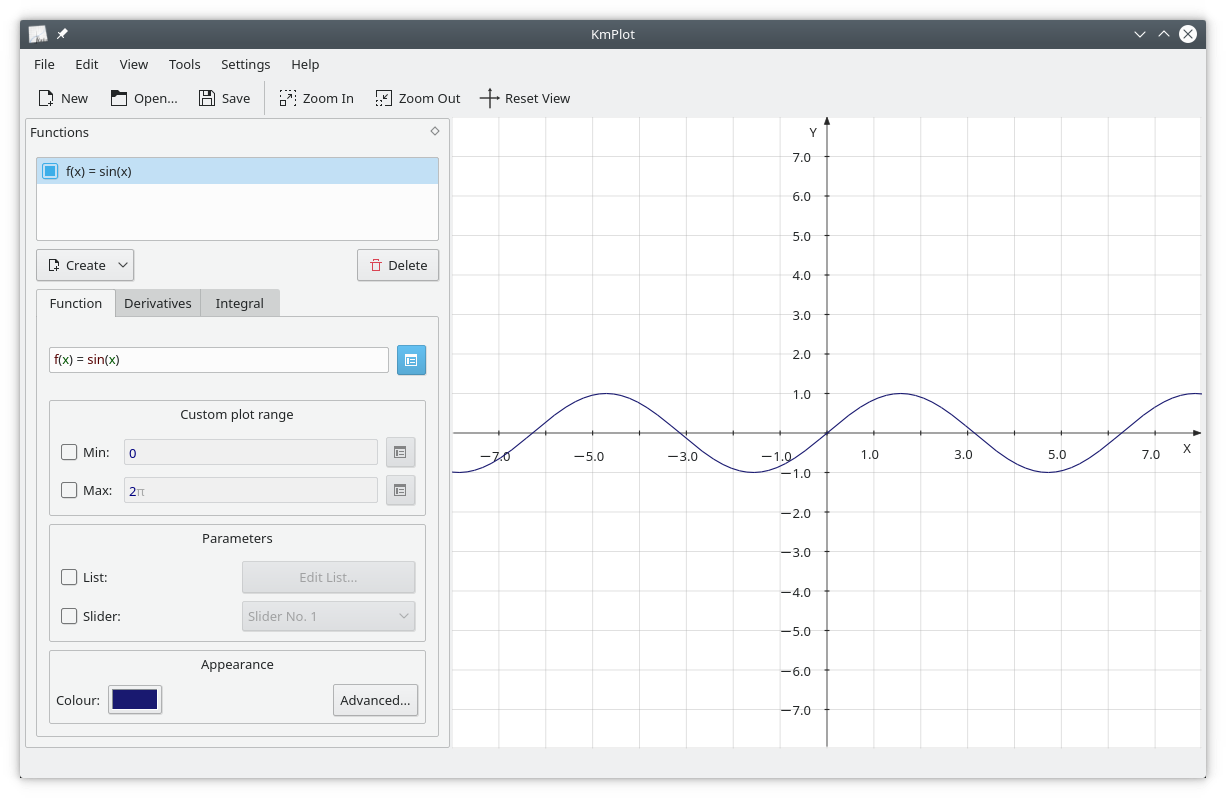
- Developer(s): KDE
- Repository: invent.kde.org/education/kmplot
- Written in: C++ (Qt)
- Operating system: Unix-like (BSDs, Linux, OS X), Windows
- Type: Mathematical software
- License: GNU GPL
- Website: www.kde.org/applications/education/kmplot/

KmPlot is a mathematical function plotter for the KDE Desktop bundled with the rest of the KDE Applications. The program is recommended for high school and college use. KmPlot came bundled with Edubuntu.

== Functions ==
KmPlot has a built in parser. Created graphs can be colored and the view can be scaled. It supports graphing multiple functions simultaneously. It also provides some numerical and visual features like filling and calculating the area between the plot and the first axis, finding maximum and minimum values, changing function parameters dynamically, and plotting derivatives and integral functions.

== See also ==
- Gnuplot
- Grapher
