= KAlarm =

Alarm software

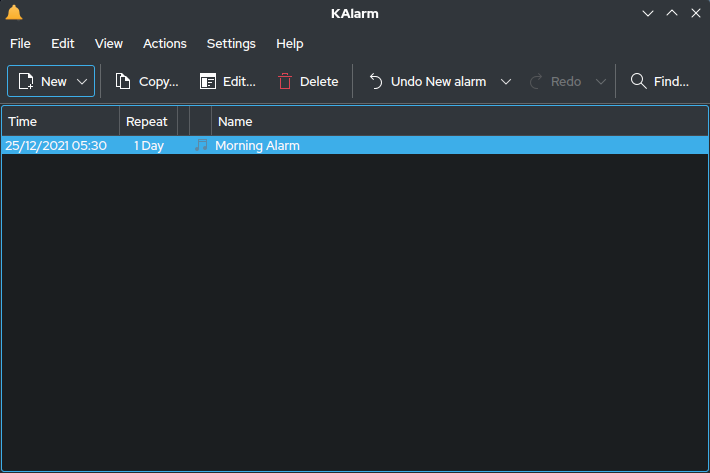
- Developer: David Jarvie
- Initial release: 2001-08-31
- Stable release: 21.12.0 / December 9, 2021
- Repository: invent.kde.org/pim/kalarm
- Operating system: Unix-like
- Available in: multilingual
- Type: Alarm clock
- License: GPL
- Website: apps.kde.org/kalarm/

KAlarm is a personal alarm message, command and email scheduler application integrated with the KDE desktop environment. When a scheduled alarm goes off, KAlarm can display a text message or image file, run a command, send an email or play a sound file, acting like an alarm clock. KAlarm supports the scheduling of multiple alarm times and alarm dates. Aside from control through the graphical interface KAlarm can also be operated using the command line.
