= REPLAY (software) =

REPLAY is a management system for audiovisual content developed at ETH Zurich.

== Background ==
REPLAY was developed as the future Multimedia Portal of ETH Zurich within the scope of the ICT strategy 2006–2009 and got branded „REPLAY“ in 2007. It is to manage the audiovisual content of ETH Zurich from production to distribution in an automated manner.

== Application area ==
The main focus of REPLAY is the quasi-automated handling of large number of lecture recordings (>150 per week) and to provide an integrated management solution for other video objects (films, digitization results etc.). Thus, it covers all the audiovisual material usually to be found in academic and other institutions (museums, companies etc.).

== Workflow ==
REPLAY covers the complete lifecycle of the audiovisual objects: In the classroom / lecture hall, the Linux-based Playmobil as an additional hardware component automatically captures audio, video, and VGA (for slides/presentations/computer display/other devices). After the lecture, these sources are bundled with metadata and proceeded into the REPLAY backend. Other video material can be ingested through an inbox.

All bundles are then:

- archived,
- indexed (based on slide content, using Optical Character Recognition),
- encoded according to settings and
- distributed in various channels (RSS, streaming, download etc.)

One of the distribution channels is Interplay, a user interface designed for interactive consumption of video.

== Qualities ==
REPLAY is written in Java, open source and oriented towards standards wherever possible. It is modular in design and envisaged to run on a singular machine as well as in a distributed environment.

== License ==
REPLAY is open source under GNU LGPL license version 2.

== Development ==
Development website. Replay has been developed towards release 0.7 (March 2009); as of June 2009 the project has ended and support was suspended by the end of 2009. Efforts around REPLAY and its technology are being transferred to the Opencast Matterhorn project.
