= Mailody =

E-mail client for the KDE Platform

- Developer(s): Tom Albers
- Stable release: 0.5.0 (final KDE3 version) / April 2, 2007
- Preview release: 1.5.0-beta1 (KDE SC 4 port) / November 30, 2008
- Operating system: Cross-platform
- Type: E-mail client
- License: GNU General Public License 2
- Website: www.mailody.net (former address)

Mailody is an e-mail client for the KDE Platform by Tom Albers.

Mailody has been discontinued. Tom Albers deleted it in the spring of 2010.

Unlike a complete mail client like KMail, the current stable version only works with the IMAP protocol, and does not support POP3.

The next version of Mailody was to use Akonadi as backend. Akonadi can fetch mail messages from multiple sources (e.g. IMAP, POP3, Maildir, Exchange) and also serves as a storage engine for these messages. Mailody’s current sqlite database engine would have been dropped as a consequence.

== See also ==
- KDE
- Akonadi
