= OpenEMIS =

- Original author(s): Community Systems Foundation
- Developer(s): UNESCO
- Operating system: Any (web-based application)
- Platform: PHP / AngularJS
- Type: Education Management Information System
- Website: openemis.org

OpenEMIS, or Open Education Management Information System (EMIS), is an Education Management Information System for the education sector. Its main purpose is to collect, analyze, and report data related to the management of educational activities. Initially conceived by UNESCO, OpenEMIS serves as a response to Member States’ need in the area of tools for educational strategic planning.

== History ==
UNESCO CSF Logo

OpenEMIS is an initiative launched by UNESCO. The initiative is in line with UNESCO's effort to promote EMIS to address the issues of access, equity, quality, and relevance in education and subsequent gaps between Member States in providing an adequate decision support system since early 2000s, in keeping with the Education for All goals adopted in Dakar in 2000. OpenEMIS was conceived to be a royalty-free software that can be customized to meet the specific needs of implementing countries, without conditions or restrictions for use, with the purpose of encouraging country-level capacity development and helping countries upgrade their local skills for managing the tool. The initiative is coordinated by UNESCO in partnership with a nonprofit organization (NPO), Community Systems Foundation (CSF) for the implementation and technical support since 2012.

== Architecture ==
OpenEMIS is a suite of interrelated software that supports data collection (Survey; Classroom; Staffroom), management (Core; School; Integrator), and analysis (Visualizer; Monitoring; Dashboard; Analyzer; DataManager; Profiles). Each application is designed to provide unique standalone features to support different information management requirements at different levels. These features could be customized and integrated with existing systems.

OpenEMIS Architecture Diagram

== Implementation ==
OpenEMIS is being implemented in the following countries. In nearly all cases, the Ministry of Education is central to implementation, with support and engagement with a wide range of stakeholders:

- Malaysia (UNHCR Malaysia, 2012–present)
- Grenada (OECS, 2013–present)
- St. Vincent and the Grenadines (OECS, 2013–present)
- Belize (Ministry of Education, Youth, Sports & Culture of Belize, 2014–present)
- Jordan (UNESCO Jordan, 2014–present)
- Maldives (Ministry of Education of Maldives, 2015–present)
- Turks and Caicos Islands (Ministry of Education of Jordan, 2016–present)
- Kyrgyz Republic (Ministry of Education of the Kyrgyz Republic, 2019–present)
- Namibia (Directorate of National Examinations and Assessment

== Support ==
Support is available to implementing countries with all aspects of country implementation from the technical support team. Support activities include services for: Policy and Planning; Analysis; Implementation; Custom Software Development; Training; and others as needed. System set up may involve cost for additional technical support for setup, configuration, migration, and capacity building.

== See also ==
- Datamining
- PHP
- Web 2.0
- Sustainable Development Goals (SDG) Goal: Quality Education (SDG4) Targets
