= Kiten (program) =

Japanese Kanji learning software

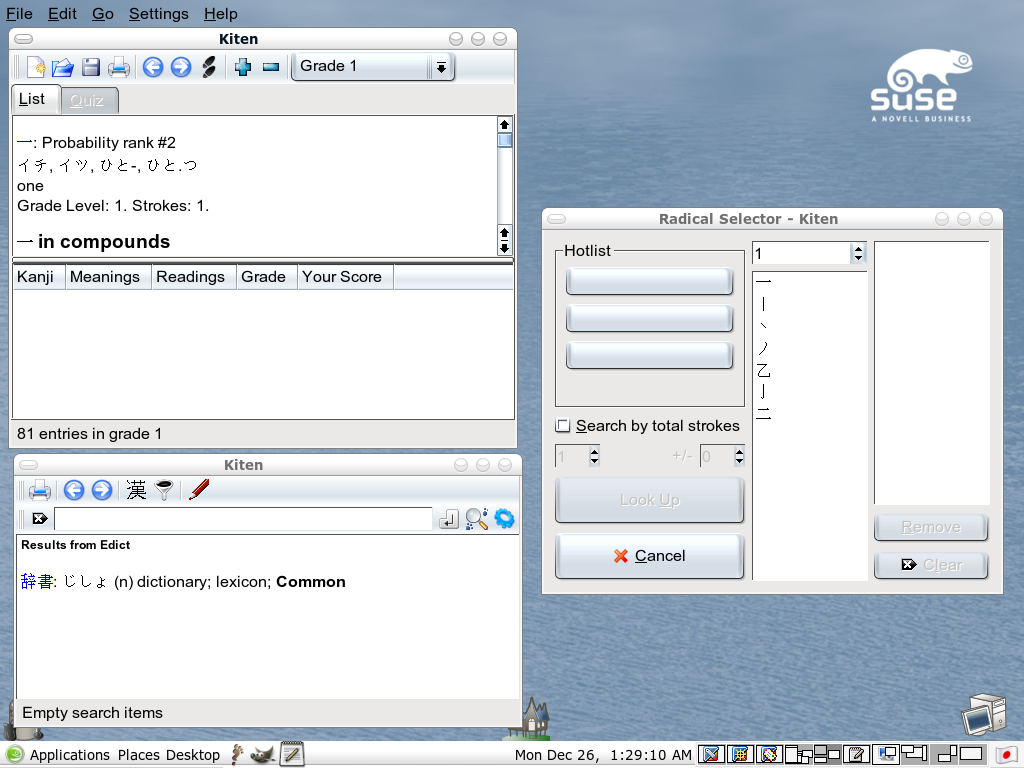
- Kiten 1.2 running on SuSE Linux 9.3 Professional.
- Developers: Jason Katz-Brown, Neil Stevens, Joseph Kerian, Eric Kjeldergaard, Daniel E. Moctezuma
- Stable release: 20.04.2 / 11 June 2020; 6 years ago
- Written in: C++ (KDELibs)
- Operating system: Linux, Windows
- Available in: English, Japanese
- License: GPL
- Website: edu.kde.org/kiten/
- Repository: invent.kde.org/education/kiten

Kiten is a Japanese Kanji learning tool and reference for the KDE Software Compilation, specifically, in the kdeedu package. It also works as a Japanese-to-English and English-to-Japanese dictionary. The user can input words into a search box, and all related Kanji are returned with their meaning and part of speech. Kanji can be filtered by rarity and part of speech. A list of Kanji is also available which sorts characters by grade level and stroke number. Selecting one shows its Onyomi, Kunyomi, and meanings. Users can also add Kanji to their "learn list" and get simple flashcard quizzes where the Kanji is displayed along with possible meanings to choose from.

The program was available only for Linux operating systems, but with the beta release of KDE for Windows, it is now available on Microsoft Windows.

== See also ==
Gjiten, a similar Gnome application
