= KLettres =

Educational program that helps the user learn the alphabet as well as pronunciation

- Developer: KDE
- Initial release: 2001
- Stable release: 24.12.1 / 9 January 2025; 11 months ago
- Repository: invent.kde.org/education/klettres
- Written in: C++
- Operating system: Unix-like (BSDs, Linux, macOS), Windows
- Type: Educational
- License: GNU GPL
- Website: edu.kde.org/klettres/

KLettres is an educational program that helps the users learn the alphabet as well as pronunciation. It is free and open source software, licensed under the terms of the GPL. The software is part of the KDE Education Project, and is meant to teach very young children aged 2 to 6 years the alphabet. There are currently 4 levels in the game and supports 25 different languages.

== Levels ==
KLettres features four levels, with settings for adult ("grown up") and children ("kid").

- In level 1, the letter is displayed and the user hears it.
- In level 2, the letter is not displayed and the user only hears it.
- In level 3, the syllable is displayed and the user hears it.
- In level 4, the syllable is not displayed and the user only hears it.

== Languages supported ==
Arabic, Czech, Brazilian Portuguese, Danish, Dutch, British English, English, English Phonix, French, German, Hebrew, Hungarian, Italian, Kannada, Hebrew, Hindi Romanized, Low Saxon, Luganda, Malayalam, Norwegian Bokmål, Punjabi, Spanish, Slovak, Ukrainian and Telugu.

== Release history ==
- May 13, 2004: v1.3, added Italian and special characters.
- March 8, 2005: Code refactoring, open usability review.
- March 14, 2005: 3 themes included (classroom, arctic and desert).
- March 15, 2005: Added Spanish and Romanized Hindi sounds.
- April 15, 2005: Support for Lunganda.
- July 15, 2006: German sounds added.
- September 23, 2006: Hebrew added.
- February 9, 2007: Low Saxon is added.
- November 2, 2007: 3 languages - Telugu, Kannada and Brazilian Portuguese is added with sound from a 9 year old.
- April 13, 2011: Milestone of 25 languages supported in KLettres.
