= KHangMan =

Computer game based on Hangman

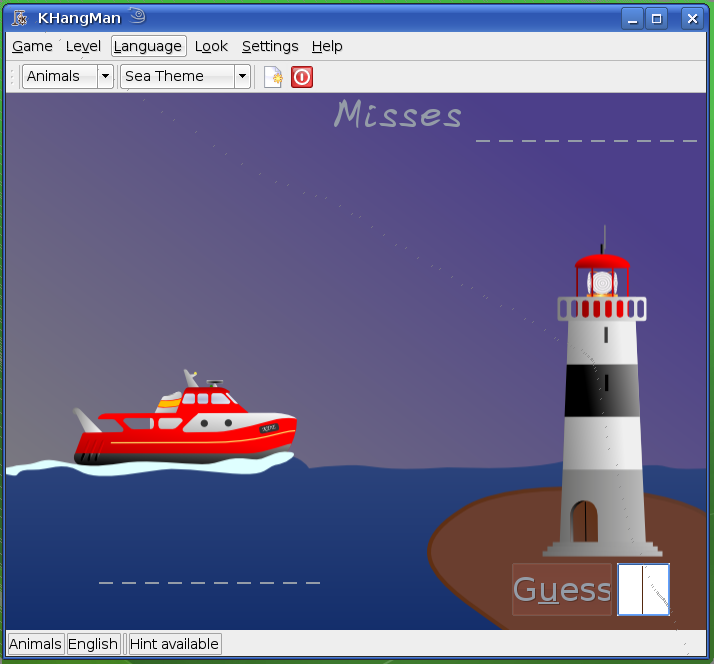
- Developer(s): Anne-Marie Mahfouf
- Stable release: 25.08.1 / 11 September 2025; 12 days ago
- Repository: cgit.kde.org/khangman.git/
- Written in: C++
- Operating system: Linux, Windows
- Website: edu.kde.org/khangman/

KHangMan is an educational computer game designed for young children based on the classic Hangman game. It is part of the KDE Software Compilation, specifically, in the kdeedu package.

The application features four themes (sea, winter, bee, and desert). In the sea theme, each incorrect guess makes a lighthouse project another piece of the hangman. In the winter theme, a snowman is partially melted after each incorrect guess. In the bee theme, a yellow hangman is created in the background. In the desert theme, a hangman is constructed next to a cactus. The player guesses letters one by one to attempt to figure out the word given. After ten incorrect guesses, the player loses and the word is revealed. A hint for each word can be activated in the options. Words are available in more than 30 languages and 18 categories.

The program was available only for Linux operating systems, but with the beta release of KDE for Windows, it is now available on Microsoft Windows.
