= Step (software) =

Open-source physics simulation engine

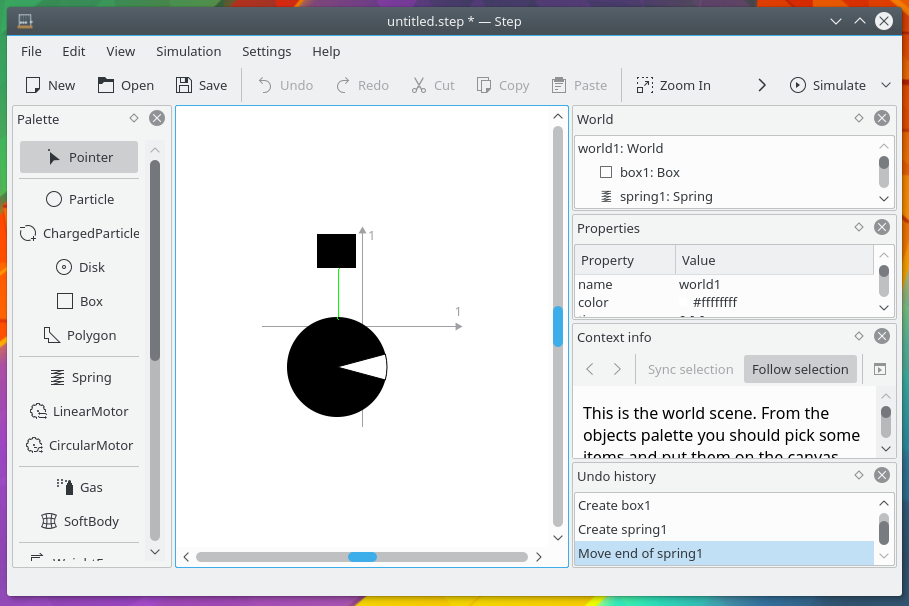
- A simulation of a gasoline system
- Original authors: Vladimir Kuznetsov; Carsten Niehaus; Aliona Kuznetsova
- Stable release: 23.04.3 / 6 July 2023; 2 years ago
- Written in: C++
- Operating system: Linux
- Available in: English
- Type: Educational
- License: GNU General Public License version 2
- Website: kde.org/applications/education/step
- Repository: invent.kde.org/education/step

Step is an open source two-dimensional physics simulation engine that is included in the KDE SC as a part of KDE Education Project. It includes StepCore, a physical simulation library.

== History ==
The program was developed by Vladimir Kuznetsov and introduced in February 2007. It was released along with KDE 4.1.

== Licensing ==
The program is licensed under the terms of GNU General Public License, making it free software.

== Description ==
Step is based on bodies and forces placed by the user:

- Bodies range from tiny particles to huge polygons, and each body has unique properties that influence the outcome of the simulation, such as mass and velocity, and their derivations such as kinetic energy.
- Forces can be either placed directly by the user or produced by adding gravitation, Coulomb force or other effects.

The program also features springs and soft bodies.

Step allows reverting after simulation, so the user can modify the bodies and forces and see how the outcome of the simulation is affected. All the bodies and forces can also be modified in real time.

The software allows users to add graphs and meters and configure them to any property of any body. This allows, for example, graphing speed or acceleration against time.
