= List of learning management systems =

The following is a list of learning management systems (LMS).

== Open source ==
- aTutor
- Canvas LMS
- Chamilo
- Claroline
- eFront
- FenixEdu
- ILIAS
- LAMS
- LON-CAPA
- Moodle
- Open edX
- OLAT
- OpenOLAT
- Sakai
- SWAD
- WeBWorK

== SAAS/Cloud ==
- CallidusCloud
- Cornerstone OnDemand Inc.
- DoceboLMS
- e-khool LMS
- Edsby
- eFront (eLearning software)
- EthosCE
- Google Classroom
- Grovo
- Growth Engineering
- Halogen Software
- imc Learning Suite
- itslearning
- Kannu
- Open edX
- OpenLearning
- SoftDeCC LMS

== Proprietary ==
- Blackboard Learn
- CERTPOINT Systems Inc.
- D2L (originally Desire2Learn, creator of Brightspace)
- eCollege
- EduNxt
- Engrade
- GlobalScholar
- Glow (Scottish Schools National Intranet)
- HotChalk
- Kahoot!
- Kannu
- Sakai
- SAP
- Skillsoft
- Spongelab
- SuccessFactors
- SumTotal Systems
- Taleo
- Uzity

== Historical ==
- ANGEL Learning (acquired by Blackboard in May 2009)
- Click2Learn and Docent merged to become SumTotal Systems in 2004
- CourseInfo LLC (precursor company to Blackboard, which became Blackboard's core technology, founded by Stephen Gilfus)
- Edmodo (closed in 2022)
- Elluminate (acquired by Blackboard in 2010)
- Learn.com (acquired by Taleo in 2010)
- PeopleSoft (acquired by Oracle in 2005)
- Plateau Systems (acquired by Successfactors in 2011)
- Softscape (acquired by SumTotal in 2010)
- SuccessFactors (acquired by SAP in 2012)
- SumTotal (acquired by Skillsoft in 2014)
- Taleo (acquired by Oracle in 2012)
- WebCT (acquired by Blackboard in 2005)
