= Vulcan (Polish software company) =

Polish software company

Vulcan sp. z o.o.
- Company type: Private
- Industry: Software
- Founded: 1988
- Founder: Feliks Sapiński
- Headquarters: Wrocław
- Key people: Jacek Różycki (Chairman)
- Brands: Dziennik Vulcan; eduVulcan; Prawo Optivum; UONET+
- Owner: Nowa Era sp. z o.o.
- Website: vulcan.edu.pl

Vulcan sp. z o.o. is a Polish software company founded in 1988. Its main activities include digital transformation of education. It is one of the most popular electronic grade book operators.

== History ==
It was founded in 1988 by Feliks Sapiński and created education software, a graphics editor, a spreadsheet and a text editor, for the Elwro 800 Junior and the ZX Spectrum, which it sold to the Ministry of Education. In 1996, with cooperation with PWN, the company worked on a computer encyclopedia, which sold 40 thousand copies, and later created Vulcan Media as a joint venture with PWN. In 1999 Vulcan Media was entirely bought out by PWN and rebranded as pwn.pl. In May 2006 Vulcan was bought out by Nowa Era.

== Products ==
The company offers school management software. It develops the Vulcan electronic grade book system, which can be accessed with a mobile phone application called eduVulcan. The company decided to put certain features of the app behind a paywall, such as Push notifications, messaging and absence notes, which attracted criticism. The company also creates Prawo Optivum, which is collection of unified legal acts related to education.

== eduVulcan ==
In September 2024, the company made changes to their school information system. Such as the option of creating a normal or an eduVulcan account. The normal account has a different login for every child, which is made out of letters and numbers not associated with the parent's e-mail address or name, it also requires a different URL for every school and cannot be changed. In comparison, the eduVulcan account has only one login, which could be changed and accessed from one site.

A new mobile app has been released, which can only be used with an eduVulcan account. The mobile app includes "enhanced" features such as Push notifications, messaging and absence notes, which cost around 40PLN annually. These features were previously free. Users had problems with creating accounts and logging into the system.

The company was met with criticism from parent and students for requiring payment for features. An online petition has been started in opposition to the changes. Politician Adrian Zandberg made an interpellation to the Minister of Education Barbara Nowacka, he said that the country has enough resources to deliver a free platform. Vice-minister of Education Izabela Ziętka stated, that the company is not breaking the law. When asked about a possible creation of a free platform for communication between parents and teachers, she said that "ideas are appearing" but that they would require "talks with the Ministry of Digital Affairs, Center of Education Informatics and – most importantly – the General Inspector of Protection of Personal Information".
