= Learning Tools Interoperability =

Education technology specification by IMS Global Learning Consortium

Learning Tools Interoperability (LTI) is a standard developed by 1EdTech formerly known as IMS Global Learning Consortium at the time of creation. It enables seamless integration between learning systems and external systems. In its current version, v1.3, this is done using OAuth2, OpenID Connect, and JSON Web Tokens. For example, a Learning Management System (LMS) may use LTI to host course content and tools provided by external or third-party systems on a website without requiring a learner to log in separately on the external systems. The LTI will also share learner information and the learning context shared by the LMS with the external systems.

== History ==
Like its predecessor SCORM, LTI was instigated by the United States Department of Defense.

- Learning Tools Interoperability, formerly called Basic LTI, was originated in 2008 as a Google Summer of Code project. It was developed by Jordi Piguillem under the mentorship of Charles Severance and Marc Alier.
- In June 2010, Learning Tools Interoperability version 1.0 was finalized.
- In August 2012, Learning Tools Interoperability version 1.1 introduced a feature allowing external tools to send grade results back to the originating learning system.
- In January 2014, Learning Tools Interoperability version 2.0 was launched, introducing REST-based two-way communication between external tools and the learning platform. Simultaneously, a subset of version 2.0 was released as version 1.2, as a transitional update from version 1.1 to version 2.0.
- Due to their complexity, adoption of Learning Tools Interoperability version 1.2 and version 2.0 was slow. Consequently, IMS Global learning consortium reclassified them to as “legacy specifications”, advising against upgrading from Learning Tools Interoperability version 1.1 due to security concerns.
- In May 2019, the IMS Security Framework and Learning Tools Interoperability version 1.3 were published based on OAuth2, OpenID Connect, and JWT. Learning Tools Interoperability version 1.0, version 1.1, version 1.2 and version 2.0 were all deprecated.

== Adoption ==
LTI has been adopted by many large educational content providers, including Pearson and McGraw Hill. Popular Learning Management Systems, such as D2L Brightspace, Instructure Canvas, Blackboard, BenchPrep, LAMS, OpenLearning, Sakai, Moodle, Totara, iTeach, EduWave K-12, IMC-Scheer, DynDevice LMS and Open edX also support LTI.
