= SWAD (software) =

Web application

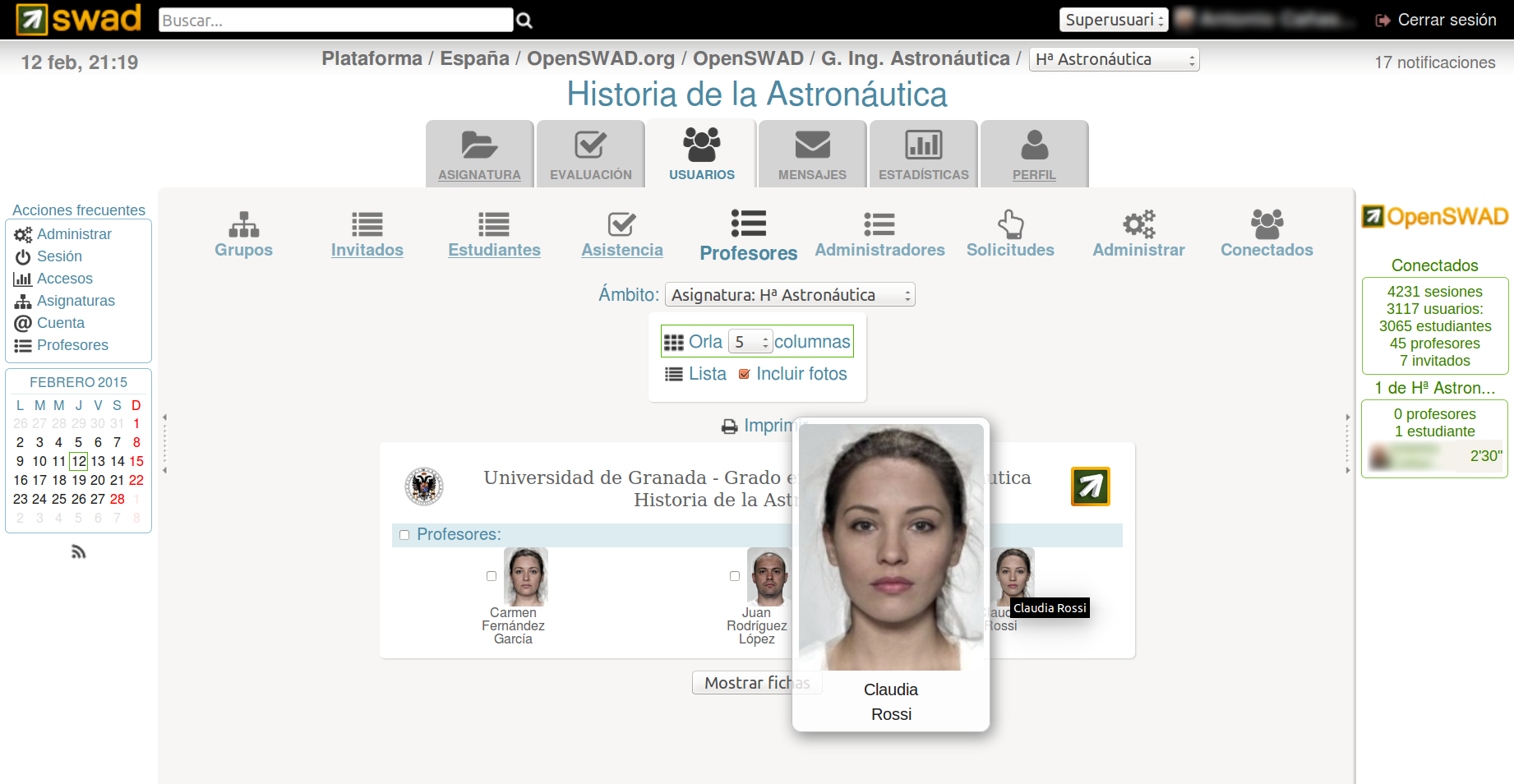
- SWAD LMS
- Original author(s): SWAD development team
- Developer(s): SWAD development team
- Stable release: 23.48.2 / November 26, 2023; 19 months ago
- Repository: github.com/acanas/swad-core
- Written in: C, C++
- Operating system: Linux server
- Type: Course management system
- License: AGPLv3
- Website: OpenSWAD.org

SWAD (originally stood for "Sistema Web de Apoyo a la Docencia" in Spanish or "Web System for Education Support", currently stands for "Shared Workspace At a Distance") is a web application to manage the courses, students and teachers of one or more educational institutions.

== History ==
The first version of SWAD appeared in September 1999. In 2005, its use was extended to the University of Granada. The application was released as free software in January 2010 under Affero General Public License, version 3. In 2010, the system was used by 1,100 professors and 35,000 students. In 2011, it was used by 2,000 professors and 60,000 students in 2,800 courses.

SWAD is currently available in 9 languages and used in the University of Granada and the portal OpenSWAD.org. In November 2019 SWAD installation at the University of Granada housed 488 degrees (including undergraduate and graduate) with 7496 courses, 126,060 students and 3514 teachers.

The objectives addressed in the development of the platform SWAD can be specified depending on its potential beneficiaries:

- For teachers and other administrators of the platform, the objectives were carrying through internet the management tasks related to a course and its students, and improved mentoring and general communication with them.
- For students, the objectives have been improved access to materials and information of the courses, the possibility of self-assessment at a distance, and the improvement of the communication both student-student and student-teacher.

A fundamental criterion at the development of the platform has been to facilitate its use by users, emphasizing both the ease of learning and use for students and teachers (usability), and the time saving and quality improvement in various tasks related to teaching.

For the institution or company, SWAD has the additional advantage of being fast and efficient, consuming very little computer resources, so being suitable for low-cost installations. Compared to other tools used for the same purpose, since its implementation in C language, SWAD does not require a big hardware and software infrastructure, even in large universities, being sufficient a single server.

== Technical specifications ==
=== Server ===
SWAD core is a CGI programmed in C comprising almost all the functionality of the platform. The core is supplemented with some external programs like photo processing module and chat module.

The server runs on a Linux system with Apache and a MySQL or MariaDB database.

=== Clients ===
Being a web application, the client can be any modern web browser. To use the chat you must have Java runtime environment.

Besides the web client, there is an M-learning application for Android devices called SWADroid, which implements some of the most used features in the web version.

== Hierarchy and roles ==
=== Hierarchical organization ===
SWAD can accommodate in a single platform one or multiple educational organizations. It uses the following hierarchical structure:

- Countries
- Institutions (universities, academies, organizations, companies,...)
- Centres (faculties, buildings,...)
- Degrees (degrees, master's,...)
- Courses
- Group types (lectures, practicals, seminars,...)
- Groups (A, B, morning, afternoon,...)

The central element of this hierarchy is the course, which can register several teachers and students.

=== Roles ===
Each user has a role of student, non-editing teacher or teacher at each of the course in which he/she is enrolled. In addition, some users may be administrators of one or more degrees, centres or institutions, as well as global administrators of the platform.

== See also ==
- Virtual Learning Environment
- Learning Management System
- ATutor
- Chamilo
- Claroline
- ILIAS
- Moodle
- Sakai Project
