= Learning nugget =

Learning nuggets is a standalone mini learning activity, usually less than 5 minutes in length, that would vary in size and scope that learners undertake in a particular context in order to attain specific learning outcomes A learning nugget task will take a prescribed length of time and may, or may not be assessed. Nuggets should be designed with a particular approach to learning and teaching in mind (Conole & Fill, 2005)

Learning nuggets are the essential elements of the Subscription Learning approach. In this context, the learning happens through a stream of intermittent nuggets which involves a variety of learning-related events which include "content presentation, diagnostics, scenario-based questions, job aids, reflection questions, assignments, discussions, etc. The nuggets are delivered to the learner in many formats like email, text message, smart-phone notifications, or any other form of prompting. They are designed to be delivered on predetermined intervals to support learning. The series of learning nuggets are called learning threads. For utmost effective learning, sending a learning nugget could be dynamically triggered by many factors like learners' leaning need, results of a learning assessment or learners' performance.

== Examples of Learning Nuggets ==
Fujitsu and MIT described some examples of Learning Nuggets as follows:

- Homework problem to be done online
- A video snippet
- Pop quiz for self-assessment of content knowledge
- An animation, possibly interactive
- A simulation
- A web-based lab experiment
- A short educational game
- A learning-based work experience builder
- A small section of textual material typically less than one page long.

== See also ==
- Microcontent
- Microformats
- Microlecture
