= Electronic grade book =

Online record of students' educational progress

An electronic grade book is a teacher's online record of their students' lessons, assignments, progress, and grades. An electronic grade book interfaces with a student information system which houses a school district's student records including grades, attendance medical records, transcripts, student schedules, and other data. Some electronic grade books make grades, homework, and student schedules available online to parents and students.

In 2010 the British Government agency for ICT in education, BECTA, put in place a requirement for report cards for all pupils in the comprehensive school system to have their reports made available to parents online.

== See also ==
- GlobalScholar
- Report card
