= Grovo =

Microlearning platform

- Founded: October 1, 2010; 16 years ago
- Area served: Global
- CEO: Steven Carpenter
- Industry: learning technology
- Website: www.cornerstoneondemand.com/solutions/content/grovo/

Grovo is a New York City-based company established in 2010 by Jeff Fernandez, Nick Narodny, and Surag Mungekar that develops a software-as-a-service (SaaS) platform focused on microlearning, to allow users to create, manage, and distribute educational content.

== History ==
Grovo was established in 2010 by Jeff Fernandez, Nick Narodny, and Surag Mungekar. The company initially operated as a consumer-focused company providing video training for digital skills. In early 2013, Grovo transitioned to a B2B SaaS model, concentrating on the development of a microlearning platform.

In May 2017, Axios reported that Grovo encountered financial difficulties, which contributed to the departure of its founders.

In November 2018, Grovo was acquired by management solutions provider Cornerstone OnDemand, for $24 million.

== Business model ==
Grovo operates on a SaaS (Software-as-a-Service) learning platform. Grovo refers to its approach as microlearning, delivering 144-second video and audio lessons interspersed with short quizzes and practice assignments. In November 2017, Grovo announced that it had submitted a trademark application for the term microlearning with the U.S. Patent and Trademark Office. Grovo's microlearning library includes topics such as digital skills, soft skills, management training, and human resource/compliance training. Trainers and managers have access to a dashboard with learning management system tools, training analytics, and a client service team that aligns learning strategy with business goals.

== Investors and funding ==
In May 2011, Grovo secured seed funding from Krishna "Kittu" Kolluri, general partner at New Enterprise Associates, Andy Dunn, CEO and Founder of Bonobos, Mareza Larizadeh of Larizadeh Capital Partners and a few others.

On July 17, 2013, Grovo announced a $5.5 million Series A round of venture capital funding. Greg Waldorf, CEO-in-residence at Accel Partners, who was also a founding investor and former CEO of eHarmony, led the financing, which also included Jeff Clavier of SoftTech VC, Greg Sands of Costanoa Venture Capital, and Andy Dunn of Red Swan Ventures. Greg Waldorf joined Grovo's board of directors.

On February 18, 2015, Grovo announced a $15 million Series B round from existing investors Accel Partners, Costanoa Venture Capital, Greg Waldorf, and SoftTech VC. The series B funding round closed on August 8, 2014. Accel's Sameer Gandhi and Kirk Bowman joined Grovo's Board of Directors.

In January 2016, Grovo secured $40 million in a Series C funding round led by Accel Partners. Additional contributions came from existing investors Costanoa Venture Capital, SoftTech VC, and Greg Waldorf, along with new investor Vayner Capital. This brings Grovo's total funding to $65 million.

In November 2018, Grovo was acquired by management solutions provider Cornerstone OnDemand for $24 million.

== Recognitions ==
CNNMoney named Grovo one of the "30 Most Disruptive Upstarts". Entrepreneur named the company one of the "Best Entrepreneurial Companies in America" and one of the "Best Company Cultures in 2015". The company was named "New York Startup of the Year" by Tech.Co, and listed on the Crain's New York Business Top 100 Best Places to Work 2015. PC Magazine named Grovo one of the top learning management systems of 2015.

== See also ==
- Competency management system
- Educational technology
- Microcontent
- Microlearning
