= MCCB =

MCCB may stand for:

- Mississippi Community College Board
- Molded Case Circuit Breaker, a type of low-voltage circuit breaker
- Mount Carmel College of Baler
