= Atomic Object =

American software development consultancy

- Type: Private
- Industry: Custom software
- Founded: 2001; 25 years ago in Grand Rapids, Michigan
- Founders: Carl Erickson, Bill Bereza
- Headquarters: Grand Rapids, Michigan, US
- Number of locations: 4 (2026)
- Key people: Shawn Crowley (Co-CEO), Mike Marsiglia (Co-CEO)
- Number of employees: 125
- Website: atomicobject.com

Atomic Object is an American, employee-owned custom software development consultancy. Headquartered in Grand Rapids with additional offices in Ann Arbor, Chicago, and Raleigh-Durham, Atomic Object focuses on the early phases of software product design and development.

== History ==
Atomic Object was cofounded in 2001 by Carl Erickson and Bill Bereza in Grand Rapids, Michigan. Bereza left the company in 2009.

In 2014, the company began hosting Atomic Games, a computer programming challenge that requires software developers to create an artificial intelligence (AI) over one weekend

In May 2019, co-founder Carl Erickson transitioned from chief executive officer and appointed Shawn Crowley and Mike Marsiglia as co-chief executive officers.
