= Edu Effective Business School =

Educational institution in Prague, Czech Republic

EDU Effective Business School
- EDU Effective
- Founded: 2020
- Founder: Pavel Makovský
- Type: Professional education institution
- Headquarters: Antala Staška 1859/34, 140 00 Prague 4, Czech Republic
- Location: Prague, Czech Republic
- Region served: International (online)
- Services: Professional education programs
- Website: www.edueffective.online

EDU Effective Business School (EDU Effective) is a professional education institution based in Prague, Czech Republic. It provides online education programs primarily focused on business, management, law, and public administration. The institution uses an online learning model designed for working adults and international students.

On 5 May 2023, EDU Effective received accreditation as a Premier Institution from the Accreditation Service for International Schools, Colleges & Universities (ASIC).

== History ==
EDU Effective was established in the Czech Republic in 2020 by Pavel Makovský. Makovský is an entrepreneur and educator who has also been associated with the establishment of LIGS University.

The organization operates under the legal name EDU Effective, z.s. Czech public-register records identify the organization under IČO 22691367 and list its registered office in Prague 4.

== Location and organization ==
EDU Effective is headquartered in Prague, Czech Republic. Its registered address is Antala Staška 1859/34, 140 00 Prague 4.

The institution provides its programs primarily through an online learning environment, allowing students to study remotely.

== Programs ==
EDU Effective offers professional programs in several fields, including:

- Effective MBA (Master of Business Administration)
- Effective MSc. (Master of Science)
- Effective LL.M. (Master of Laws)
- Effective MPA (Master of Public Administration)
- Effective MHA (Master of Health Administration)

The programs cover areas such as business administration, management, finance, marketing, law, public administration, and related professional subjects.

== Learning model ==
EDU Effective uses a microlearning approach in its online programs. Learning materials are divided into short units that can be completed in relatively short daily study sessions.

Czech media have reported on the institution's use of microlearning for MBA-oriented education, describing a model based on approximately 15 minutes of study per day.

Microlearning is also an established area of educational research. Academic studies have examined its use in higher and continuing education and its potential to support flexible digital learning.
