= QuickSchools.com =

- Type: Privately held
- Industry: Student information system
- Founded: 2008
- Headquarters: Beaverton, Oregon
- Key people: Aris Yahaya, Azreen Latiff
- Products: QuickSchools student information system
- Revenue: Not disclosed
- Website: QuickSchools.com

QuickSchools.com is an online school management system published by Maestro Planning Solutions, Kuala Lumpur, Malaysia, in 2002.

== Origins ==
In January 2008, Maestro published school administrative software as an online system, and it was subsequently branded as QuickSchools.com a fully online school management system for small schools.

On August 17, 2009, QuickSchools released a brand new version of its school management system.

== Service details ==
=== Manage school applications ===
The system allows users to log details of inquiries from parents or guardians and keep track of their contact details. Student applications can also be maintained along with grades achieved during any entrance exams.

=== Student information management ===
Details such as picture, subjects taken, classes attended, grades and extra-curricular activities can be tracked. Student grading can also be done for end of term reports and can be printed out in PDF.

=== Parents' portal ===
Parents can track the progress of their children on a daily basis. This makes it very hard if the student wants to cut, is missing an assignment, or is just plain tardy. The system will be sending parents e-mail notification as soon as the teacher marks a student late/absent.

=== Online Master Scheduler ===
QuickSchools launched their stand-alone master scheduler in 2021 named Orchestra. Their cloud-based master schedule builder is designed for K12 and colleges. Orchestra introduces innovations to the master schedule-building exercise that saves time and makes the process go more smoothly.

=== Other features ===
Schedules can be generated for students, teachers, subjects and classrooms. Flexible to the type of information that the school wants to track about students. Foreign language character support for Arabic & Chinese are currently available.

== Technology ==
QuickSchools.com is based on Maestro's optimalOne platform. QuickSchools.com runs on a Java EE backend. The front-end runs on Adobe Flash (previously Macromedia Flash). The use of Flash enables QuickSchools.com to run on many different browsers and on different operating systems. It also enables the Web2.0-style interface. Servers are located in 2 locations around the world. The first location was established in Malaysia in January 2008, and the second location was established in Seattle, US in August 2008.
