= Element K =

Element K may refer to:

- The chemical element Potassium given symbol K (Latin kalium)
- An educational software package owned by Skillsoft
