= FenixEdu =

Software project

- Formerly: Projecto Fénix
- Industry: Educational Software
- Founded: 1999
- Headquarters: Lisbon, Portugal
- Products: FenixEdu Academic, FenixEdu Learning, OddJet, Bennu; Open source software
- Number of employees: 21
- Website: fenixedu.org

FenixEdu is a software project focused on developing open-source software for schools. The core development team currently works out of Instituto Superior Técnico, Lisbon.

The goal of this project is to develop a large suite of software products that schools can easily install and configure, with very little resources. The project also serves as an advanced engineering training group for students of Instituto Superior Técnico, by giving them a realistic software development environment without the pressures of a professional setting. The motivation behind this project is to optimize the teaching process, which increases the speed of scientific and cultural development, ultimately leading to faster societal advancement.

== History ==
The project started around 1999 when Instituto Superior Técnico felt the need to update their student information systems, originally written in COBOL. The school started Project Fénix as a research project involving several final degree projects with the objective to create a new software platform, called Fénix, that would serve the school's administrative needs. Early on, the project released its software as open-source, as a way for the academic community to contribute back and for the system to serve as a teaching tool, particularly to software engineering students. Over the next 12 years the project grew to manage almost all school tasks, from grading to parking.

By 2012, the system covered many school tasks. However, it was a monolithic platform, making it difficult to deploy to other schools, as a team of specialized developers was required. It was around this time, when the system started growing beyond one school, that the project restructured and rebranded itself into FenixEdu. The focus was to develop easy-to-deploy, modular, and customizable pieces of software that schools could customize to match their needs, requiring no more than one person to fully configure an installation. Over the next few years, the original platform source code was cleaned, Instituto Superior Técnico-specific code was removed, and the system was divided into individual modules that could be independently selected and reused.

== Projects ==
As of 2014, FenixEdu has released four individual software packages:

- FenixEdu Academic, an open-source Student Information System.
- FenixEdu Learning, an open-source Learning Management System.
- OddJet, a reporting library designed to work with OpenOffice documents.
- Bennu, a web framework integrated with the Fenix Framework persistence system.

== See also ==
- FenixEdu Academic
- FenixEdu Learning
- Free Software Foundation
- Open Software Foundation
- List of learning management systems
