= Gvahim =

Israeli non-profit organization supporting professional integration of immigrants

Gvahim (Hebrew: גבהים, lit. "Heights") is an Israeli non-profit organization that assists new immigrants (olim) and returning residents with professional and entrepreneurial integration into the Israeli labor market. Founded in 2006, it operates under the auspices of the Rashi Foundation.

== History ==
Gvahim was established in 2006 as a job-placement center for highly educated new immigrants, founded by the Rashi Foundation together with a group of Israeli businessmen, with early support from AAEGE Israel, a French university alumni network, and AMI. The organization initially worked with immigrants from France, many of them graduates of the grandes écoles, before expanding its activity to immigrants from additional countries of origin. Of the first 130 participants in the program, 77 percent found a job within six months of completing it. By 2010, roughly 70 percent of participants held a master's degree or higher, with an age range of 22 to 55.

The organization was co-founded by Mickael Bensadoun, an immigrant from Morocco who had previously worked as an advisor at the Rashi Foundation, together with Yair Shamir, an Israeli businessman and former Israeli Air Force colonel who later served as chairman of Israel Aerospace Industries and as a Knesset member and Minister of Agriculture. Shamir served as chairman of Gvahim from 2006 to 2013, and was succeeded as chairman by Moshe Mor, a founding partner of Greylock Israel. Gali Shahar (also referred to as Gali Shahar-Efrat) served as the organization's executive director through the end of 2017, and was succeeded by Juan Taifeld, who immigrated to Israel from Mexico in 1991.

In August 2012, then-Governor of the Bank of Israel Stanley Fischer spoke at Gvahim's annual event, describing the organization's work as helping to offset Israel's "brain drain" by drawing skilled immigrants in the opposite direction. Gvahim opened a Jerusalem office in 2015, in partnership with the Jerusalem Municipality; Jerusalem Mayor Nir Barkat attended the office's launch event, at which the organization reported having placed more than 1,300 immigrants in jobs since 2006, with an 88 percent success rate. In January 2026, Gvahim marked twenty years since its founding, alongside ten years of its partnership with the Jerusalem Municipality.

== Programs ==
Gvahim operates a career development program in Tel Aviv, Jerusalem, and other Israeli cities, in partnership with local municipalities, consisting of group workshops, one-on-one career consultations, and mentoring by volunteers from participants' professional fields. According to figures reported by the organization, as of 2020 more than 3,000 people had taken part in its career programs, drawn from more than 60 countries, with an average participant age of 32 and a reported one-year job placement rate of 91 percent.

TheHive, a startup accelerator for immigrant entrepreneurs, launched in Tel Aviv in January 2012 in a ceremony attended by Golan Telecom founder Michael Golan and chairman Yair Shamir; it was co-directed by Cynthia Phitoussi and Audrey Chocron. A second TheHive location opened in Ashdod in 2011 in partnership with the local municipality. According to figures reported by the organization, by the late 2010s the accelerator had supported more than 120 startups founded by entrepreneurs from 25 countries, which had collectively raised more than $20 million in capital. TheNest, a related seven-week incubator program for immigrants opening small businesses, launched around 2015 and holds sessions twice a year.

A pre-aliyah program, marketed as "Aliyah Prep", offers online workshops for prospective immigrants, including a track for software engineers, data scientists, and electrical engineers considering employment in Israel's technology sector. An "Olim Medical" program supports doctors immigrating from France with license recognition, job placement, and mentoring; according to figures the organization provided to researchers, the program had helped bring 110 doctors to Israel by the end of the decade following its 2016 launch.

Following the 2022 Russian invasion of Ukraine and the subsequent increase in immigration from Russia, Ukraine, and Belarus, the organization introduced subsidized Russian-language career programming for new arrivals from those countries. In 2022, the Israel Innovation Authority also partnered with Gvahim and the training provider Infinity Labs R&D on an initiative to recruit technology workers from abroad, though Globes reported that this program was not specifically focused on the Russian or Ukrainian markets. In December 2024, the Innovation Authority named Gvahim as one of three organizations, alongside Nish Hitech and ScienceAbroad, participating in a government-funded initiative to recruit artificial-intelligence specialists from abroad for Israeli technology companies.

In 2021, Gvahim partnered with the immigrant-support organization ESRA to launch a joint website, "Get It Right in Israel", intended as a shared resource for community life and professional development among olim.

== Studies and data ==
Gvahim has periodically released data on immigrant employment drawn from its own program participants. A 2017 organizational study on the employment of highly educated immigrants, reported by Ynet, found that only 19 percent of employed participants held senior management roles, 22 percent held junior management roles, and the remainder worked in non-managerial positions; respondents most frequently cited language and accent difficulties (86 percent) and unfamiliarity with the local labor market (80 percent) as barriers. In 2018, data released by the organization and reported by TheMarker ranked Israeli companies by the number of new immigrants hired between 2015 and 2017, with Amdocs, Cornerstone OnDemand, and ICE identified as the leading employers.

== Affiliations ==
Gvahim is a subsidiary of the Rashi Foundation. It has partnered with the Jerusalem Municipality since around 2015, and has collaborated with Nefesh B'Nefesh on programs aimed at highly skilled immigrants, including an initiative to attract immigrants to Israel's Negev region.
