= EthosCE =

Healthcare-related learning management system

- Developer(s): DLC Solutions
- Stable release: 7.19 / 4 April 2019
- Written in: PHP
- Available in: English
- Type: Learning management system Continuing Medical Education; Continuing Education
- License: Proprietary commercial software
- Website: www.ethosce.com

EthosCE is a learning management system for the administration of continuing medical education in nursing, pharmacy and other healthcare-related programs. Developed by DLC Solutions, it provides interfaces for organizations to produce and manage continuing education websites. Distribution is provided as a software-as-a-service web application.

The administrative interface allows users to administer the system through a web browser and supports online and mobile registration of learners and communication for in-person and online training events. The application includes online transcripts, tracking of professional certifications, and an integration with the Accreditation Council for Continuing Medical Education (ACCME) Program and Reporting System (PARS) web service.

== API ==
The EthosCE Course object API can be used to define learning objects to be added to a workflow with built in support for Drupal nodes to be part of a course requirement workflow including multiple course objects. The API allows other content/assessments or non-Drupal (external) objects to be delivered and tracked as course content, and it provides access to taking or enrolling learners into courses.

== Development ==
EthosCE was originally released 14 April 2009 by DLC Solutions. Version 7.4 discontinued support for creating Moodle course objects and integrated an external SCORM/TinCan/xAPI player and was released 12 December 2014.

== See also ==
- List of learning management systems
