= Talent management system =

Integrated software suite that addresses the "four pillars" of talent management

A talent management system (TMS) is an integrated software suite that addresses the "four pillars" of talent management: recruitment; performance management; learning and development; and compensation management.

== Purpose ==
Whereas traditional HRMS and enterprise resource planning (ERP) systems focus primarily on transaction processing and the administration of basic human resources processes such as personnel administration, payroll, time management, etc., talent management systems focus on providing strategic assistance to organizations in the accomplishment of long-term enterprise goals with respect to talent, or human capital. Talent management systems may also be referred to as or paired with an applicant tracking system (ATS) in either standalone application or as a suite of products. According to Bersin, talent management may be defined as the implementation of integrated strategies or systems designed to improve processes for recruiting, developing, and retaining people with the required skills and aptitude to meet current and future organizational needs.

== Functional modules and their market worth ==
TMS solutions typically offer one or many disparate or integrated modules which provide business functionality in areas of human capital management / human resources typically referred to as "strategic".

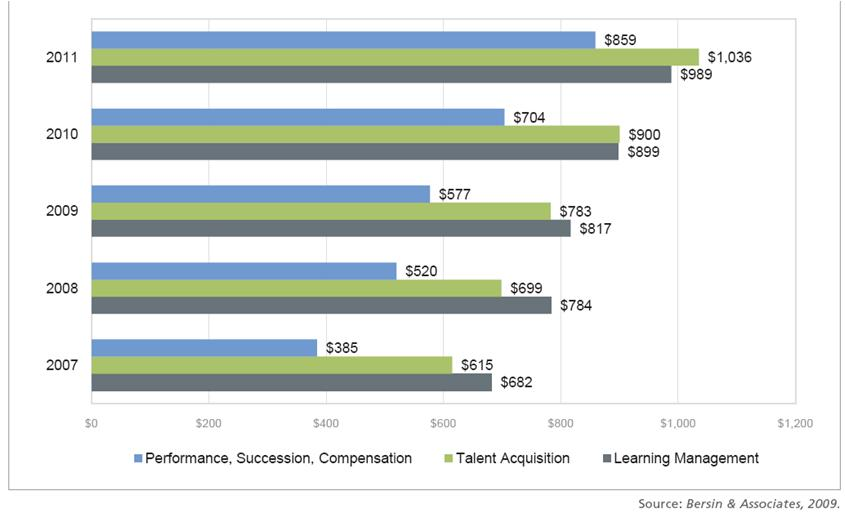

- performance management
- goal management
- compensation management
- talent acquisition / recruiting
- Learning management systems
- career development
- succession planning

The role of talent acquisition and performance management has increased many folds compared to learning management systems in the talent management market. Many companies which were earlier working on only one of these domains have moved to developing integrated talent management systems.

== Delivery methods ==
Many organizations struggle with HR data silos, disconnected technologies, and manual processes, the future of talent management is embodied in solutions designed from the ground up to provide business-centric functionality on a unified talent management platform. Talent management system recently have been at the forefront of growth in the software as a service (SaaS) delivery market following earlier iterations in the standard HR systems space via application service provider (ASP) delivery models. Traditional delivery via on-premises license sales still exist, but are much less prevalent in the competitive space.

== Enterprise systems integration ==
Vendors of TMS software (Levensaler & Laurano 2009) typically claim varying degrees of integration with other enterprise software vendors, and in particular with leading vendors of HRMS systems. The accuracy of these claims is often a question of interpretation, as the degree to which each vendor integrates with 3rd party systems varies considerably depending on circumstances and both the vendor and the third party solution. In some cases, third party vendors offer certification for such scenarios, in order to offer some basis of comparison.

== Competitive market ==
The so-called war for talent has driven a marked increase of attention and investment in the talent management space as new vendors continue to enter to support an ever-growing demand for strategic human resources applications. Many of these competitors have entered via the software as a service (SaaS) delivery model, affording small and medium businesses (SMB) new less-costly options. The Gartner Magic Quadrants for Talent Management Suites compares the major players of this market each year; in 2018 ranking products included Cornerstone OnDemand, SAP's SuccessFactors, and Skillsoft's SumTotal systems. In 2019, Gartner retired the talent management quadrant and made talent management functionality a factor in its HCM Magic Quadrant. The 2020 and 2021 leaders included ADP, Ceridian, Kronos (UKG), Oracle, and Talentsoft.

== See also ==
- Human resources information systems
- Human resource management system
- List of talent management software companies
