= SumTotal Systems =

American technology company

SumTotal Systems, Inc.
- Trade name: SumTotal; Sumtotal Systems LLC
- Industry: Software
- Predecessors: Asymetrix; Docent Software
- Founded: 1985 (as Asymetrix); 1997 (as Docent Software); 2003 (as SumTotal Systems)
- Headquarters: Gainesville, Florida, U.S.
- Key people: Ronald Hovsepian (CEO); Jeffrey Laborde (CFO)
- Owner: Vista Equity Partners (2009–14); Skillsoft (2014-22); Cornerstone OnDemand (2022–present)
- Website: www.sumtotalsystems.com

SumTotal Systems, Inc. is a software company based in Gainesville, Florida, that provides human resource management software and services to private and public sector organizations. The company uses multiple cloud-based channels, including software as a service (SaaS), hosted subscription, and premises-based licensure.

In September 2014, it was acquired by SkillSoft, a provider of online learning to corporate training organizations. In June 2022, SkillSoft announced its intention to sell the company for approximately $200 million.

On August 25, 2022, Cornerstone OnDemand, Inc. announced that it had completed the acquisition of SumTotal.

== History ==
=== 1984-1997: Asymetrix ===
Asymetrix Learning Systems, based in Bellevue, Washington, was founded in 1984 by Paul Allen and funded through his Vulcan Ventures. Asymetrix then spent around ten years developing software for online education. Among the first products from this development period were ToolBook, Asymetrix Librarian, and the e-Learning Network – an early software as a service product. Additionally, an early three-dimensional rendering system Asymetrix 3D F/X was released in 1994 and later renamed Web3d. Asymetrix also produced a variety of screen savers for a short period and developed Compel (a graphical presentation and prototyping program).

The company was recapitalized in 1995 with more funding from Allen. In October 1996, SoftBank invested about $3.8 million in Asymetrix. In September 1997, Asymetrix acquired Aimtech for about $3.1 million in stock. In October 1996, the company spun off its client/server tools into a newly created wholly owned subsidiary, ASX Corporation, which was renamed ConQuer Data, Inc. It was later renamed Infomodelers, which was then sold to Allen. In September 1997 Asymetrix acquired Oakes Interactive Incorporated, Acorn Associates Incorporated and TopShelf Multimedia for approximately $2.1 million. In the first half of 1998, it acquired New York-based Meliora Systems and Illinois-based Strategic Systems Associates. In 1998 Asymetrix went public. The June initial public offering (IPO) raised approximately $31 million. After the IPO, Allen controlled about 45% of the shares. Asymetrix was listed on the Nasdaq exchange with the ticker symbol ASYM, with a lukewarm market reception. In September 1999 Asymetrix issued $10 million in preferred stock to Vulcan and Marshall Capital.

In October 1999 Asymetrix's name was changed to click2learn.com, when James A. Billmaier was its chief executive. Between 1995 and 1999, like many companies in the dot-com bubble, Click2learn reported growing revenues but continued operational losses. Kevin M. Oakes took over as chief executive in January 2000. In early 2000, the company spun off its graphics and rendering software as InfoModelers, which was acquired by Visio Corporation. Other noteworthy acquisitions included the May 2001 purchase of IntelliPrep Technologies, Incorporated and Meliora who made Ingenium. As products were consolidated into their Aspen Enterprise Productivity Suite, losses continued through 2002, resulting in operational cost control measures including reductions in workforce. In 2003 click2learn (formerly Asymetrix) and Docent Software announced their intention to merge.

=== 1997–2002: Docent Software ===
Docent Software was founded in 1997 and based in Mountain View, California. David Mandelkern and Pardner Wynn founded the company, with Wynn as chief executive and Mandelkern as chief technology officer The company developed business-oriented training software. Pardner and Cynthia Wynn (then married) had developed Stanford Testing Systems in 1994, doing business as TestPrep, which was incorporated into Docent software holdings. Docent was funded by venture capital in six rounds from investors such as Norwest Venture Partners, Advanced Technology Ventures, and Invesco. It had operating losses for 1997, 1998, and 1999. David R. Ellett replaced Wynn as chief executive in July 1998 on the cusp of the dot-com bubble. In 2000 Docent filed for an initial public offering (IPO) and went public on NASDAQ on September 29, raising approximately $85 million. Docent acquired gForce Systems in October 2001 for $5.3 million, which included about $4.7 million in debts and liabilities. R. Andrew Eckert joined as president in December 2001 and ultimately replaced Ellett as CEO in April 2002. After growing to over 200 employees at the time of the IPO, by 2002 the company had reduced its staff by 20% to cut costs.

=== 2003–2004: SumTotal Systems ===
In 2003, when click2learn (formerly Asymetrix) and Docent announced their intention to merge, click2learn's shareholders received slightly more than half of the stock in the merged company - former shareholders in click2learn owned about 52% and Docent about 48% of the shares. At the time of the merger, click2learn employed over 300 people, 100 of which were in Hyderabad, India, and Docent employed an additional 170. The combined company became Hockey Merger Corporation in February 2004 while a new name was planned. On March 18, 2004, the new name SumTotal Systems was announced for the combined company, with headquarters in Gainesville, Florida. The merger was completed in 2004. Shares in the new company were listed on the Nasdaq exchange with the symbol "SUMT" (previous symbols were CLKS and DCNT).

=== 2005–2017: Acquisitions ===
In October 2005, SumTotal acquired Pathlore, a mid-market learning management systems company with a focus in state and local government and healthcare. A year later, in November 2006, the company acquired the privately owned software company MindSolve Technologies, founded in 1994, for about $12 million. Mindsolve focused on performance management software.

In May 2009 Vista Equity Partners, the largest software-only private equity fund, agreed to acquire SumTotal for $160 million and closed the transaction in July 2009.

On January 5, 2011, GeoLearning was acquired by SumTotal. In July of that year, two companies were acquired, CyberShift, a Parsippany, New Jersey, software company focused on SaaS multitenancy workforce management and expense software, and Accero, an enterprise payroll and benefits software provider.

In August 2014, Skillsoft Limited, a computer-learning software and content provider, announced that its subsidiary, Skillsoft Corporation, had entered into an agreement to acquire SumTotal Systems, LLC from affiliates of US-based private equity firm Vista Equity Partners. In September 2014, SumTotal was acquired by SkillSoft.

== Technology and services ==
Services include learning management, workforce management, talent management, HR, planning, analytics, payroll and benefits. The company delivers its software as a service (SaaS) using cloud computing, and in some cases premises-based licensure. The company has regional offices in the United States, Canada and outside of North America including Europe and APAC.

== See also ==
- List of talent management system companies
- Green Park Business Park
- History of virtual learning environments
- List of learning management systems
- Software industry in Telangana
