= List of talent management system companies =

The following is a list of notable companies associated with talent management systems (TMS).

== TMS companies ==
Company	Status	Revenues ($mns)	Location	Notes
Cornerstone onDemand	Acquired by Clearlake Capital	$103.87	Santa Monica, CA	
Halogen Software	Acquired by Saba Software	$65.7	Ottawa, Canada	TSX: HGN, 2015 revenue
iCIMS (ATS Only)		$25.6	Holmdel, NJ	Privately held.
Kenexa (ATS Only)	Acquired by IBM	$196.3	Wayne, PA	NASDAQ: KNXA. 2010 revenue
Sumtotal Systems	Acquired by Cornerstone OnDemand	$200.0	Gainesville, FL	Owned by Vista Equity. Est revenue
Taleo Corporation (ATS Only)	Acquired by Oracle	$237.3	Dublin, CA	NASDAQ: TLEO, 2010 revenue

== Other companies that produce TMS ==
Company	Location	Notes
Lawson Software	Minneapolis, Minnesota	Owned by Infor Global Solutions. Primarily a producer of ERP Software.
Oracle Corporation	Santa Clara, California	Oracle has talent management in its Fusion and PeopleSoft software
SAP AG	Walldorf, Germany	Announced acquisition of SuccessFactors on December 3, 2011. SAP is primarily a producer of ERP Software
