= MindLeaders =

MindLeaders was an e-learning and organizational development company with a global headquarters in Dublin, Ireland and offices in the UK, US, South Africa and Australia which has been described by Bersin as a "global e-learning player" along with Skillsoft and Element K (which was acquired by Skillsoft in 2011). The company had a content library (about 4,000 courses in total), mainly in the business skills and IT professional area but also for social care, hospitality and more general compliance training in the UK. These courses were typically accessed through one of two learning management system (LMS) platforms owned by the company. Whilst not a widely known brand, MindLeaders content was resold by consumer-facing channel partners including learndirect, Monster.com and Cornerstone OnDemand.

In September 2012, Skillsoft acquired MindLeaders, bringing together the two companies in the learning field. Skillsoft offered targeted learning assets that cover key business issues such as leadership development, IT certification support and talent management, as well as compliance needs including legal, food services and ES&H, hospitality and adult social care compliance needs.

== History ==
MindLeaders was founded in 1981 by Carol Clark and Fran Papalios. In 2007, MindLeaders was bought by ThirdForce plc, an elearning company headquartered in Dublin, Ireland and founded by current chairman and CEO, Brendan O'Sullivan. ThirdForce was an acquisition-based business which bought elearning companies Electric Paper and AV Edge in 2003 and Creative Learning Media in 2005. The merged company was known as MindLeaders ThirdForce. In October 2011, MindLeaders ThirdForce announced that from January 2012 it would be known as MindLeaders.

On September 10, 2012, SSI Investments II Limited, the parent company of Skillsoft Limited, announced its intention to acquire MindLeaders. The closing of the acquisition was announced on September 25.
