= Adam Miller (businessman) =

American entrepreneur

- Education: Wharton School, Bachelor of Science; University of Pennsylvania Bachelor of Arts; UCLA School of Law, JD; UCLA Anderson School of Management, MBA
- Occupations: Businessman; investor; philanthropist
- Political party: Democrat Party
- Spouse: Staci Miller

Adam Miller is an American tech entrepreneur and philanthropist best known as the founder of education software company Cornerstone OnDemand. He's also the founder of the Los Angeles-based homelessness non-profit Better Angels, and is active with a variety of non-profit and philanthropic initiatives. In 2026, he ran as a candidate for the 2026 Los Angeles mayoral election, where he lives.

== Early life and education ==
Miller was born in New York. He grew up in the Flanders section of Mount Olive Township, New Jersey. He earned a Bachelor of Science degree from the Wharton School, and a Bachelor of Arts degree from the University of Pennsylvania. He later attended UCLA School of Law, earning a JD, and also earned an MBA from UCLA Anderson School of Management. He also became a certified public accountant. After graduating, Miller took a two-year trip around the world.

== Business career ==
When Miller returned from his trip, he worked as an investment banker, a consultant, and in a boutique law firm.

=== Cornerstone OnDemand ===
In 1999, Miller and two cofounders launched Cornerstone OnDemand, a cloud-based development software provider and learning technology company. Miller served as CEO from 1999 to 2020. The company went public in 2011. By 2021, the company had approximately 2,700 employees and 75 million subscribers. The company was acquired in 2021 by private equity firm Clearlake Capital for $5.2 billion.

=== Better Angels ===
Better Angels is an umbrella for several of Miller's initiatives to help the homeless in Los Angeles. After noticing several homeless encampments, Miller developed the idea of Better Angels with his wife, Staci. They studied homelessness in Los Angeles and other cities, to understand why the money being spent wasn't working. They decided to self-fund their prevention program and construct affordable housing projects, without relying on government funding. As of December 2025, the nonprofit had 30 employees, 1,000 volunteers and a $300 million investment fund. As of 2026, it was developing two privately financed affordable housing projects: a 51-unit property in South Los Angeles, and a 72-unit modular development in Westchester, near Los Angeles International Airport. “What we’re trying to do is prove . . . that the private sector can make money in the affordable housing arena,” Miller says.

Better Angels also conducts outreach programs in LA County to help homeless people access services, and develops mobile apps to help case managers get people off the streets.

=== Other work ===
After leaving Cornerstone, Miller founded Instil, a relationship management platform for non-profits, and the corporate giving platform Groundswell. Instil develops software to help non-profits operate better. The company develops software to help non-profits operate better. He founded LA-tech.org, a nonprofit coalition of LA’s top tech companies formed to expand opportunities for underserved communities in Los Angeles. The company finds tech company internships for LA students of color, and as of May 2026, the organization had filled 2,000 internships. Miller also served as Chairman of El Segundo, CA-based disaster response organization Team Rubicon. He merged the two nonprofits, Food Allergy & Anaphylaxis Network and the Food Allergy Initiative, into Food Allergy Research & Education (FARE), one of the largest nonprofits focused on food allergies. He sits on FARE's board of directors. He is also managing director for Allerfund, reportedly the first fund focusing on food allergy companies.

== Political activity ==
Miller is a lifelong Democrat. In 2026, he announced he was running for Mayor of Los Angeles, as a centrist. His platform included finding more efficient and cost effective ways to bring services to residents, including eliminating overlapping services. Miller finished in fourth place, and incumbent Karen Bass and her opponent Nithya Raman advanced to the November election.

== Personal life ==
Miller is married to wife Staci, and has with three children. They live in Los Angeles.

== Philanthropy ==
Miller founded 1P Foundation (short for One Planet) with his wife, Staci as chief executive. 1P is a philanthropic foundation that conducts research, advocacy and social impact investing, with a stated focus on homelessness, education, gun safety, climate change and social entrepreneurship. Miller also founded the Short-Term Eviction Prevention Fund, to provide non-punitive micro loans to reduce homelessness. The latter initiative operates as part of Better Angels.
