= Report card =

Document of student performance in school

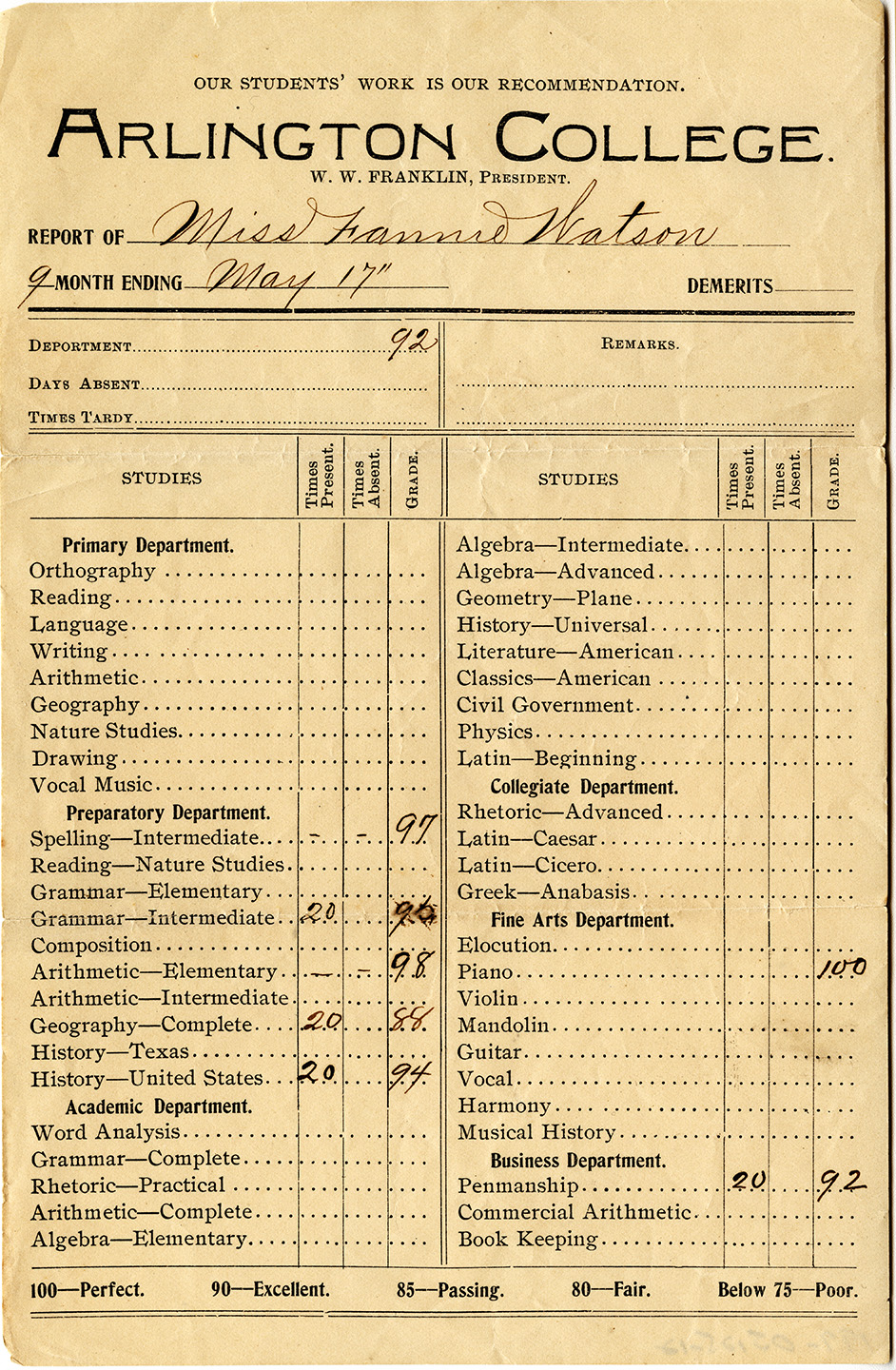
Progress report from Arlington College, c. 1897-1899

A report card, or just report in British English – sometimes called a progress report or achievement report – communicates a student's performance academically. In most places, the report card is issued by the school to the student or the student's parents once to four times yearly. A typical report card uses a grading scale to determine the quality of a student's school work. Report cards are now frequently issued in automated form by computers and may also be mailed. Traditional school report cards contained a section for teachers to record individual comments about the student's work and behavior. Some automated card systems provide for teachers' including such comments, but others limit the report card to grades only.

The term "report card" is used to describe any systematic listing and evaluation of something for information. For example, many states in the United States have their education departments issue report cards on schools' performance. Political advocacy groups will often issue "report cards" on legislators, "grading" them based on their stances on issues.

== Report cards by geographic area ==
=== Serbia ===
In Serbia the role of report cards is widely fulfilled by svedočanstva ("testimonies"), in which all final (annual) grades throughout the entire level of education, as well as any negative or positive critique the student is given, and all of his other school institution-related accomplishments are kept.

=== United States ===
In some elementary schools, students typically receive three to four report cards. The academic year is separated into three terms (Sept–Dec, Dec–Mar, Mar–June) and at the end of each term the student will get a report card. It is often followed by a break of some sort. For example; First term Christmas Holidays, second term March break and third term Summer Holidays. Some school districts may administer report cards on a quarterly basis, usually after each nine week term.

In some secondary schools, students receive two report cards, one at the end of each grading period. They also get mid-term report cards midway through the grading period. For example; a semester goes from September to January and January to June. This would not count for summer school. Some school districts may administer the report card on a trimester or quarterly schedule as well.

Additionally, in the United States, progress reports may be issued to track a student's performance in between report cards. They are typically issued at the midpoint of a grading period, (for example: 4½ weeks into a nine-week grading period, or three weeks into a six-week grading period) and contain virtually the same information as the report card. These reports allow students and their parents to see if school performance is slipping and if intervention is required to bring up the grade.

=== United Kingdom ===
English secondary schools would traditionally issue a written report, no more regularly than once a year. This is changing, however, with many schools now publishing reports similar to a grade report. Pupils at key stage 3 are typically awarded a national curriculum level (up to 8th grade), while GCSE students will be awarded a grade (from A* to G, or U- from 9 to 1 with the new grading system). In 2010 the Government agency for ICT in education, BECTA, put in place a requirement for school report cards for all pupils in the comprehensive school system to have their reports made available to parents online (see also electronic grade book).

=== Ontario, Canada ===
An Ontario secondary school report card

In Ontario, provincially standardized report cards are issued at the end of each term. In elementary schools (grades 1–8), two separate report cards are used: The Elementary Progress Report, used between October 20 and November 20 of the school year, and the Elementary Provincial Report Card, used at the end of Term 1 (sent home between January 20 and February 20 of the academic year) and at the end of Term 2 (sent home toward the end of June of the school year).

Kindergarten report cards are also provincially standardized as of the 2016–2017 school year. These are strictly comment-based report cards and are issued on the same schedule that the grade 1–8 report cards are issued.

As of 2018, only the public and Catholic school boards in Ontario are required to use the provincial report cards. Many private schools choose to use the provincial report card to maintain the standards set by Ontario's Ministry of Education.

The report cards for grades 1–6 use a common template. The first quarter of page 1 shows the student's information. The bottom 3/4 of the first page includes the Learning Skills descriptors regarding the student's behaviour, teacher comments on the learning skills and overall level for each skill (marked on a scale of E (Excellent), G (Good), S (Satisfactory), or N (Needs Improvement)). The learning skill categories are Organization, Collaboration, Initiative, Independent Work, Self-Regulation, and Responsibility. Pages 2 and 3 contain all of the core subjects. Ontario's education includes seven mandatory subjects: English, Second Language (French or Native), Mathematics, Science and Technology, Social Studies, Health and Physical Education and The Arts. English, French, Mathematics and Art are further divided into Reading, Writing, Oral Communication and Media Literacy for English, Listening, Speaking, Reading and Writing for Second Language, Number Sense and Numeration, Measurement, Geometry and Spatial Sense, Patterning and Algebra and Data Management and Probability for Mathematics, and Music, Visual Arts and Drama, and Dance for The Arts. Subject specific comments appear beside the marks for each subject. Page 4 details the marking scale used on the report card, with spaces for Parent Comments and Signatures and for students to plan goals for the future. Possible marks include R (remediation required), I (insufficient evidence) D−, D, D+, C−, C, C+, B−, B, B+, A−, A, and A+. 'A' marks mean the student is exceeding the provincial standard, 'B' marks mean that they are meeting the provincial standard, 'C' marks mean that the student is approaching the provincial standard and D marks mean that the student falls below the provincial standard.

The grade 7 and 8 template has a few differences from the 1–6 report card. This report card displays the median for the subject/strand/course. Social Studies is also divided into History and Geography. The 7 and 8 report card offers percentage marks instead of letter grades. These marks are still viewed as equivalent letters as detailed in the above grade 1–6 information.

== Check system ==
In many elementary schools in North America, a "Check System" is used in the primary grades (kindergarten to third grade) in place of letter grades. Teachers give a Check for at the given grade's level, Check Plus for advanced, and Check Minus for below the given grade's level.

A similar system is used for informal, low-stakes grading in US colleges, particularly in the humanities, and especially for short writing samples, such as reaction papers or in-class writing. This serves as an alternative to a numerical or letter grade. Here a check means "acceptable" or "at the expected level", check plus means "better than expected", "good" or "outstanding", and check minus means "below expectations", "unacceptable" or "bad". The system may also be supplemented by a 0 (zero) for "not done" or "not applicable". The system is informal, and has variations – the work may not count for the final grade or may count for a small amount. If so, the plus/check/minus may or may not be different in value, with any form of check simply counting as participation.

== Etymology ==
Due to their status as significant documents in many formal education systems, many early grade reports were printed on cardboard, card-stock paper, or other heavy paper-based materials that were heavier, more durable, and less bendable than standard-weight paper. Many formal education systems also standardize the dimensions of their grades reports to be as long and wide as large index cards. Because of these card-like qualities, the creators and receivers of such print-based grade reports have historically called them "report cards."

Although the dimensions, weight, and pliability of report cards change depending on their education systems, many institutions and districts now print grades reports/report cards on standard 8.5"x11" copy/printer paper.

In the U.K., report cards were cards which misbehaving students were required to carry with them to each class, at the end of which the teacher would enter a failing or passing grade in conduct for that class. Usually the student was required to carry the card for a week and finish the week with no failing grades in order to be relieved of having to present the card for the following week. In the United States, these were called "conduct cards" in many schools.

== See also ==
- Personal development planning
- Grade book
