= Foradian =

Foradian Technologies
- Type: Privately held company
- Industry: Educational technology, Education
- Founded: 2009
- Founders: Unni Koroth, Arvind G S, Abdulla Hisham, Vishwajith A, Abdul Salam, Arun Raveendran
- Headquarters: Bangalore, India
- Products: Fedena, Uzity, Fluxday

Foradian Technologies is a privately held software provider of ERP Solutions for education institutions. Foradian is based in Bangalore (Bengaluru), Karnataka, India.

Fedena is an open source school management software developed by the company, used in over 100 countries. A notable implementation of Fedena is its use in over 15,000 schools in the state of Kerala, India. The Education Department of the Government of Kerala has used Fedena in a state program named Sampoorna to automate the system and process of over 15,000 schools in the state. Uzity is a virtual learning environment and course management system developed by Foradian that assists teachers and students to collaborate and learn the contents of different courses.

Foradian gained media attention for creating a digital font for the Indian rupee sign and for popularizing the Tintumon character online. The rupee font release was covered by major Indian media outlets.

== History ==
Foradian Technologies was founded in 2009 as a web design firm by six co-founders from Kerala and Karnataka states in India.

== Products ==
=== Fedena ===
Fedena is an open source school management software based on Ruby on Rails framework. It was selected for a presentation at International Rubyconf held at Bangalore in March 2010. Fedena is also presented in the Debconf 2010. Fedena v3.5 was released on 15 February 2016, and Fedena is available in 22 languages, including English. Foradian Technologies also provide Fedena related services, Fedena – PRO and Fedena Enterprise.

=== Uzity ===
Uzity serves as a virtual learning environment and repository for course information (course management system) within an educational institution. Developed by the same team that developed Fedena, it is a collaboration platform for students, teachers, administrators and management.

== Rupee Foradian font ==
As soon as the new Indian Rupee sign was approved, Foradian technologies published a free digital font named "Rupee Foradian" on 16 July 2010. The font was created using vector image and mapped to the grave accent key (`) on keyboards. The font gained widespread attention online following its release. The grave accent key of the keyboard was chosen because the grave accent key is often not used by computer users. The font received some criticism for the mapping to the grave accent key, and per being released much ahead of its approval for unicode. The Rupee sign may be made visible on some word-processors also where the font is not installed in the system, by choosing to embed the font in the document in file saving options. However, embedding the Foradian Rupee Font renders the document read-only, i.e., the document cannot be edited on a system where the font is not installed.

== Recognition ==
For the development and support of Fedena, Foradian won the MIT TR35 2012 India award for innovation in education domain. Foradian also came fifteenth in the Deloitte Technology Fast50. Foradian received the IT Innovation Award – MSME Category at the Express I.T Awards, 2014.
