= Jasig =

- Founded: late 1999
- Founder: Carl Jacobson, David Koehler, Bernie Gleason, Ted Dodds, Art Pasquinelli
- Type: 501(c)(3)
- Purpose: Open source software for higher education
- Location: Westminster, Colorado
- Method: Apache License
- Website: jasig.org

Jasig is a non-profit US organization founded by a group of university IT personnel in late 1999 with the stated goal of creating open source computer programs for use in higher education environments, mostly written in the Java programming language. Jasig, “a federation of higher ed institutions interested in open source”, is registered as a US 501(c)(3) non-profit organization. The name Jasig is an acronym for Java in Administration Special Interest Group. The founders of Jasig included Carl Jacobson from University of Delaware, David Koehler from Princeton, Bernie Gleason from Boston College, Ted Dodds at the University of British Columbia, Jeffrey Gozdieski and Art Pasquinelli from Sun Microsystems.

Jasig developed uPortal, a portal framework for higher education; Bedework, an enterprise calendar system; CAS, an authentication system and single sign-on service; and “2-3-98” to help raise awareness and adoption of open-source.

== Licensing policy ==
All the software sponsored by Jasig is open source, released under the Apache license.

== Community model ==
Jasig utilizes a community model based on three classes of membership:

- institutional members
- partners
- affiliates

Each type of membership assumes a different role in the organization. Institutional members tend to be colleges or universities that use Jasig commissioned software. Partners tend to be commercial entities who have some vested interest in Jasig software. Affiliates are similar to partners, but have a lower level of commitment to the organization.

== Partners ==
Jasig has worked with a variety of commercial entities in the development and support of its various technologies and software.

- Unicon:
  - Offers an Open Source Cooperative Support Program for Central Authentication Service (CAS).
  - Unicon is a Jasig contributor and offers services for uPortal in the areas of deployment, customization, integration, and general support for education organizations.

== Software projects ==
Jasig sponsors four main software projects, and one community project:

- uMobile: delivers educational content to mobile devices.
- uPortal: an enterprise portal framework.
- CAS (Central Authentication Service): allows students and faculty to sign into multiple websites with a single sign on.
- Bedework: a calendaring system.
- The 2-3-98 Project: a community project that assists college faculty and staff in moving proprietary systems to open source alternatives.

== Funding ==
Jasig's primary means of funding are through membership fees, sponsorships, and donations. The organization also relies on volunteers to assist in other non-monetary ways such as writing computer programs, writing documentation etc.

== Activities ==
Jasig holds an annual conference spotlighting open source in education. This annual event often coincides with other conferences dedicated to the development and adoption of not only open source applications, but technology generally.

== Merger with Sakai Foundation ==
Logo of Apereo Foundation

In 2010, Jasig entered into talks with the Sakai Foundation to merge the two organizations. The two organizations were consolidated as Apereo Foundation in December 2012.
