= Mississippi Community College Board =

The Mississippi Community College Board (MCCB), formerly the Mississippi State Board for Community and Junior Colleges (SBCJC), is a statutory coordinating board tasked with oversight of the public community and junior colleges of the state of Mississippi.

== Institutions ==
Board members are appointed for staggered terms by the Governor of Mississippi to oversee 15 schools.

- Coahoma Community College
- Copiah-Lincoln Community College
- East Central Community College
- East Mississippi Community College
- Hinds Community College
- Holmes Community College
- Itawamba Community College
- Jones County Junior College
- Meridian Community College
- Mississippi Delta Community College
- Mississippi Gulf Coast Community College
- Northeast Mississippi Community College
- Northwest Mississippi Community College
- Pearl River Community College
- Southwest Mississippi Community College

Each of the institutions offers dual enrollment and dual credit courses in conjunction with local high schools, adult education programs that lead to a High School Equivalency credential, career and technical programs of study that are designed to prepare students for immediate entry to the local workforce, university transfer programs that prepare students for transfer success at four-year institutions of higher learning, and non-credit programs focused on specific workforce-related needs identified in each community where a community college is located. Many institutions also offer opportunities for interested individuals to take advantage of continuing and community education courses created to teach specific and interesting topics in a non-credit environment. Additionally, students have access to the Mississippi Virtual Community College, which enables students to take courses, via distance learning, at any of the 15 community colleges and receive support from a nearby college.

== History ==
The Legislature created the board in 1986 to receive and distribute funds from the state, federal government, and other sources to the community and junior colleges. The initiation of the SBCJC can be traced back to the 1920s. Senate Bill 131, Laws of 1928, approved April 26, 1928, authorized the establishment of junior colleges, and also created a State Commission for oversight of these institutions. The first action of the Commission consisted of identifying its authority, establishing standards by which existing junior colleges must meet to qualify for state aid and develop criteria required of agricultural high schools seeking junior college status. This action of the Commission constituted the birth of Mississippi State System of Public Junior Colleges, giving Mississippi the distinction of having the first state system of comprehensive two-year colleges in the nation. The Commission had no staff but was served by personnel within the State Department of Education. In 1968, a separate operational division for junior colleges was created in the State Department of Education, which provided state services and oversight until 1986.

== Virtual Community College ==
The Mississippi Virtual Community College (MSVCC) is a consortium of the 15 physical community colleges in the Mississippi system that allows students to take classes over the Internet from any community college located in the state. After almost three years of research and planning, MSVCC was inaugurated in January 2000 under the MCCB Distance Learning program, and currently serves over 20,000 students each semester.

As an example of how the consortium works, a student from Northwest College (acting as host college) can take a class on the Internet offered from Pearl River Community College (acting as provider college). The host college supports the student with any other needed resources-—including academic advising, financial aid, and campus network access—and the course credit from the provided class is subsequently awarded through the host college. Through this mechanism, the virtual community college provides an opportunity for students take classes that are not offered at their "home" college. Additional learning support is provided by the Mississippi Electronic Libraries Online (MELO), a shared resource hosted by the MCCB that is made available to students and instructors through their respective campus networks and administered under the Distance Learning program.

The mission of the Mississippi Virtual Community College is to provide educational opportunities to constituencies who live within the various community and junior college districts in Mississippi and to others beyond those boundaries. The mission includes providing access to instructional offerings through advanced technologies for those individuals who currently cannot take advantage of the offerings of the community college through traditional means and to those individuals who are seeking alternative educational delivery systems.

The MSVCC maintains an articulation agreement amongst all of its constituent community colleges that is explicitly designed to avoid drawing any distinction between online and traditional lecture courses in order to facilitate a unified curriculum system-wide. Accreditation of the MSVCC is maintained under the oversight of the Southern Association of Colleges and Schools.

== Divisions ==
The State Board was formerly made up of 11 members.

=== Services ===
In 1995, the SBCJC adopted the accreditation standards as set forth by the Southern Association of Colleges and Schools. The board uses these standards for quality, accountability, and financial adequacy.

=== Adult Education and HSE ===
The Mississippi Community College Board participates in the administering of the Adult Education Program. This program is beneficial to adults because it allows them the opportunity to take a second chance at earning an education. To be competitive in today's society, one must possess basic competencies in areas such as math, reading, writing, communication, teamwork, and computer technology. The Adult Education Program offers assistance to adults in need of gaining these skills. In addition, the program provides students with sufficient basic education to enable them to benefit from job training and to retain productive employment so they might more fully enjoy the benefits and responsibilities of citizenship. Further, the Adult Education program affords many the satisfaction of achieving, at the least, a credential associated with completing secondary education.

=== Athletics and Activities ===
All fifteen of the Mississippi Community Colleges have athletics and are affiliated with the Mississippi Association of Community Colleges Conference (MACCC). The MACCC is part of the National Junior College Athletic Association. Region XXIII comprises the MACCC as well as the MISS-LOU Junior College Conference, which are only schools in Louisiana. Aside from sports, many schools have bands, choirs, cheerleading, dance teams, and a wide variety of clubs and groups, which are designed to build community, teach leadership, and prepare graduates for success after college.

=== Career and Technical Education ===
The Career and Technical Education division is responsible for working with community college administrators to assist with evaluation of programs, the reimbursement process for upgrading equipment, and salaries for Career-Technical personnel. In addition, the CTE Division reviews institutional requests for instructional programs to be added, modified, or deleted. The division also serves as liaison between community college administrators, the Mississippi Department of Education, and the Research and Curriculum Unit of Mississippi State University.

The Career and Technical Education division works with each community college to ensure that curricula and courses are adequate for the various career and technical programs offered. There are currently 97 programs of study available to the students enrolled in Mississippi Community Colleges. This board ensures that college personnel are informed of the various governing policies and program requirements. Additionally, the Career and Technical Education division assists community college personnel in developing and reviewing personnel qualifications and credentials associated with career and technical instruction.

=== Distance Education ===
Distance learning responsibilities of the SBCJC include coordination of the Mississippi Virtual Community College and online course offerings for workforce training. The Mississippi Virtual Community College (MSVCC) is a consortium of 15 of Mississippi's community colleges. Through the MSVCC, students may take courses from community colleges anywhere in Mississippi while getting support services from a local college. Also, an active partnership with Mindleaders opens the door to skills training courses in information technology, management, and other valuable areas at an affordable cost in support of workforce training initiatives.

The fifteen members of the Mississippi Virtual Community College include: Coahoma Community College, Copiah-Lincoln Community College, East Central Community College, East Mississippi Community College, Hinds Community College, Holmes Community College, Itawamba Community College, Jones College, Meridian Community College, Mississippi Gulf Coast Community College, Mississippi Delta Community College, Northeast Community College, Northwest Mississippi Community College, Pearl River Community College, and Southwest Mississippi Community College. Each of the 15 member schools employs a staff member who handles local MSVCC operations. Personnel on each campus serve as local support for students who are enrolled in MSVCC classes.

=== Information Services ===
The information service division is responsible for identifying implementing technology initiatives within the agency as it responds "to the changing needs of the community and the citizens of Mississippi". Their services provide information to all of the community colleges in the state of Mississippi. This team constitutes the agency's leadership for suggesting, requesting, and implementing technological needs as it strives to fulfill its mission. The information service consists of training and support services, network management, and application development. Ray A. Smith is the director of information services.

=== Workforce Education ===
The Workforce Education Division is responsible for facilitating the Boards' goals of using state resources to provide workforce education to the citizens of Mississippi giving them the skills needed to be more productive and have an improved quality of life, and to provide the employers of our state a better trained and educated workforce.

== Statistics ==
In state fiscal 2008, there were 71,490 full-time equivalent students and 93,978 non-duplicate total credit: 63.9% female, 55.2% white, and 97.1% in-state.

| Institution | Enrollment | Academic | Technical | Career |
|---|---|---|---|---|
| Coahoma | 2,144 | 69.4% | 15.6% | 15.0% |
| Copiah-Lincoln | 3,161 | 73.1% | 19.2% | 7.7% |
| East Central | 2,228 | 68.9% | 28.8% | 5.3% |
| East MS | 4,010 | 81.0% | 15.5% | 3.5% |
| Hinds | 9,828 | 67.4% | 24.4% | 8.3% |
| Holmes | 5,108 | 75.2% | 22.1% | 2.7% |
| Itawamba | 5,864 | 76.4% | 21.9% | 1.8% |
| Jones | 4,559 | 76.0% | 19.3% | 4.6% |
| Meridian | 3,536 | 69.3% | 24.7% | 6.0% |
| MS Delta | 2,888 | 76.2% | 17.1% | 6.6% |
| MS Gulf Coast | 8,858 | 69.1% | 24.5% | 6.5% |
| Northeast | 3,342 | 67.4% | 28.5% | 4.2% |
| Northwest | 6,436 | 79.6% | 16.4% | 4.0% |
| Pearl River | 3,917 | 76.5% | 20.0% | 3.5% |
| Southwest | 1,843 | 65.6% | 24.6% | 9.8% |
| TOTALS | 67,719 | 72.9% | 21.6% | 5.6% |
