= Kadenze =

Online arts education technology company

Kadenze, Inc.
- Website type: Online education, learning management system
- Website: www.kadenze.com
- Commercial: Yes
- Registration: Required
- Launched: June 2015
- Current status: Active

Kadenze, Inc. is an American company that provides Massive Open Online Courses (MOOC). The company specifically focuses on courses related to art, music, and creative technology.

== History ==
The company was founded by Ajay Kapur in 2015. It hosts online courses produced in partnership with universities and other organizations.

On November 19, 2015, Kadenze launched Kannu, a learning management system geared toward creative education, music, arts, and design.

Kadenze had 10,000 students as of 2016.

Kadenze has partnered with universities and arts organizations in the United States and internationally. Its early partners included Princeton University, Stanford University, the California Institute of the Arts, and other art and design institutions. The platform's institutional partnerships have included courses developed by academic institutions and arts organizations, while industrial partners have provided software, course materials, and other resources for learners.
