= Kannu (learning management system) =

Learning management system

Kannu is a learning management system, purpose-built for creative education in music, arts, and design. It was released by California-based company Kadenze, Inc. ("Kadenze") in 2014 after the success of its MOOC platform, which Kannu is modeled after.

== History ==
Kadenze first released Kannu in November of 2014. Some early adopters of the customized platform were California Institute of the Arts, Otis College of Art and Design, Goldsmiths College, and Stanford University. After rounds of user testing and improvement it officially launched in 2015.

== Functionality ==
Kannu offers the usual features included in an LMS, such as course authoring, gradebooks, and attendance sheets. Some of its special features include modular course materials and custom branding, as well as forums for students. Per its origin as an arts LMS, it has a submission gallery, robust media embedding, and a portfolio system for students to share work publicly.

Kannu is a software as a service, i.e. cloud-based and scalable, rather than installed on a local network. As a newer product, it adheres to most modern web standards and practices, making it responsive to both computers and mobile devices.
