= Microlecture =

Short-form instructional content

A microlecture is a type of short-form instructional content for online and mobile learning, typically 60 seconds to three minutes long. These lectures are combined with specific activities designed to promote the epistemic engagement of the learner.

When used in flipped classrooms, which aim to reduce in-class lectures, microlectures are often tailored to student progress based on the results of quizzes or other formative assessments.

According to Matt Crosslin, an instructor at the University of Texas Rio Grande Valley, microlectures follow a constructivist approach. David Penrose, an instructional designer and eLearning consultant at San Juan College, has articulated the process for creating microlectures.

The interest surrounding the use of microlectures has grown outside of the United States to places like Hong Kong University, Yantai Nanshai University, Liaoning Police Academy, and East China Normal University. In the United States, the use of microlectures is considered a part of the Pandemic Response Plans. Even scholars at schools like Princeton University, UNC's School of Government, Humboldt State University, the University of West Florida, and University of Illinois Urbana-Champaign support the importance of an innovative teaching-learning approach for learners in the 21st century.

The response of the higher education community is mostly positive, but some is not.

== See also ==
- Instructional design
- Microcontent
- Microlearning
- Online learning
