= Charles Severance (computer scientist) =

American computer scientist and academic

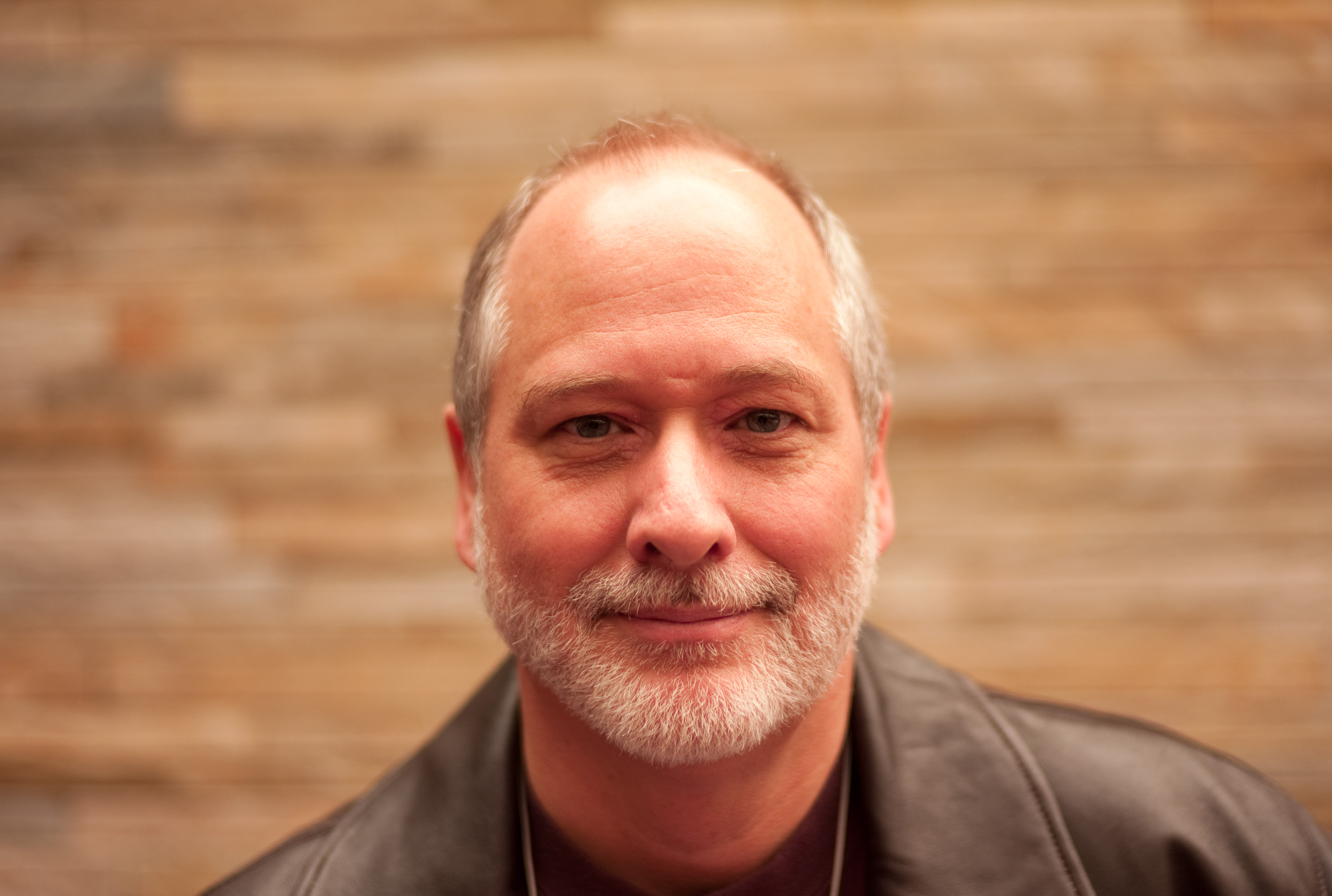
- Education: Michigan State University
- Known for: Sakai Project
- Scientific career
- Fields: High-performance computing
- Workplaces: University of Michigan; Sakai Project; Blackboard Inc.
- Website: www.dr-chuck.com

Charles Russell Severance, popularly known as Dr. Chuck, is an American computer scientist and academic who currently serves as Clinical Associate Professor of Information at the University of Michigan. He teaches multiple programming courses such as Python for Everybody (PY4E), Web Applications for Everybody (WA4E), etc. and even books of these free courses.

Severance studied at Michigan State University, gaining his BS in 1984, his MS in 1990, and his PhD in 1996, all in computer science. After graduation, he became an Adjunct Assistant Professor at Michigan State, also serving as director of the Division of Engineering Computer Services. He left this role in 1999 to become associate director for Advanced Technology at the University of Michigan's Media Union, and left the institution entirely in 2001 to serve as director of Product Development for Strategic Interactive. In August 2002, he returned to the University of Michigan as the first Chief Architect of the Sakai Project, later becoming a member of the Sakai Foundation Board of Directors, and then its first executive director.

In 2007, he resigned from his position as the executive director of the Sakai Foundation, becoming Clinical Associate Professor of Information at the University of Michigan. In 2012, he was hired by Blackboard Inc. to lead their initiatives involving Sakai projects. He announced his departure from this role in March 2014.

Outside of teaching and the private sector, Severance helped write the POSIX P1003 standard and has hosted several television shows, including Nothin but Net and Internet:TCI.

Severance has created a number of popular computer science and programming courses and specializations on Coursera. His courses are amongst the all-time top enrolled courses on the platform.

== Books ==
- Severance, Charles; Dowd, K. (1998). High Performance Computing. O'Reilly Media. ISBN 156592312X.
- Severance, Charles (2009). Using Google App Engine. O'Reilly Media. ISBN 9780596800697.
- Severance, Charles (2011). Sakai: Free As in Freedom (Alpha): A Retrospective Diary. CreateSpace. ISBN 978-1461166290.
- Severance, Charles; Fontichiaro, Kristin. (2013). Raspberry Pi. Cherry Lake Publishing. ISBN 978-1624311390.
- Severance, Charles. Python for Informatics: Exploring Information.
