= Learn.com =

American software company

Learn.com Inc.
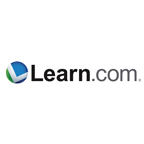
- Type: Private
- Industry: Computer Software
- Founded: 1999; 27 years ago
- Defunct: October 2010; 16 years ago
- Headquarters: Sunrise, Florida, U.S.
- Key people: Jim Riley (CEO); JW Ray (COO); Don Cook (CMO); Gene Gainey (CSO); Bob Colletti (CFO); Ted Schneider (CTO)
- Products: Business software

Learn.com Inc. was a software company headquartered in Sunrise, Florida. Learn.com provided on-demand learning management, talent management software, and e-learning courses.

== History ==
Learn.com was founded by Jim Riley and Patrick Toomey in January 1999 as a website that allowed anyone to create and publish e-learning courses or e-learning sites called LearnCenters. Learn.com became an early example of a website containing open content.

In September 2000, Learn.com introduced the first commercial version of its LearnCenter LMS, with the assistance of co-founder JW Ray.

In June 2001, Learn.com client ECOT became the first electronic charter school in the nation to graduate students.

In September 2002, Learn.com acquired Learn2 Corporation, a provider of e-learning content.

In June 2004, Learn.com acquired Mentor Communications, Inc.

In December 2005, Learn.com introduced LearnCenter X, the HCM industry's first integrated Talent management suite.

In September 2007, Learn.com introduced its WebRoom web conferencing product.

In June 2009, Learn.com introduced its Learn.com Personal Edition (LPE), a website that allows anyone to take courses and learn/improve skills or create and publish their own courses.

In October 2010, Learn.com was acquired by Taleo Corporation (NASDAQ: TLEO), a leader in the on-demand Talent Management market. In April 2012, Taleo was in turn acquired by Oracle Corporation and Learn.com technology became the foundation for the Oracle Learn Cloud product.

== Awards ==
In November 2009, Elearning! Magazine announced that Learn.com won the newly created Best Talent Management System (TMS) category. Learn.com also won top honors for its Learning Management System (LMS) in this readers' choice award. The company continued the trend of Best Enterprise LMS recognition for a record fourth year in a row, having won top honors in 2006 from Training Magazine.

In January 2008, Elearning! Magazine announced that their readers had voted the Learn.com LearnCenter platform as the Best LMS for 2007. Elearning! Magazine voters also gave top honors to Learn.com's Information Technology (IT) and Soft Skills content libraries. Learn.com LearnCenter was voted one of the Best Enterprise LMS for 2007 and 2008.

== See also ==
- Human Capital Management
- Learning Management System
- Performance Management
