= Halogen Software =

Canadian software company

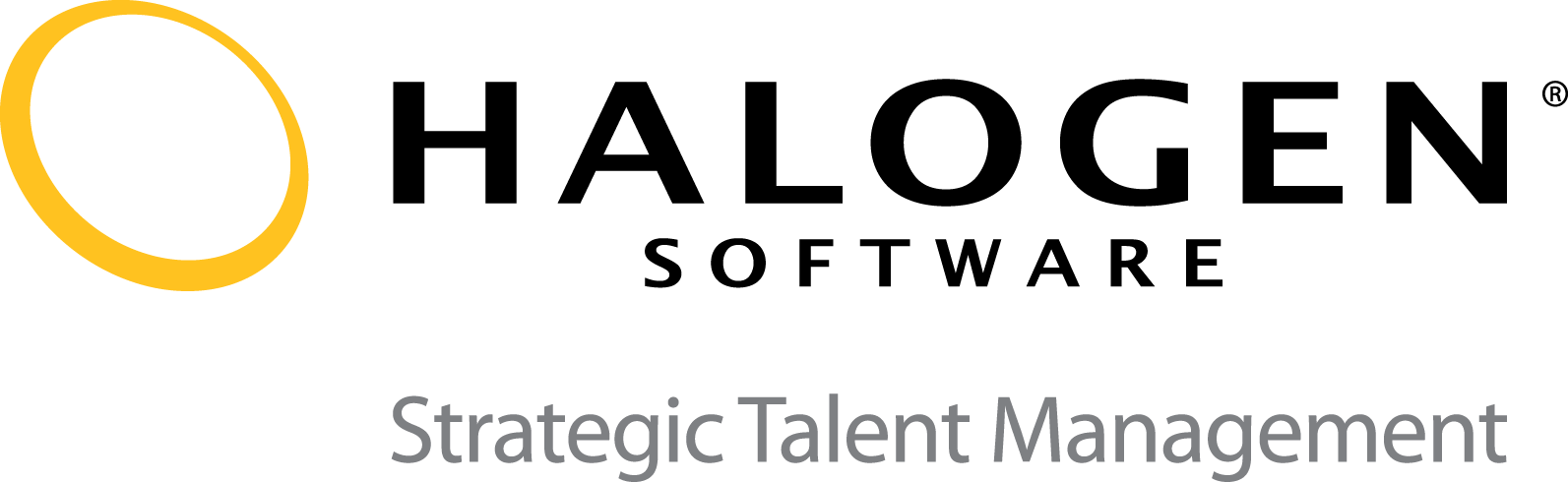
- Type: Subsidiary
- Founded: 1996; 30 years ago
- Founder: Michael Slaunwhite
- Headquarters: Ottawa, Ontario, Canada
- Key people: Les Rechan (CEO and president); Michael Slaunwhite (co-founder and executive chairman)
- Products: HR Management Software
- Number of employees: 475+
- Parent: Saba Software Inc.
- Website: www.halogensoftware.com

Halogen Software was a Canadian company that provided cloud-based talent management solutions to customers with between 100 and 10,000 employees. The firm was founded in 1996 and was headquartered in Ottawa, Ontario, Canada.

== History ==
The firm was formerly known as Manta Corporation and in June 2001, changed its name to Halogen Software Inc. Halogen Software has been backed by JMI Equity since 2008.

Paul Loucks was President and CEO from 2000 until July 2015. During that timeframe, Halogen grew from 25 employees to over 500 and built a client based on over 2,000 companies. Halogen opened an office in the United Kingdom in September 2011 and created its first Australian office in 2012. Between 2013 and 2015, it opened new offices in San Jose, North Carolina, Amsterdam and Dubai.

In May 2013, Halogen Software debuted in the Toronto Stock Exchange under the ticker symbol HGN. The company stock jumped to 17 percent on its first day. In September 2013, Halogen Software launched two software modules to implement one-on-one sessions between managers and employees in the workforce and improve employee communication by incorporating the Myers–Briggs Type Indicator.

Les Rechan became Halogen Software’s new President and CEO in 2015 after serving as interim CEO and on Halogen’s board of directors from May 2015.

In May 2017, Halogen Software was acquired by Saba Software for $293 million.

== See also ==
- List of talent management system companies
