= Growth Engineering =

Growth Engineering is a SAAS learning technologies company. They provide a platform for e-Learning, also known as a learning management system. Established in 2004, Growth Engineering offers a learning portal for companies and their employees, partners and customers. Growth Engineering is compatible with SCORM 1.2, SCORM 2004 and xAPI. In a Technavio report, Growth Engineering were recognised as a vendor in the game-based learning market.

== History ==
Growth Engineering was founded in 2004 by Juliette Denny. She founded the company as a consultancy targeted at new businesses in need of sales management training. Then, Growth Engineering released the Academy LMS. An online learning portal for businesses to train employees. The product focused on using gamification to engage learners. In 2016 Growth Engineering was listed on the Mishcon Leap 100. In 2015 Growth Engineering was named as the best LMS provider by e-Learning 24/7, and in 2016 they were named as the number one NextGen LMS and the best LMS for gamification by Learning 24/7.

== Products ==
Growth Engineering have three products: the Academy LMS, <knowledge Arcade mobile learning platform and Genie Game Based Authoring tool:

- The Academy LMS is a subscription based learning management system. Its key features include: a content library, a social feed, gamification and online classrooms.
- The knowledge Arcade, is used for front line staff, and provides learning assets, social feeds, peer to peer battles, squad battles and clubs live functionality.
- Genie is a game-based authoring tool.
