= Microcontent =

Website content providing a clear overview

There are at least two interpretations of the term microcontent. Usability adviser Jakob Nielsen originally referred to microcontent as small groups of words that can be skimmed by a person to get a clear idea of the content of a Web page. He included article headlines, page titles, subject lines and e-mail headings. Such phrases also may be taken out of context and displayed on a directory, search result page, bookmark list, etc. The second use of the term extends it to other small information chunks that can stand alone or be used in a variety of contexts, including instant messages, blog posts, RSS feeds, and abstracts.

== Original meaning ==
The original meaning of microcontent is by usability adviser Jakob Nielsen, who in a 1998 article referred to Microcontent as short content, like headlines, which need to be immediately clear and inviting to a reader, and which still make sense when removed from their original context. For instance, on a search engine result page, the article headline may be displayed with only a short snippet but not the full article. "Microcontent should be an ultra-short abstract of its associated macrocontent," Nielsen said. He discourages traditional newspaper headline techniques, such as puns, teasers and other wordplay, which are more effective when the full story is already visible. He views the first word or two of each headline as extremely important to readers scanning a page.

== Other meanings ==
The second meaning of the term has been defined by blogger Anil Dash in 2002:

"Today, microcontent is being used as a more general term indicating content that conveys one primary idea or concept, is accessible through a single definitive URL or permalink, and is appropriately written and formatted for presentation in email clients, web browsers, or on handheld devices as needed. A day's weather forcast [sic], the arrival and departure times for an airplane flight, an abstract from a long publication, or a single instant message can all be examples of microcontent."

In the years of the booming blogosphere the term became important and useful to describe the emerging new content structures that were enabled by new technologies (like trackbacks, pings and increasingly RSS), new types of CMS-software and -interfaces (like blogs and wikis), and not least by new socio-cultural practices (people creating, bringing into circulation and re-using/re-mixing microchunks of content).

Microcontent could be other forms of media like an image, audio, video, a URL (hyperlink), Metadata like author, title, etc., the subject line of an email, an item in an RSS feed. In 1998, Jakob Nielsen offered tips on how to write usable microcontent.

== See also ==
- Microformats
- Microlearning
- Microlecture
- Web 2.0
