= Taleo =

Former American software company

Taleo Corporation
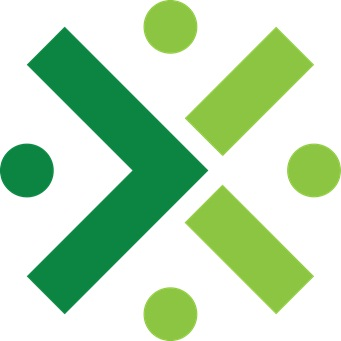
- Type: Subsidiary
- Industry: Software
- Founded: 1996; 30 years ago in Quebec City, Canada
- Defunct: February 9, 2012; 14 years ago
- Successor: Oracle
- Headquarters: Dublin, California, U.S.
- Key people: Michael Gregoire (chairman and CEO); Neil Hudspith (Chief Customer Officer); Jason Blessing (EVP Products & Technology); Heidi Melin (Chief Marketing Officer); Doug Jeffries (CFO)
- Products: Human-resources software
- Website: www.taleo.com

Taleo Corporation was a publicly traded database vendor based in Dublin, California, which was acquired by Oracle in 2012. Taleo's product offerings primarily focus on talent acquisition (recruitment), performance management, learning and development, and compensation management. These capabilities combine to provide what Taleo calls "Talent Intelligence" — an enhanced level of insight into candidates and employees. Taleo sells its Human resource management system (HRMS / HRIS) products entirely via a software-as-a-service (SaaS) model, in which all software and information resides in data centers operated and secured by Taleo.

On February 9, 2012, Oracle Corporation acquired Taleo Corporation for $1.9 billion.

Oracle Corporation continues to use the Taleo software name for its talent-management software suite. As of December 2013, Taleo software had over 20 million users.

== History ==
Taleo has its roots in Canada, where in 1996 Martin Ouellet established Viasite, a French-language job-board for candidates and employers. Ouellet and Louis Têtu soon began working with Fortune 500 companies interested in developing online approaches to recruiting that incorporated the efficiencies of supply-chain management processes.

Viasite was later renamed Recruitsoft, Inc. In 1999, Recruitsoft registered as a Delaware corporation with headquarters in San Francisco, California, and launched Recruiter WebTop, an online hiring management system. Global expansion followed, and by 2001 the company had secured customer relationships with large enterprises including Hewlett Packard, Dow Chemical, Agilent, Hasbro, American Airlines, United Airlines, Deloitte&Touche, Bombardier Aerospace and Transportation, MetLife, Cabletron Systems, and Sutter Health.

Recruitsoft, Inc. changed its name to Taleo Corporation in March 2004. As the talent-management market matured, Taleo added products and capabilities, integrating recruiting with performance management in 2008, adding compensation management in 2009, and including learning and talent development in 2010. As of 2010, Taleo made solutions available in 187 countries and in 31 languages.

In August 2011, Taleo reported it had more than 5,000 customers ranging from small and medium-sized businesses (SMBs) to large global enterprises, including nearly half of the Fortune 100.

=== R&D ===
Taleo operated R&D facilities in Quebec City, Canada; Kraków, Poland; and Jacksonville, Fla., with additional development staff in its Dublin, Calif., headquarters and other locations. Taleo's fiscal 2010 R&D investment was approximately $41 million. Jason Blessing was Taleo's Executive Vice President of Products & Technology.

=== Acquisitions ===
In addition to its own R&D efforts, Taleo expanded its product offerings through the acquisition of third-party solutions, talent and intellectual property:

- October 2003, White Amber
  - added contingent workforce management to the Taleo Enterprise platform
- April 2005, Recruitforce.com
  - became the foundation of Taleo Business Edition
- March 2007, JOBFlash
  - integrated IVR, interview, scheduling, and high-volume hourly hiring capabilities into Taleo Enterprise; created a complementary offering to Taleo Business Edition
- July 2007, WetFeet Inc.
  - сustomers of WetFeet Recruiter applicant tracking system transitioned to Taleo Enterprise and to Taleo Business Edition
- July 2008, Vurv Technology
  - broadened Taleo's unified talent-management and Applicant tracking system (ATS) capabilities
- January 2010, Worldwide Compensation
  - compensation management software, consulting services and domain expertise
- September 2010, Learn.com
  - SaaS Learning Management System and industry expertise in corporate learning
- April 2011, Cytiva
  - customers of Cytiva recruiting management solution transitioned to Taleo Recruit™ for SMBs or to Taleo Recruiting™ for enterprises
- July 2011, Jobpartners
  - customers of Jobpartners' talent-management solution transitioned to Taleo Business Edition or to Taleo Enterprise

== Products and services ==
Taleo Corp marketed Talent Management platforms for SMBs (as Taleo Business Edition) and enterprises (as Taleo Enterprise). Both Taleo Business Edition and Taleo Enterprise were modular offerings that allowed customers to add capabilities as they required them.

Taleo Corp operated a professional services organization that performed integration, implementation and performance optimization services worldwide.

== See also ==
- Oracle Advertising and Customer Experience (CX)
- List of acquisitions by Oracle
- List of talent management system companies
