= Open edX =

Educational support software

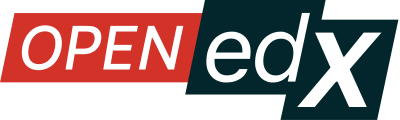
- Logo
- Screenshot
- Website type: Online education
- Available in: Multilingual (14)
- Creators: Piotr Mitros, edX, CRL/Axim
- Website: www.openedx.org
- Commercial: No
- Launched: January 2012; 14 years ago
- Current status: Active

The Open edX platform is the open-source software, originally developed by Piotr Mitros, whose development led to the creation of the edX organization. On June 1, 2013, edX open sourced the platform, naming it Open edX to distinguish it from the organization itself. The source code can be found on GitHub. Maintenance was transferred to edX, an MIT/Harvard education initiative, in 2012.

When edX was acquired in 2021 by 2U, the Open edX team and maintenance were transferred to the Center for Reimagining Learning (tCRIL), a nonprofit founded by Harvard and MIT with the proceeds from the acquisition. In 2023, the nonprofit was renamed the Axim Collaborative.

== Uses ==
Open edX was designed for the MITx project, which was renamed to the edX project and made into a separate 501(c)3 after Harvard joined. This remains the largest global installation as of 2022, with over 3000 courses and 500,000 regular users. The Open edX community maintains a catalog of other installations, including fully-hosted learning sites open to public courses and 350 other instances run by organizations of all sizes.

== Software ==
Version	Date	Version	Date
Initial	2013-06-01	Aspen	2014-10-28
Birch	2015-02-24	Cypress	2015-08-13
Dogwood	2016-02-11	Eucalyptus	2016-08-26
Ficus	2017-02-23	Ginkgo	2017-08-14
Hawthorn	2018-08-07	Ironwood	2019-03-22
Juniper	2020-06-09	Koa	2020-12-09
Lilac	2021-06-09	Maple	2021-12-20
Nutmeg	2022-04-12	Olive	2022-10-11
Palm	2023-06-14	Quince	2023-12-11
Redwood	2024-06-09	Sumac	2024-12-17
Teak	2025-06-26	Ulmo	2026-01-15

The Open edX server-side software is based on Python, with Django as the web application framework.

== Community ==
Platform design and development have been co-designed with its community from early in the project's history. The community maintains several working groups focused on marketing, build-test-release cycles, translation, data design, front-end design, and code deprecation.

The community hosts an annual Open edX Conference, which rotates worldwide each year. In 2022 it was held in Portugal.
