= Claroline =

E-learning- and e-working-platform

- Original author: UCLouvain
- Developer: Claroline
- Stable release: 13.1.3 / December 22, 2021; 4 years ago
- Written in: PHP
- Operating system: Windows, macOS, Linux
- Available in: 35 languages
- Type: LMS
- License: GNU GPL
- Website: claroline.com
- Repository: github.com/claroline/Claroline

Claroline is an open-source collaborative eLearning and eWorking platform, (learning management system) operating under the GPL open-source license. It enables organizations to develop and manage courses and collaboration spaces online. Used extensively in educational institutions and by enterprises for data sharing, it boasts availability in around 100 countries and supports 35 languages

== Tools ==
The Claroline platform is organized around the concept of spaces associated with courses or pedagogical activities. Each course space provides a list of tools enabling the teacher to:

- Write a course description
- Publish documents in any format (text, PDF, HTML, video, etc...)
- Administer public or private forums
- Create learning paths (compatible with SCORM)
- Create groups of users
- Compose exercises (compatible with IMS / QTI standard 2)
- Structure an agenda with tasks and deadlines
- Post notifications (also by email)
- Propose home work and mark online
- View statistics of attendance and completion exercises
- Use the wiki to write collaborative documents

== Development ==
The Claroline programme was initiated by the University of Louvain in Louvain-la-Neuve, Belgium, at the end of the 1990s. Since 2000, Claroline development teams have been focusing on code stability and the development of features in line with users' needs. The main concern of the developers is not to build up a large number of new features, but to concentrate on a few elaborated tools concerning the pedagogical approach and the interface offered to the users. A large worldwide community of users and developers also extensively contributes to Claroline's development and diffusion.

== Annual Conference of Claroline Users (ACCU) ==
To promote the use of Claroline and encourage the relationship between contributors, each year, the Claroline community meets at the Annual Conference of Claroline Users (ACCU). The ACCU is a unique opportunity to meet users and developers of many countries to share experiences and accomplishment. The first ACCU was organized on May 22 and 23, 2006 in Louvain-la-Neuve (Belgium). It was also held in other cities such as Vigo (Spain), Lyon (France) and Saidia (Morocco).

== Unesco honours Claroline ==
The Claroline project is the winner of the 2007 UNESCO – King Hamad Bin Isa Al-Khalifa Prize for the Use of ICT in Education. The Claroline project was chosen out of 68 projects from 51 countries.

== Claroline Connect ==
In addition to the developments related to the maintenance and evolution of the current version of the platform, development teams are working on a new version of Claroline.

Remaining true to the principles of simplicity, flexibility and stability that characterize Claroline, a new version known as code name Claroline Connect will be introduced. This will offer many new features while maintaining some general guidelines such as the following:

- User orientation
- Custom profiles
- Independent learning
- Resources modularity and openness to the environment and to changes in the web
- Genericity and variety of learning tools and collaborative work
- Freedom of configuration

== Partners ==
Developed since 2000 by UCLouvain (University of Louvain, Belgium), Claroline has been developed following teacher's pedagogical experience and needs. Claroline is now financially supported by the Walloon Region for its development through the WIST programme.

Within this programme, Claroline associates three Belgian partners :

- IPM, a pedagogy and multimedia research institute at UCLouvain, Louvain-la-Neuve
- CERDECAM, the Research and Development Centre of the ECAM engineering school, based at UCLouvain Woluwe campus, Brussels
- LENTIC, research centre on new technologies, innovation and change of the University of Liège, in Liège

== Consortium Claroline ==
The Claroline Consortium was born on May 23, 2007, during the second annual conference of Claroline users that was held at the Vigo University, Spain. This non-profit international association mainly aims at federating the Claroline community, coordinating the platform’s development and promoting its use.

The 5 founding members of the Consortium are:

- UCLouvain, Belgium, presiding
- Haute École Léonard de Vinci, Belgium
- Universidade de Vigo, Spain
- Université du Québec à Rimouski, Canada
- Universidad Católica del Norte, Chile.
