= Sakai (software) =

Learning management system

Sakai Project
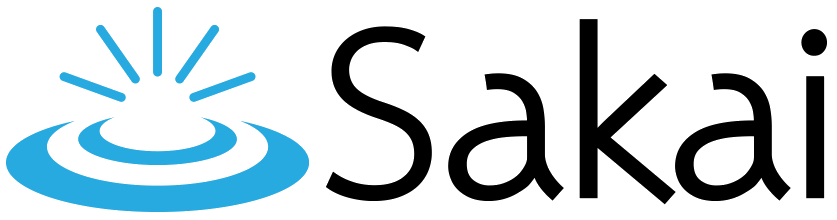
- Release: March 2005
- Stable release: 22.0 / April 13, 2022
- Written in: Java
- Operating system: Cross-platform
- Available in: 19 languages (ar, ca, de, en, es, eu, fr, it, ja, ko, mn, nl, pl, pt, ru, sv, tr, vi, zh),
- Type: Course Management System
- License: Educational Community License
- Website: www.sakailms.org
- Repository: github.com/sakaiproject/sakai

Sakai is a free, community-driven, open source educational software platform designed to support teaching, research and collaboration. Systems of this type are also known as learning management systems (LMS), course management systems (CMS), or virtual learning environments (VLE). Sakai is developed by a community of academic institutions, commercial organizations and individuals. It is distributed under the Educational Community License, a type of open source license.

Sakai is used by hundreds of institutions, mainly in the US, but also in Canada, Europe, Asia, Africa and Australia. Sakai was designed to be scalable, reliable, interoperable and extensible. Its largest installations handle over 100,000 users.

== Organization ==
Sakai is developed as open source software as a community effort, stewarded by the Apereo Foundation, a member-based, non-profit corporation. The Foundation fosters use and development of Sakai in the same open, community-based fashion in which it was created. It encourages community building between individuals, academic institutions, non-profits and commercial organizations and provides its members with an institutional framework for their projects. It works to promote the wider adoption of community-source and open standards approaches to software solutions within the education and research communities. It organizes the yearly Open Apereo Conference. Additional, regional conferences have taken place in China, Japan, Australia, Europe and South Africa, and there is an annual Sakai Virtual Conference. Members include universities, colleges, other institutions and commercial affiliates that provide support. While members take care of most of the development and support in practice, joining the Foundation is not required to use the software or participate in the community.

== History ==
The development of Sakai was originally funded by a grant from the Mellon Foundation as the Sakai Project. The early versions were based on existing tools created by the founding institutions, with the largest piece coming from the University of Michigan's CHEF course management system. Sakai is a play on the word chef and refers to Iron Chef Hiroyuki Sakai.

The original institutions started meeting in February 2004. Each institution had built a custom course management system:

- Indiana University: Oncourse, replaced by Canvas.
- Georgia Institute of Technology: T-Square, replaced by Canvas in 2018.
- Massachusetts Institute of Technology: Stellar, optional transition to Canvas in 2020.
- Stanford University: CourseWork, replaced by Canvas in 2015.
- University of Michigan: CTools, formerly CourseTools, based on the CHEF framework, replaced by Canvas in 2016.
- uPortal and the Open Knowledge Initiative were also represented.

Sakai 1.0 was released in 2005, and it was adopted by all participating universities. For instance, Indiana University moved all of its legacy systems to Sakai.

With the Sakai Project concluding, the Sakai Foundation was set up to oversee the continued work on Sakai. Sakai's chief architect, Dr. Charles Severance, was its first executive director.

Several large US universities joined, as well as universities, colleges, other institutions and commercial affiliates on all continents.

One of the partners, the University of Cambridge, started work on a more student-centric system in an attempt to provide a better fit with their own educational model. Several partners joined this effort, seeing this as an opportunity to do away with some of Sakai's known limitations; for a while, the effort was named Sakai 3, but it was far from being a feature complete replacement and it was built from scratch on different technology.

This seriously hampered progress on the existing Sakai. After about two years, it turned out the new software would never replace the existing Sakai, and it was renamed to Sakai OAE (today: Apereo OAE), while the existing Sakai was renamed to Sakai CLE.

After this, Sakai CLE development slowly picked up speed again. A major advance was a WYSIWYG content editing tool, and the Lessons tool, contributed by Rutgers University in version 2.9.3.

In 2012, University of Michigan and Indiana University, two of Sakai's founders, left the Sakai foundation. In the following 2 years, many existing users also retired Sakai, moving to other software, while other core contributors remained. During this period, new users were rare. However, Sakai CLE development picked up speed, and it was renamed back to just Sakai.

In December 2012, the Sakai Foundation merged with Jasig to form the Apereo Foundation, which took over stewardship of Sakai development.

Since then, new major releases have continued to appear almost yearly. The main focus of development has been on incrementally improving the existing toolset and modernizing the look and feel, making it more suitable for mobile use.

== Sakai collaboration and learning environment - software features ==
The Sakai software includes many of the features common to course management systems, including document distribution, a gradebook, discussion, live chat, assignment uploads, and online testing.

In addition to the course management features, Sakai is intended as a collaborative tool for research and group projects. To support this function, Sakai includes the ability to change the settings of all the tools based on roles, changing what the system permits different users to do with each tool. It also includes a wiki, mailing list distribution and archiving, and an RSS reader. The core tools can be augmented with tools designed for a particular application of Sakai. Examples might include sites for collaborative projects, teaching and portfolios.

In Sakai, the content and tools used in courses or projects is organized into sites. Typically, a site corresponds to a course or a project. Each site has its own content, tools, users and access rights for users, search tool, usage statistics, etcetera. In principle, everything in Sakai is done per site. This is what allows Sakai to scale to hundreds of thousands of users.

Sakai is extensible in several ways:

- it is a platform for integrating loosely coupled tools, which provide the actual functionality; in addition to the core tools distributed with Sakai, several important third-party tools are available, and web developers can write their own additional tools in a language of their own choice;
- third-party tools are available for playing SCORM packages;
- external web applications can be integrated using LTI

== Architecture and technical details ==
Sakai is a set of web applications written in Java-based, loosely coupled in a service-oriented architecture. The supported web server is Tomcat; the databases supported for data storage are Oracle and MySQL.

Sakai has a layered architecture:

- The Sakai kernel provides a common infrastructure and exposes it in the form of web services.
- All of the sub-applications, known as tools in Sakai, depend on these services for things like user management and site management. Nearly all functionality is implemented in the form of tools.
- Tools have a business logic implementation part and a user interface part, implemented using various Java technologies.
- These interfaces are combined by so-called aggregators.

Each layer is extensible: new services, tools, and aggregators are easy to add. Owing to the services, tools and user interfaces can be written in other languages than Java, but this does not happen in practice.

Up to and including Sakai 10, the code base for Sakai and its contributed tools were maintained in publicly accessible Subversion repositories. With Sakai 11, this was changed to Git and GitHub.

=== Releases ===
Sakai is mainly in use at universities. Major releases tend to be in spring or early summer, in order to allow institutions to upgrade before the new academic semester, and many of them do.

Branch	Original release date	Version	Version release date	Support Model
1.0.x	19 January 2004	1.0.0	27 October 2004	EOL (Maintained from XX to XX ?)
1.5.x	4 March 2005	1.5.1	27 May 2005	EOL (Maintained from XX to XX ?)
2.0.x	15 June 2005	2.0.1	15 August 2005	EOL (Maintained from XX to XX ?)
2.1.x	30 November 2005	2.1.2	12 April 2006	EOL (Maintained from November 2005 to November 2006 ?)
2.2.x	19 July 2006	2.2.3	12 February 2007	EOL (Maintained from July 2006 to May 2007 ?)
2.3.x	3 November 2006	2.3.2	21 May 2007	EOL (Maintained from November 2006 to March 2008 ?)
2.4.x	21 May 2007	2.4.1	21 September 2007	EOL (Maintained from May 2007 to July 2009)
2.5.x	20 March 2008	2.5.6	28 January 2010	EOL (Maintained from March 2008 to June 2010)
2.6.x	22 July 2009	2.6.3	26 August 2010	EOL (Maintained from July 2009 to April 2011)
2.7.x	11 June 2010	2.7.2	10 September 2011	EOL (Maintained from June 2010 to November 2012)
2.8.x	18 April 2011	2.8.3	15 February 2013	EOL (Maintained from April 2011 to June 2014)
2.9.x	9 November 2012	2.9.3	19 August 2013	EOL (Maintained from November 2012 to July 2016)
10.x	30 June 2014	10.7	19 April 2015	EOL (Maintained from June 2014 to March 2018)
11.x	23 July 2016	11.4	2 June 2017	EOL (Maintained from July 2016 to March 2019)
12.x	22 March 2018	12.6	1 March 2019	EOL (Maintained from March 2018 to April 2020)
19.x	21 March 2019	19.6	23 December 2020	EOL (Maintained from March 2019 to April 2021)
20.x	29 April 2020	20.6	5 August 2022	EOL (Maintained from April 2020 to April 2022)
21.x	18 March 2021	21.5	24 February 2023	EOL (Maintained from March 2021 to July 2023)
22.x	13 April 2022	22.5	21 June 2024	EOL (Maintained from April 2022 to ?)
23.x	14 July 2023	23.5	30 June 2026	Active (Maintained from July 2023 to ?)
25.x	6 July 2025	25.2	30 June 2026	Active (Maintained from July 2025 to ?)
Legend: Unsupported Supported Latest version

== See also ==
- Learning management system
- Virtual learning environment

== Bibliography ==
- Korcuska, Michael; Berg, Alan Mark (June 10, 2009). Sakai Courseware Management: The Official Guide (1st ed.). Packt Publishing. p. 504. ISBN 978-1-84719-940-9. Archived from the original on August 20, 2009.
- Berg, Alan; Dolphin, Ian (July 5, 2011). Sakai CLE Courseware Management: The Official Guide (1st ed.). Packt Publishing. p. 456. ISBN 978-1849515429.
- Severance, Charles Russell (November 24, 2013). Sakai: Building an Open Source Community (2nd ed.). CreateSpace Independent Publishing Platform. p. 235. ISBN 978-1494273675.
- Roldán Martínez, David; Mengod López, Raúl; Merino Echeverría, Daniel (2011). SAKAI. ADMINISTRACION, CONFIGURACION Y DESARROLLO DE APLICACIONES (1st ed.). Ra-Ma Editorial. p. 238. ISBN 978-84-9964-067-9.
