= Moodle =

E-learning platform

- Original author: Martin Dougiamas
- Developers: Martin Dougiamas; Moodle HQ; Moodle Community
- Release: 20 August 2002; 24 years ago
- Stable release: 5.3 / 5 October 2026; 0 days ago
- Written in: PHP
- Operating system: Unix, Linux, FreeBSD, Windows, MacOS and any other systems that support PHP and a database, including web host providers. An app is also available for end-users.
- Type: Course management system
- License: GPLv3+
- Website: moodle.org
- Repository: git.in.moodle.com/moodle/moodle

Moodle (/ˈmuːdəl/ MOO-dəl) is a free and open-source learning management system written in PHP and distributed under the GNU General Public License. Moodle is used for blended learning, distance education, flipped classroom and other online learning projects in schools, universities, workplaces and other sectors.

Moodle is used to create custom websites with online courses and allows for community-sourced plugins.

== Overview ==
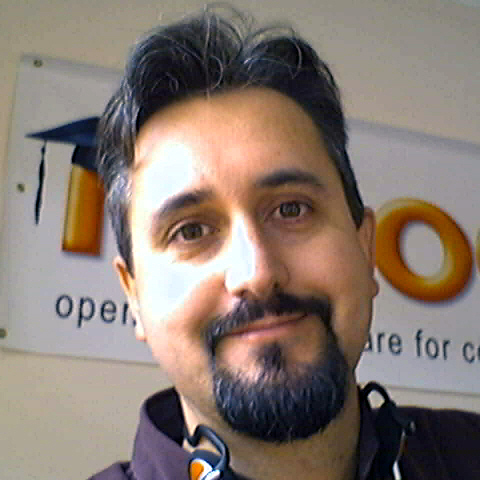
Moodle developer, Martin Dougiamas in 2007

Moodle was originally developed by Martin Dougiamas to help educators and scholars create online courses and focus on interaction and collaborative construction of content. The first version of Moodle was released on 20 August 2002 (24 years ago), and it continues to be actively developed.

The Moodle Project is led and coordinated by Moodle HQ, an Australian company, that is financially supported by a network of eighty Moodle Partner service companies worldwide. Development is also assisted by the open-source community.

Moodle is a learning platform used to augment and move existing learning environments online. As an E-learning tool, Moodle developed several features now considered standard for learning management systems, such as a calendar and gradebook.

Plugins, custom graphical themes, mobile responsive web design, and a Moodle mobile app are available to customise each individual's experience on the platform. Moodle's mobile app is available on Google Play and the App Store for iOS, but not on the F-Droid Android FLOSS repository.

== E-learning standards support ==
Moodle has adopted the following e-learning standards:

- The Sharable Content Object Reference Model (SCORM) is a collection of E-learning standards and specifications that define communications between client-side content and a server-side learning management system, as well as how externally authored content should be packaged to integrate with the LMS effectively. There are two versions: SCORM 1.2 and SCORM 2004. Moodle is SCORM 1.2 compliant and passes all the tests in the ADL Conformance test suite 1.2.7 for SCORM 1.2. SCORM 2004 is not supported in Moodle; however, Rustici Software has a Moodle plugin that turn any Moodle site into a fully compliant SCORM 2004 LMS.
- The AICC HACP standard for CMI was developed by the Aviation Industry Computer-Based Training Committee (AICC) and is used to call externally authored content and assessment packages. AICC content packages are supported in Moodle 2.1 – Moodle 4.2.
- IMS Common Cartridge packages can also be imported into Moodle. In addition, Moodle Book activities can be exported as IMS Content Packages.
- Learning Tools Interoperability (LTI) is a standard way of integrating rich learning applications, (often remotely hosted and provided through third-party services) with educational platforms. Moodle uses the External Tool activity to act as an "LTI consumer" as standard and will act as an "LTI provider" using a plugin.

== Deployment ==
Users can download and install Moodle on a Web server, such as the Apache HTTP Server, and a number of database management systems, such as MySQL, are supported. Pre-built combinations of Moodle with a Web server and database are available for Microsoft Windows and Mac. Other automated installation approaches exist, such as installing a Debian package, deploying a ready-to-use TurnKey Moodle appliance, using the Bitnami installer, or using a "one-click install" service such as Installatron.

Certified Moodle Partners provide other Moodle services, including hosting, training, customisation and content development. This network of providers supports the development of the Moodle project through royalties.

== Interoperability ==
Moodle runs without modification on Unix, Linux, FreeBSD, Windows, MacOS and any other systems that support PHP and a database, including web host providers.

Moodle also has import features for use with other specific systems, such as importing quizzes or entire courses from Blackboard or WebCT.

In March 2012 Blackboard acquired two companies based on Moodle's software including Baltimore-based Moodlerooms Inc. and NetSpot of Adelaide, Australia. In August 2015, Blackboard acquired Colombia-based Nivel7. The Red Hat site, Opensource.com, reported that Moodle will always be an open-source project, with clear delineation between Blackboard and Moodle.

== Background ==
=== Origins ===
Martin Dougiamas, who has graduate degrees in computer science and education, wrote the first version of Moodle. Dougiamas started a Ph.D. to examine "the use of open source software to support a social constructionist epistemology of teaching and learning within Internet-based communities of reflective inquiry." Although how exactly social constructivism makes Moodle different from other eLearning platforms is difficult to show, it has been cited as an important factor by Moodle adopters. Other Moodle adopters, such as the Open University in the UK, have pointed out that Learning Management Systems can equally be seen as "relatively pedagogy-neutral".

=== Pedagogical approach ===
The stated philosophy of Moodle includes a constructivist and social constructionist approach to education, emphasising that learners (and not just teachers) can contribute to the educational experience. Using these pedagogical principles, Moodle provides an environment for learning communities.

=== Origin of name ===
The acronym Moodle officially stands for modular object-oriented dynamic learning environment. When the project was first started, the "m" instead stood for "Martin's", after original developer Martin Dougiamas. Besides being an acronym, the name was also chosen because of the dictionary definition of Moodle, with connotations such as "tinkering", "insight", and "creativity", as well as to correspond to an available domain name.

== Development ==
Moodle has continued to evolve since 1999 (since 2001 with the current architecture). It has been translated into over 100 different languages and is accessible in many countries worldwide. Institutions can add as many Moodle servers as needed without having to pay license fees.

Key features

The MoodleMoot is a conference for Moodle community members to learn about Moodle, share experiences of the learning platform, discuss research in related educational technologies and contribute ideas to future Moodle development. Held around the world, MoodleMoots are organised by universities or other large organisations using Moodle, Moodle Partners, Moodle associations or Moodle HQ. 2020 saw the #Moot move to a virtual conference.

== Adoption ==
Moodle has over 50% market share in Europe, Latin America, and Oceania.

In the U.S. higher education market as of fall 2021, the top three learning management systems (LMS) by number of institutions were Canvas (30%), Moodle (21%), and Blackboard (20%). In 2013, Moodle was the second largest provider with 23% market share, following Blackboard (41%). By 2017, Moodle had dropped to the third largest provider, due in part to increased adoption of Instructure's semi-open source Canvas platform. In March 2016, Blackboard became an official Moodle partner; a partnership that ended in 2018.

In the UK, the Open University currently uses a Moodle installation for their 200,000 users while the government uses a Moodle installation for the Civil Service Learning platform serving half a million employees.

== See also ==
- Educational technology
- Student Information System
- Learning management system
- Online learning community
- List of learning management systems
- List of free and open-source software packages
