= Sampoorna =

School management system in Kerala, India

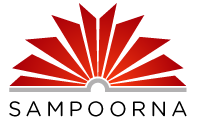
- Developer: KITE
- Release: 2010; 16 years ago
- Type: School Management System
- Website: http://sampoorna.kite.kerala.gov.in

Sampoorna is a school management system project implemented by the Education Department of Government of Kerala to automate the system and process of over 15,000 schools in the state. Sampoorna is implemented by KITE (previously IT@School Project) using the free and opensource school erp Fedena

The main objective of ‘Sampoorna’ school management software is to facilitate the Principals, Head Masters and teachers to easily implement, track and monitor all activities of students of their school and that of the school itself. Various cumbersome processes such as preparation of Transfer Certificate, copying of Admission Register, generating various reports related to students, parents, teachers and non-teaching staff, generating lists for various scholarships, preparation of SSLC examination database, progress report preparation, promotion list preparation, entry forms for sports and games and also for Kalotsavams etc. would be made easier using the online software. A timetable preparation software has also been integrated into the software.

== History ==
A unique application was launched by KITE (Then IT@school) Sampoorna, a school management system. It was built on Fedena's open source database and server software. This software was made to make the previously tiresome process hassle-free for Administrators.

In 2012 Headmasters were also given authority to update student details like Name, Date of birth and religion which was till then only authorized to DEO and AEO

In 2017 the government of Kerala made sampoorna mandatory for all schools including government, Aided, CBSE and ICSE schools in the state to utilise sampoorna to record student details from class 11 to 12
