= GlobalScholar =

- Type: Private
- Industry: education software
- Founded: December 2006; 19 years ago
- Founder: Kal Raman
- Headquarters: Bellevue, Washington (United States) Chennai, Tamil Nadu (India)
- Key people: Kal Raman (Chairman and CEO); Thomas Boysen (Chief Learning Officer)

GlobalScholar was an operating unit of Scantron based in Bellevue, Washington, that developed, manufactured, licensed, and supported a wide range of products and services related to education. This included products such as an enterprise resource planning (ERP) software, Pinnacle Suite, which supported all aspects of managing education at K-12 schools, including a gradebook, learning management system (LMS), and teacher development, analytics and online learning.

GlobalScholar.com was the company's on-demand collaboration platform for tutors, parents, and students. Parents and students could find pre-screened tutors on a variety of subjects and school levels, and pay for one-time homework help or engage in ongoing tutoring sessions. The sessions occurred on GlobalScholar's website, which provides an online whiteboard, audio/video IM, archiving, and billing.

GlobalScholar also operated two other websites, launched in January 2008. SchoolFinder pulled together relevant information for elementary and high schools and let parents compare one school against another. CollegeFinder did the same for colleges, pulling in rankings from U.S. News & World Report and The Princeton Review.

== History ==
GlobalScholar, formally known as InfiLearn, was founded in December 2006 by Kal Raman, a former drugstore.com chief executive and Amazon.com senior vice president.

GlobalScholar.com acquired Central Data Corporation's adaptable learning and educational scaffold assets along with the GlobalScholar name in 2007, using these as the baseline for the initial InfilLearn product. GlobalScholar.com made a strategic decision on January 31, 2008, to acquire Excelsior Software.

In October 2013, Scantron formally retired the GlobalScholar brand and stopped development and support on several products.

== Funding ==
The company secured $27 million in round B funding on January 31, 2008 from existing investors Ignition Partners and Knowledge Universe Education. This was on top of a previously undisclosed $15.5 Million of Round A funding the company raised early 2007. The funding included additional investments from Knowledge Universe Education, a leading global education company; Ignition Partners, a premier venture capital firm; and an added investment from Peter Neupert, an existing board member; Excelsior Software, with long-standing relationships in the education community, was also acquired.
