= Skillsoft =

Educational technology company

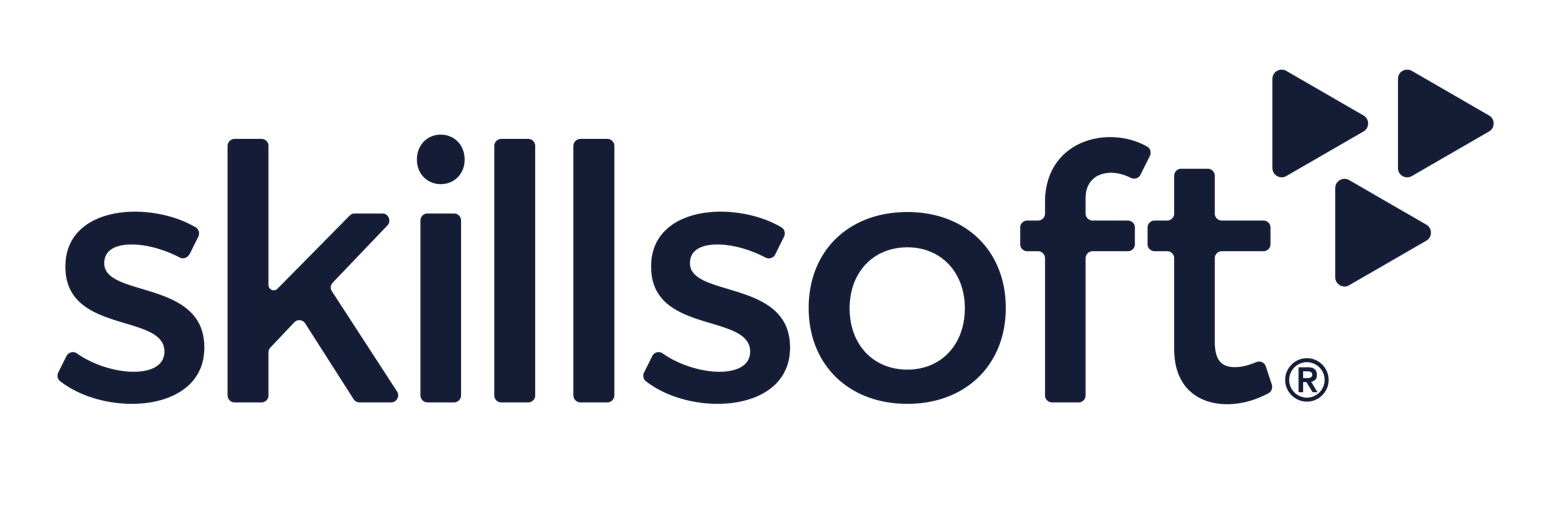
- Formerly: SmartForce
- Type: Public
- Traded as: Nasdaq: SKIL (Class A)
- Industry: Software as a service
- Founded: August 8, 1998
- Headquarters: 300 Innovative Way, Suite 201, Nashua, NH, United States
- Key people: Jeff Tarr (CEO/Director); Richard Walker (CFO); Mark Onisk (Chief Content Officer); Apratim Purakayastha (CTO)
- Products: Educational technology, learning management systems, training content
- Number of employees: 2,400 (2014)
- Subsidiaries: Codecademy
- Website: www.skillsoft.com

Skillsoft is an American educational technology company that produces learning management system software and content.

== History ==
Skillsoft was founded by Charles Moran in 1998. Moran was chief executive officer and president from 1998 to 2015.

Skillsoft had an IPO under the stock symbol SKIL in February 2000 and a SPO in July 2001. In June 2021, Skillsoft became a publicly traded company once again under the same stock symbol.

Skillsoft acquired Books24x7 in 2001. In 2002, Skillsoft merged with Dublin-based IT courseware company SmartForce (formerly CBT Systems), with the combined company retaining the Skillsoft name, establishing a common headquarters in Ireland. The company acquired NETg from Thomson Corporation in 2007.

In May 2010, the company was bought out for $1.2 billion by SSI Investments III Limited, a firm funded by Berkshire Partners, Advent International and Bain Capital. Skillsoft acquired Element K from NIIT in October 2011, and MindLeaders from ThirdForce Group in September 2012.

Skillsoft was sold by Berkshire Partners to Charterhouse Capital Partners for $2.0 billion on April 28, 2014. Later that year, Skillsoft acquired SumTotal Systems in September 2014. In May 2015, Skillsoft acquired Vodeclic SAS.

In September 2017, Skillsoft launched virtual coding practice lab CodeX, which provides coding exercises with embedded video content.

On June 14, 2020, Skillsoft voluntarily filed for Chapter 11 bankruptcy protection in the United States. On August 27, 2020, Skillsoft announced that it had emerged from bankruptcy. During the court-supervised process the company was able to reduce its debt by $1.5 billion US dollars.

In June 2021, Skillsoft was acquired by Churchill Capital. Churchill Capital then merged with Software Luxembourg, then acquired the Global Knowledge technical training platform. The combined company would be known as Skillsoft. Leadership coaching platform Pluma was also acquired that same year.

In December 2021, Skillsoft announced that it would acquire Codecademy, an online computer programming learning platform, for approximately $525 million in cash and stock. The sale was completed on April 5, 2022.

In 2022, Skillsoft sold SumTotal to Cornerstone on Demand for $200 million.

On May 20, 2026, Skillsoft entered into a definitive agreement to sells its Global Knowledge instructor-led training business to an affiliate of Enduring Ventures for $10 million with a potential to earn an additional $10 million in deferred consideration.
