= Microlearning =

Education with small learning units

Microlearning refers to a set of compact e-learning modules that are designed to reduce learner fatigue. The modules can be educational, professional, or skill-based, and are usually designed to be less than 20 minutes long, with a single learning objective or topic. The name originates from the Greek word 'micro' meaning 'small'.

== Concept ==
As an instructional technology, microlearning focuses on the design of learning modules through microsteps in digital media environments. These activities can be incorporated into the learner's daily routines and tasks. Unlike "traditional" e-learning approaches, microlearning often tends towards push technology through push media, which reduces the cognitive load on the learner. In a wide sense, microlearning can be understood as a metaphor which refers to micro-aspects of a variety of learning models, concepts, and processes and is capable enough to address challenges associated with the learning process. Breaking the information down into topical, bite-sized chunks helps to increase attention and promotes higher retention rates. The technique has also been shown to increase learner confidence with the material.

A modern definition of microlearning refers to a learning technique that involves bite-size lessons to engage learners in the process. Furthermore, microlearning marks a transition from common models of learning towards micro-perspectives on, and the significance of, micro-dimensions in the process of learning. Microlearning has also been considered as a promising topic in work-based learning, and the applications of microlearning have been widely studied in different fields. As of 2020, there were at least 476 relevant publications exploring the concept. The technique is capable of addressing challenges associated with slow learners. It is functional not only for skill-based education but also for sustainable socioeconomic development, and without taking care of micro-perspectives in the context of learning, education, training, and skill development, a skill-based education cannot be imparted effectively.

== Framework ==
A microlearning framework is characterized by the following parameters:

- Time: Microlearning modules are specifically designed as concise and short courses.
- Content: The design allows course content to be divided into smaller segments that would usually cover a single topic.
- Curriculum: A short course covering a specific topic or a series of short courses covering a bigger module.
- Form: It could vary depending on its intended use, like knowledge nuggets, episodes, skill sets, etc.
- Process: The process of microlearning involves an integrated learning segment that could be in the form of in-person sessions, video, or text, followed by an assessment to gauge the learner's performance.
- Media: In-person classes or distance learning, both of which may be based on multimedia activities.

== Subscription learning ==
Subscription learning provides an intermittent stream of learning-related interactions to subscribers. These learning-related interactions (also called "nuggets") can involve a great variety of learning-related events, including content presentation, diagnostics, scenario-based questions, job aids, reflection questions, assignments, discussions, etc. Nuggets are short, usually presented in less than ten minutes. Nuggets are intentionally scheduled over time to support learning, often utilizing research-based findings related to the spacing effect. Learners subscribe (or are subscribed) to one or more series of learning nuggets, called "threads". Learning threads can be predesigned, selecting nuggets based on anticipated learner needs, or they can be dynamically created based on learner performance.

== Action plan ==
Microlearning activity can be designed as an individual or group experience with appropriate prompts to gauge performance of the learners. The focus, however, is to keep the information short and relevant in order to maintain concentration. The activity itself could include reading a paragraph, listening to an informational podcast, watching a video clip, etc. Once observation of the content is completed, it is then followed by assessment in the form of short quizzes, micro-games, reflection of viewed content, etc. The content of the design depends upon the mode of delivery. For example, an informational podcast would be more suitable for self-paced learners who have access to the relevant source; on the other hand, reading a paragraph from a book could be more functional for more traditional learners.

== Examples ==
- Screensavers which prompt the user to solve a small series of simple tasks after a certain amount of inactivity
- Quizzes with multiple choice options on cell phones by use of SMS or mobile applications (Java midlets, Symbian)
- Word of the day as a daily RSS feed or email
- Flashcard software for memorizing content through spaced repetition
- Short videos (2–10 minutes), either presented standalone or in a series

== See also ==
- Microformats
- Microlecture

== Bibliography ==
- Giurgiu, Luminiţa (June 2017). "Microlearning an Evolving Elearning Trend". Science Bulletin. 22: 18–23. doi:10.1515/bsaft-2017-0003. S2CID 148817943.
- Gassler, Gerhard; Hug, Theo & Glahn, Christian (2004): Integrated Micro Learning – An outline of the basic method and first results. In: Auer, Michael E. & Auer, Ursula (eds.): International Conference on Interactive Computer Aided Learning, ICL 2004, Sept. 29 – Oct. 1, 2004, Villach, Austria (CD-ROM).
- Gstrein, Silvia & Hug, Theo (2005): Integrated Micro Learning during Access Delays. A new approach to second language learning. In: Zaphiris, Panayiotis (ed.): User-centered computer assisted language learning. Hershey:Idea Group Publishing, pp. 152–175.
- Hagleitner, Wolfgang; Drexler, Arthur; Hug, Theo (2006). Evaluation of a prototypic version of Knowledge Pulse in the context of a management course. Paper presented at the Multimedia Applications in Education Conference, 2006, September 4–6, FH Joanneum, Graz, Austria.
- Hug, Theo; Lindner, Martin; Bruck, Peter A. (eds.) (2006): Microlearning: Emerging Concepts, Practices and Technologies after e-Learning. Proceedings of Microlearning 2005. Innsbruck: Innsbruck University Press, 2006.
- Weber, Charles M. (2003): Rapid Learning in High Velocity Environments. Ph.D. thesis, Massachusetts Institute of Technology (M.I.T.) / Cambridge (U.S.A.).
- Leong, K., Sung, A., Au, D., & Blanchard, C. (2020). A review of the trend of microlearning. Journal of Work-Applied Management.
