= Cornerstone OnDemand =

American software company, 1999–2021

Cornerstone OnDemand, Inc.
- Type: Private
- Traded as: Nasdaq: CSOD
- ISIN: US21925Y1038
- Industry: Software
- Founded: 1999; 27 years ago, in Santa Monica
- Founders: Adam Miller; Perry Wallack; Steven Seymour
- Headquarters: Santa Monica, California, United States
- Area served: Worldwide
- Key people: Himanshu Palsule (CEO)
- Revenue: ▲$740.9 million
- Owner: Clearlake Capital
- Number of employees: Approx. 3,000
- Website: cornerstoneondemand.com

Cornerstone OnDemand, Inc. is a cloud-based human capital management software company headquartered in Santa Monica, California, providing learning management, talent management and workforce development platforms to enterprise customers. Founded in 1999 as CyberU, an online corporate training provider, the company pivoted to HR software and went public on the Nasdaq in 2011 under the ticker CSOD. In August 2021 it was acquired by private equity firm Clearlake Capital in a transaction valued at approximately $5.2 billion, taking the company private.

== History ==
Cornerstone OnDemand, Inc. was founded by Adam Miller, Perry Wallack and Steven Seymour in 1999 under the name CyberU and as a learning technology company. It is based in Santa Monica, CA.

The company went public in 2011 on NASDAQ and trades under the symbol CSOD. As of 2017, more than 3000 companies were using the company's software. With the purchase of Saba in 2020, the company expanded to 7000 users.

In 2017, the company received a $300 million investment from Linkedin and Silver Lake.

In August 2021, Cornerstone OnDemand Inc. was acquired by private equity firm Clearlake Capital Group in a deal estimated to be worth $5.2 billion. The company is now privately held.

== Acquisitions ==
Date	Company	Type	Price
2012	Sonar6	cloud-based talent management software for small business	$14 million USD
2014	Evolv	data analysis software provider	$42.5 million USD.
2018	Workpop	a developer of software to help match employers and job candidates	
2018	Grovo Learning Inc	employee learning platform	$24 million USD
2020	Clustree	a French job skills platform	$18.5 Million USD
2020	Saba	management development company	$1.4 billion USD.
2022	EdCast	Learning Experience Platform, Digital Adoption Platform and Marketplace	
2022	SumTotal	human resource management software company	
2024	TaleSpin	extended reality, spatial learning company	
2024	SkyHive	skills intelligence platform	

== See also ==
- List of talent management system companies
