= Student information system =

Software for educational institutions to manage student and school data

A student information system (SIS), student management system, school administration software or student administration system is a management information system for education sector establishments used to manage student data. It supports communication between students, parents, teachers and the administration. Student information systems provide capabilities for registering students in courses; documenting grading, transcripts of academic achievement and co-curricular activities, and the results of student assessment scores; forming student schedules; tracking student attendance; generating reports and managing other student-related data needs in an educational institution.

Information security is a concern, as universities house an array of sensitive personal information, making them potentially attractive targets for security breaches, such as those experienced by retail corporations or healthcare providers.

== Student Information System Modules ==
- Student Grading System (SGS)
- Student Scheduling System (SCH)
- Student Attendance System (SAS)

== See also ==
- Automate the Schools
- Learning Management System
- Sampoorna, school management system project implemented by the Education Department of the Government of Kerala, India
