= List of educational software =

This is a list of educational software that is computer software whose primary purpose is teaching or self-learning.

== Educational software by subject ==
=== Anatomy ===
- 3D Indiana
- Anatomography
- Bodyworks Voyager - Mission in Anatomy
- NeuroNames
- Neuroscience Information Framework
- Primal Pictures
- Visible Human Project
- ZygoteBody

=== Astronomy ===
- Aladin Sky Atlas
- Astropy
- Cartes du Ciel
- Celestia
- Deep-Sky Planner
- FITS Liberator
- Gaia Sky
- Google Sky
- HNSKY
- IRAF
- KStars
- SpaceEngine
- Stellarium
- TOPCAT
- Universe Sandbox
- WorldWide Telescope

=== Aviation ===
- Adacel
- Air Traffic Controller (series)
- DiSTI
- Digital Combat Simulator
- International Virtual Aviation Organisation
- Microsoft Flight Simulator 2024
- Mechtronix
- SkyRadar
- Virtual Air Traffic Simulation Network

=== Biology ===
- Biostatistics tools

=== Calculators ===
==== Open-source calculators ====
- DeskCalc
- GeoGebra
- GNOME Calculator
- KCalc
- Qalculate!
- Windows Calculator
- WRPN Calculator
- xcalc

==== Open-source expression / formula calculators ====
- bc (programming language)
- Calcpad
- Maxima

=== Chemistry ===
- Aqion — simulates water chemistry
- Chemaxon
- ChemWindow
- JChemPaint
- Kalzium
- NWChem
- Overleaf — web-app that uses LaTeX Chemfig for chemical structure diagrams and does chemistry notation using mhchem
- PhET Interactive Simulations
- Spartan (chemistry software)
- XDrawChem

=== Children's software ===
- Bobo Explores Light
- ClueFinders titles
- Delta Drawing
- Edmark
- Fun School titles
- GCompris — free software (GPL)
- Gold Series
- JumpStart titles
- Kiwaka
- KidPix
- Museum Madness
- Ozzie series
- Reader Rabbit titles
- Tux Paint — free software (GPL)
- Zoombinis titles

=== Computer science ===
==== Software ====
- Alice (software)
- BlueJ
- Ch
- CircuitPython
- Code.org
- CodeCombat
- Codewars
- EarSketch
- Etoys
- GitHub Codespaces
- H5P
- Hackety Hack
- JFLAP — Java Formal language and Automata Package
- Kojo (learning environment)
- Little Computer 3
- MIT App Inventor
- Racket (programming language)
- RoboMind
- Scratch (programming language)
- Smalltalk — Squeak and Pharo
- Swift Playgrounds
- VPython
- Wikitext — markup language used to edit Wikipedia, can learn using the wikipedia:Sandbox.

==== Hardware ====
- Arduino
- Fritzing
- Raspberry Pi
- Tinkercad Circuits
- List of open-source robotics hardware projects

=== Chat bots ===
- ChatGPT — OpenAI
- DeepSeek
- Gemini — Google
- Grok — xAI
- Khanmigo — Khan Academy
- Microsoft Copilot

=== Cryptography ===
- Bouncy Castle
- CrypTool — illustrates cryptographic and cryptanalytic concepts

=== Dance ===
- Dance Dance Revolution
- In The Groove
- Just Dance Now
- Pump It Up
- StepMania

=== Dictionaries and reference ===
- Britannica
- Encarta
- Encyclopædia Britannica Ultimate Reference Suite

=== Digital art ===
- Adobe Fresco
- Affinity Designer
- Blender
- GIMP
- Krita
- Pixelmator Pro
- Procreate

=== Economics ===
- Aplia
- CORE Econ
- Rmetrics

=== Engineering ===
- Chemistry software
- Construction software
- Comparison of electromagnetic simulation software
- Comparison of optimization software
- Comparison of system dynamics software
- List of 3D modeling software
- List of aerospace engineering software
- List of BIM software
- List of bioinformatics software
- List of chemical process simulators
- List of computational fluid dynamics software
- List of computer-aided engineering software
- List of computer-aided manufacturing software
- List of computer simulation software
- List of data science software
- List of discrete event simulation software
- List of electrical engineering software
- List of free and open-source EDA software
- List of free electronics circuit simulators
- List of HDL simulators
- List of numerical-analysis software
- List of scientific simulation software
- List of software for nanostructures modeling
- List of software for nuclear engineering
- List of structural engineering software
- Lists of mathematical software
- Physics software
- Power engineering software
- Wind energy software

=== Geography ===
- Cartopedia: The Ultimate World Reference Atlas
- Google Earth — (proprietary license)
- QGIS — open-source geographic information system software
- Swamp Gas Visits the United States of America — a game that teaches geography to children
- Where is Carmen Sandiego? game series

=== Geology ===
- BGS Groundhog Desktop
- Citcom
- GeoModeller
- GMS
- GPlates
- GSI3D
- MODFLOW
- Rockworks
- Seismic Unix
- The Geochemist's Workbench
- Visual MODFLOW

=== Health ===
- TeachAids
- SonoSim
- EMCrit
- EthosCE
- Free Open Access Medical education resources (FOAMed)
- Learning Resource Server Medicine

=== History ===
- Encyclopedia Encarta Timeline
- Euratlas
- Back in Time (iPad)
- Balance of Power
- Lemonade Stand
- Number Munchers
- Odell Lake
- Spellevator
- Windfall: The Oil Crisis Game
- Word Munchers

=== Home Schooling ===
- ABCmouse
- Abeka
- CK-12
- Connections Academy
- DreamBox Learning
- Edgenuity
- FlexBook
- GCompris
- Khan Academy
- Mathletics
- Penn Foster High School
- Prodigy (video game)
- Time4Learning

=== Law ===
- CALI
- DoNotPay
- Free Law Project
- Wex
- JurisPedia
- AltLaw
- Ravel Law
- WIPO Lex

=== Managed learning environments ===
- ATutor (GPL)
- Blackboard Inc.
- Chamilo
- Claroline
- eCollege
- eFront (CPAL)
- Fle3 (GPL)
- GCompris (GPL)
- Google Classroom
- ILIAS (GPL)
- Kannu
- LON-CAPA — free software (GPL)
- Moodle — free software (GPL)
- OLAT — free software
- Renaissance Place
- Sakai Project — free software
- WebAssign

=== Material science ===
- FLEUR
- Materials Studio
- MPMC

=== Mathematics ===
- Accelerated Math
- Algebrator
- Cantor
- Compu-Math: Fractions
- DataScene
- Desmos
- DrGeo
- GeoGebra
- The Geometer's Sketchpad
- Little Professor
- Matheass
- Mathletics
- Maths Pathway
- Mathspace
- Microsoft Mathematics
- Microsoft Math Solver
- MathFacts in a Flash
- StatCrunch
- Statistics Online Computational Resource
- Symbolab
- TK Solver
- WolframAlpha
- WorldWideWhiteboard
- Zearn

==== Mathematical education video games ====
- DragonBox
- FASTT Math
- FutureU
- The ClueFinders Math Adventures
- Tux, of Math Command

==== Physics ====
- Open Source Physics

=== Mapping ===
- ArcGIS Online — Esri's cloud-based mapping and spatial analysis platform
- Datawrapper — web-based interactive maps
- Google Earth Engine
- Google Sheets — choropleth maps from data tables
- QGIS — GIS software that is free and open-source, using GeoJSON, Shapefile, CSV data points to creat maps.
- OpenStreetMap — open map database updated and maintained by a community of volunteers via open collaboration
- Leaflet — JavaScript library used to build web mapping applications

=== Military ===
- Interactive Scenario Builder
- Pythagoras ABM
- Digital Combat Simulator

=== Massive open online course providers ===
==== Free / open-access ====
- Alison (freemium)
- FUN
- Khan Academy
- MIT OCW
- Stanford Online
- SWAYAM

==== Proprietary / commercial ====
- Canvas Network
- Coursera
- edX
- FutureLearn
- iversity
- Kadenze
- LinkedIn Learning
- OpenClassrooms
- openHPI
- OpenLearning
- Open Universities Australia
- Shaw Academy
- The Great Courses
- Udacity
- Udemy

=== Music ===
- Comparison of music education software
- EarMaster
- List of guitar tablature software
- MuseScore
- Syntorial
- Yousician

=== Philosophy ===
- Araucaria
- Internet Encyclopedia of Philosophy
- Kialo
- PhilPapers
- Socrates Jones: Pro Philosopher
- Stanford Encyclopedia of Philosophy
- Wireless Philosophy

=== Political science ===
- iCivics

=== Reading ===
- Accelerated Reader
- Apple Books
- AutoTutor
- Bookshare
- Compu-Read
- DISTAR
- DreamBox Learning
- GCompris
- Google Play Books
- Hooked on Phonics
- Kurzweil Educational Systems
- Learning Ally
- MobyMax
- Newsela
- Open Library
- READ 180
- Reading Eggs
- STAR (software)

=== Science ===
- Betty's Brain
- Science Sleuths

=== Simulation ===
==== Simulation games ====
- Caesar titles
- Capitalism
- Civilization
- The Oregon Trail
- Sid Meier's Colonization
- SimCity
- Zoo Tycoon

=== Spaced Repetition ===
- Anki
- Memrise
- Mnemosyne
- SuperMemo
- Synap

=== Touch-Typing Instruction ===
- Mavis Beacon Teaches Typing
- Mario Teaches Typing
- Ratatype
- Smorball
- Touch Typist Typing Tutor
- Tux Typing — free software (GPL)
- Typequick

=== Visual Learning and Mind Mapping ===
- ConceptDraw MINDMAP
- Freemind — free software (GPL)
- Perception
- SpicyNodes

=== 3D modeling ===
- Blender
- FreeCAD
- Autodesk Fusion 360
- LeoCAD
- Shapr3D
- Sketchup Free — web-app
- Tinkercad

== Notable brands and suppliers of educational software ==
- Dorling Kindersley
- Promethean World
- Renaissance Learning
- Houghton Mifflin Harcourt Learning Technology (previously Riverdeep)
- KDE Education Project
- SMART Technologies
- Software4Students
- RM plc

=== Historical brands and suppliers ===
- Edu-Ware
- JumpStart Games (previously Knowledge Adventure)
  - Davidson & Associates (merged with Knowledge Adventure)
- SoftKey (acquired by Mattel, then Riverdeep)
  - Broderbund (acquired by Softkey)
  - The Learning Company (acquired by SoftKey)
    - Creative Wonders (acquired by the Learning Company)
  - MECC (acquired by Softkey)
- Edmark (acquired by Riverdeep)

== See also ==
- List of online educational resources
- List of educational technology companies
- List of free educational software
