= YouTube in education =

Use of the video platform YouTube for educational purposes

YouTube in education refers to the use of the video-sharing platform YouTube for educational purposes in both formal and informal learning environments. A 2018 Pew Research Center survey found that 51% of YouTube users say the platform is very important for helping them learn new skills, representing 35% of all U.S. adults.

Since YouTube's launch in 2005, educational institutions like MIT OpenCourseWare and TED have used the platform to distribute content, while independent creators have developed popular educational channels such as Khan Academy, Smarter Every Day, and Vsauce. The platform has been adopted across various educational fields, including medical education, where studies have shown both benefits and limitations in teaching clinical skills and anatomical concepts. YouTube also created YouTube EDU in 2009 as a dedicated repository for educational content from institutions and creators.

== History ==
YouTube was founded as a video sharing platform in 2005 and is now the most visited website in the US as of 2019. Almost immediately after the site's launch, educational institutions, such as MIT OpenCourseWare and TED, were using it for the distribution of their content. Soon after, many independent creators began to experiment with science learning. Some of the most popular early educators are listed below:

=== Khan Academy ===
Khan Academy creates tutorials in almost all areas of science and mathematics, as well as providing official SAT preparation. The YouTube channel was founded in 2006 by Sal Khan, who at the time was working as a financial analyst. The videos he created reached unprecedented levels of popularity, with hundreds of millions of views in the first few years of operation. This led Khan to start the Khan Academy Non-profit Organization in 2008 and quit his job to focus on education in 2009. To date, Khan Academy has produced over 20,000 videos with over 1.7 billion views on YouTube.

=== Smarter Every Day ===
Destin Sandlin, the creator of the YouTube channel "Smarter Every Day", has been posting educational videos on the site since 2007. Each episode of the series poses a specific question or topic. Over the course of about a half an hour, Sandlin meets with experts and experiments with different concepts in order to gain an in depth understanding of the topic, and presents it to the YouTube audience. Sandlin's videos covers everything from in depth rocket science to understanding the way our brain works by training to use a "backwards bike".

=== Vsauce ===
Vsauce began in the mind of Michael Stevens in 2010, with the name itself coming from a random name generator. The channel originally focused on shows such as DONG (Do Online Now Guys) which showcased cool and interesting websites. However, the main videos on the Vsauce channel that gained a massive amount of attention came with the educational videos. In these short videos, Stevens takes a simple question and uses math, physics, and even psychology to deconstruct the question and pose an interesting conclusion to the topic through the lens of analytic thinking. Today, Vsauce is now one of the most popular educational channels on the platform, and has led to the creation of other channels such as Vsauce 2 and 3, hosted by Kevin Lieber and Jake Roper respectively. Stevens also co-hosted a live show called Brain Candy Live! with Mythbusters' former host Adam Savage which toured across the United States in 2017.

=== YouTube EDU ===
YouTube created YouTube EDU in 2009 as a repository for its educational content. As of 2015, over 700,000 videos were part of YouTube EDU. Content within YouTube EDU is produced by PBS, Khan Academy, Steve Spangler Science, Numberphile, and TED, among others.

== Medical education ==
YouTube videos have been used to teach medical content. In an anatomy course incorporating YouTube, 98% of students watched the assigned videos and 92% stated that they were helpful in teaching anatomical concepts. A 2013 study focused on clinical skills education from YouTube found that the 100 most accessible videos across a variety of topics (venipuncture, wound care, pain assessment, CPR, and others) were generally unsatisfactory.

The value of YouTube in relation to dentistry and dental education has also been evaluated. Dentistry videos specifically categorized as "education" were rated as having a much higher value to dentistry students compared to videos in the more broad "all" category. Most of the videos marked as "education" were viewed as remarkably high quality by dental experts.

== Educational YouTube channels ==
- 3Blue1Brown
- AsapScience
- Big Think
- BrainCraft
- Bright Side
- Crash Course
- CGP Grey
- Cody'sLab
- Deep Look
- Edutopia
- Easy Languages
- Fern
- freeCodeCamp
- Geography Now
- How It's Made
- How Money Works
- HowStuffWorks
- Institute of Human Anatomy
- Integza
- Khan Academy
- Kurzgesagt — In a nutshell
- Lex Fridman podcast
- Mathologer
- MinutePhysics, MinuteEarth and MinuteFood
- MIT OpenCourseWare
- MKBHD
- NileRed
- Numberphile and Computerphile
- OverSimplified
- PBS Digital Studios
- Periodic Videos
- Philosophy Tube
- Practical Engineering
- Real Engineering
- Real Science
- Religion for Breakfast
- SciShow
- Scott Manley
- SmarterEveryDay
- Steve Mould
- TED talks and TEDEd
- The Action Lab
- The Armchair Historian
- The Blender Guru
- The Coding Train
- The School of Life
- Tom Scott
- UsefulCharts
- Veritasium
- Vox Media
- Vsauce
- Wendover Productions
- Wired
- Wireless Philosophy
- Zach Star

== See also ==
- List of educational software
- List of online educational resources
- StudyTube
- Social impact of YouTube
- Science communication
- Science education
