= Emmabuntüs =

Linux distribution based on Ubuntu

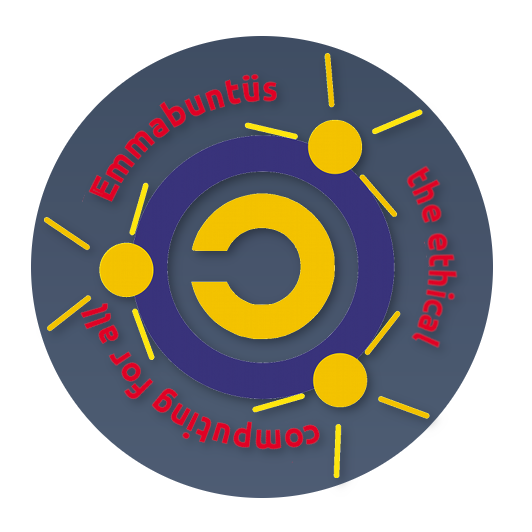

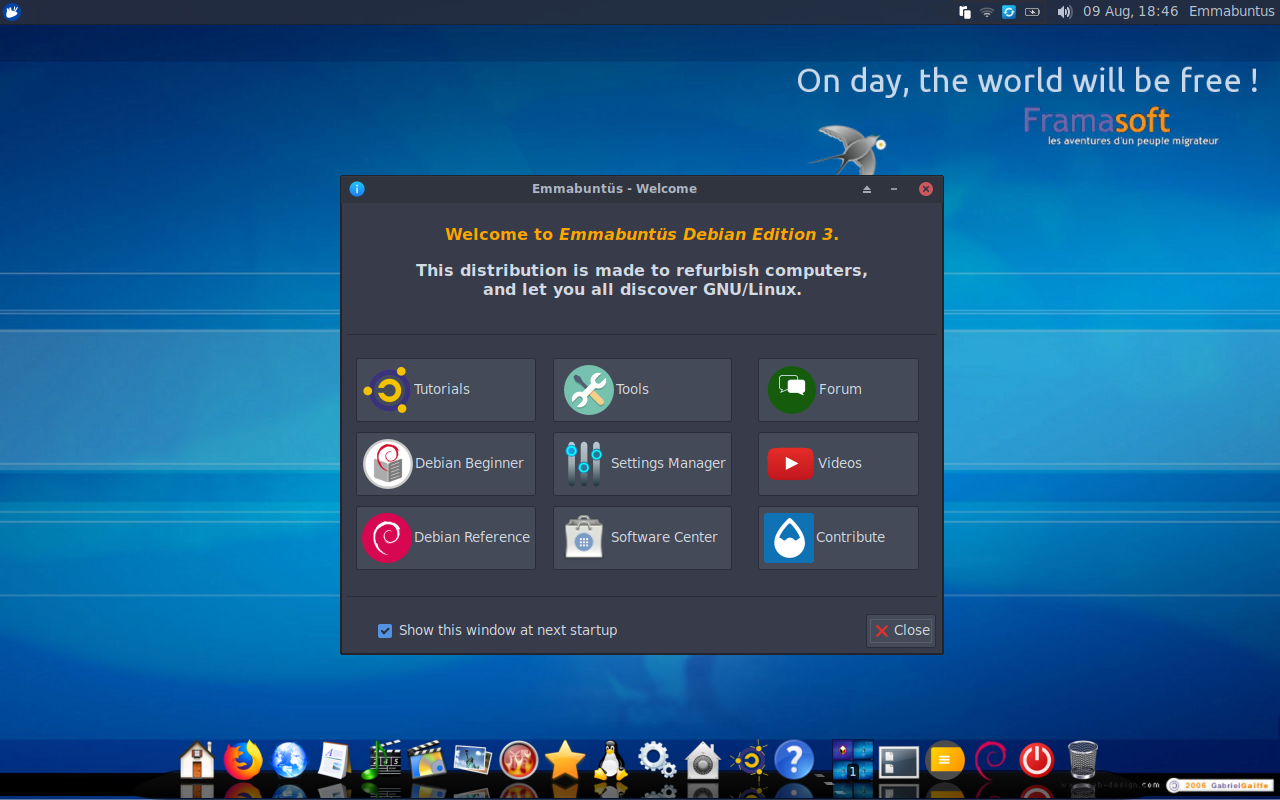
- Emmabuntüs DE 3 XFCE
- Developer: Collectif Emmabuntüs
- OS family: Linux (Unix-like)
- Working state: Current
- Source model: Open source
- Initial release: May 2011; 14 years ago
- Latest release: DE5 1.04 / 24 March 2025; 4 months ago
- Available in: Multilingual
- Update method: APT
- Package manager: dpkg (Synaptic)
- Supported platforms: i386 AMD64
- Kernel type: Monolithic Linux kernel
- Userland: GNU
- Default user interface: Xfce
- License: Free software licenses (mainly GPL)
- Official website: emmabuntus.org

Emmabuntüs is a Linux distribution derived from Debian (previously Ubuntu) and designed to facilitate the restoration of computers donated to humanitarian organizations like the Emmaüs Communities.

The name Emmabuntüs is a portmanteau of Emmaüs and Ubuntu.

== Features ==
- This Linux distribution can be installed, in its entirety, without an Internet connection as all of the required packages are included within the disk image. The disk image includes packages for multiple languages and also optional non-free codecs that the user can choose whether to install or not.
- Emmabuntüs says one gigabyte of RAM is required for the distribution's supported releases.
- An installation script automatically performs some installation steps (user name, password predefined). The script allows the client user to choose whether or not to install non-free software and whether or not to uninstall unused languages to save disk space.
- Emmabuntüs includes browser plug-ins for data privacy.
- There are three dock types to choose from to simplify access to the software and are defined by the type of user (children, beginners and "all").

== Desktop environment ==
The desktop environment is Xfce with Cairo-Dock. LXQt is also included.

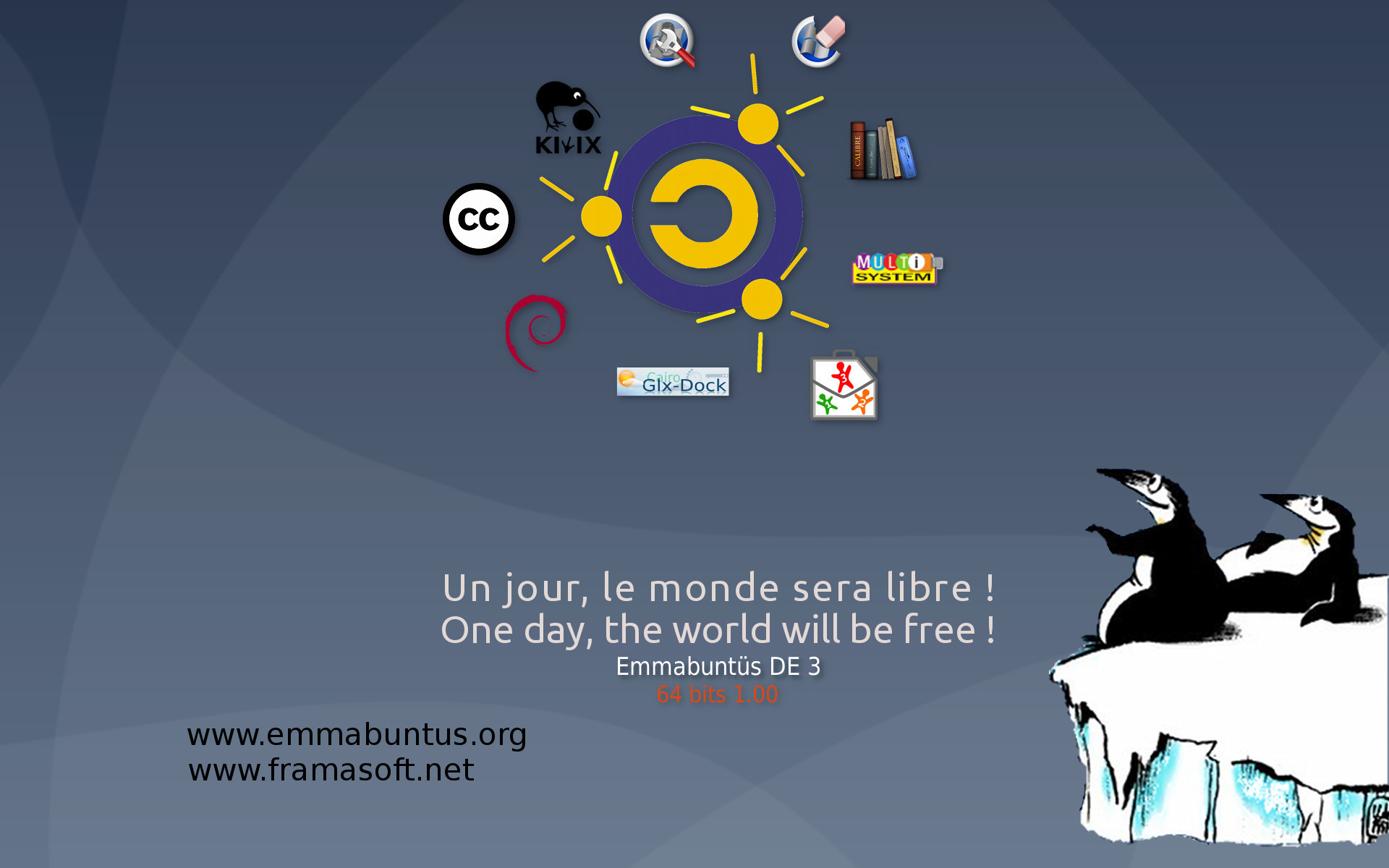
Startup Screenshot

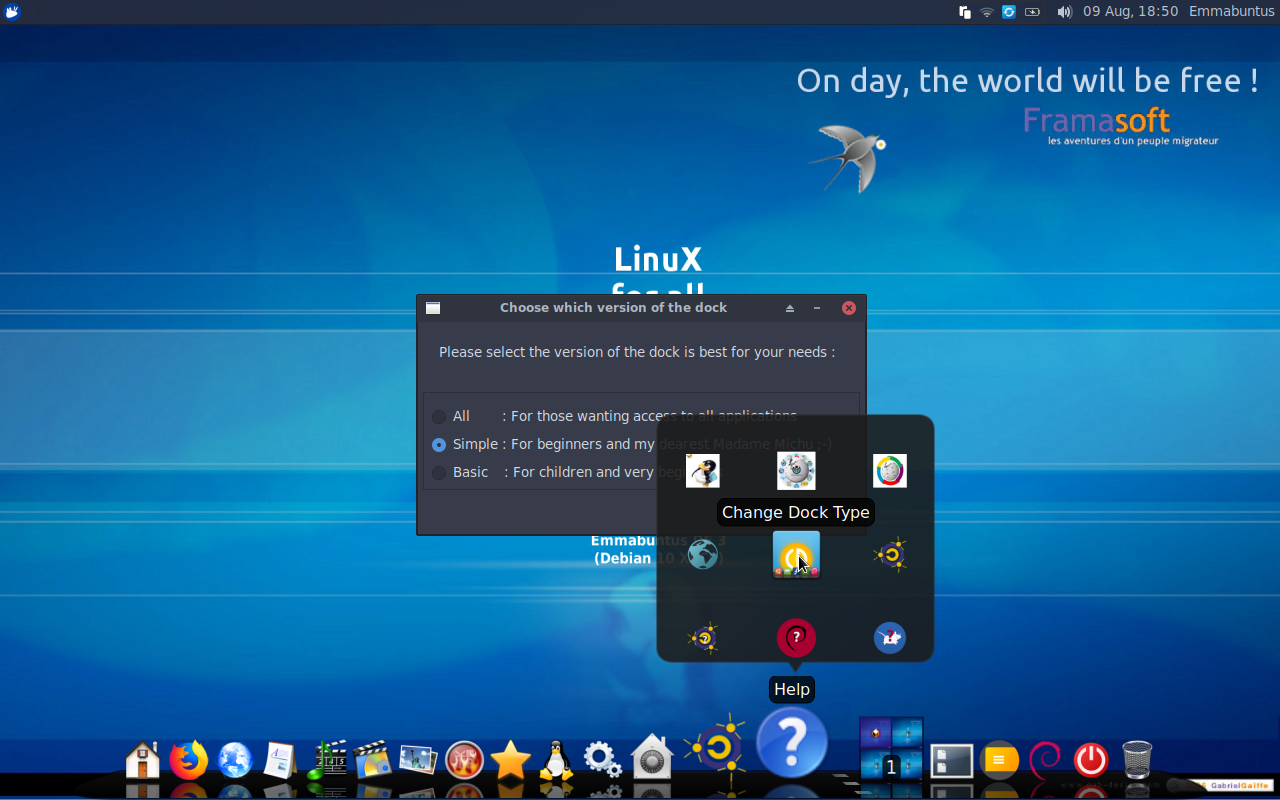
Changing the profile of the dock

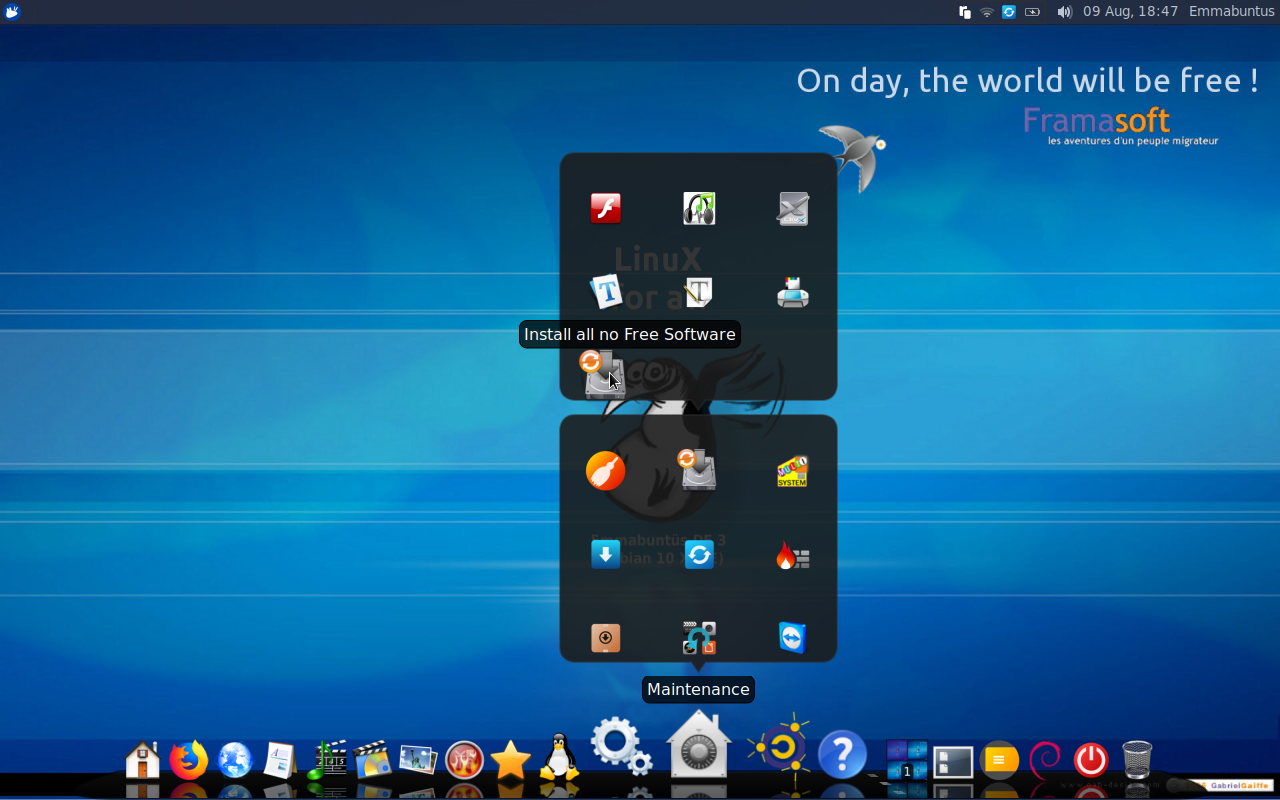
Non-free codecs installation

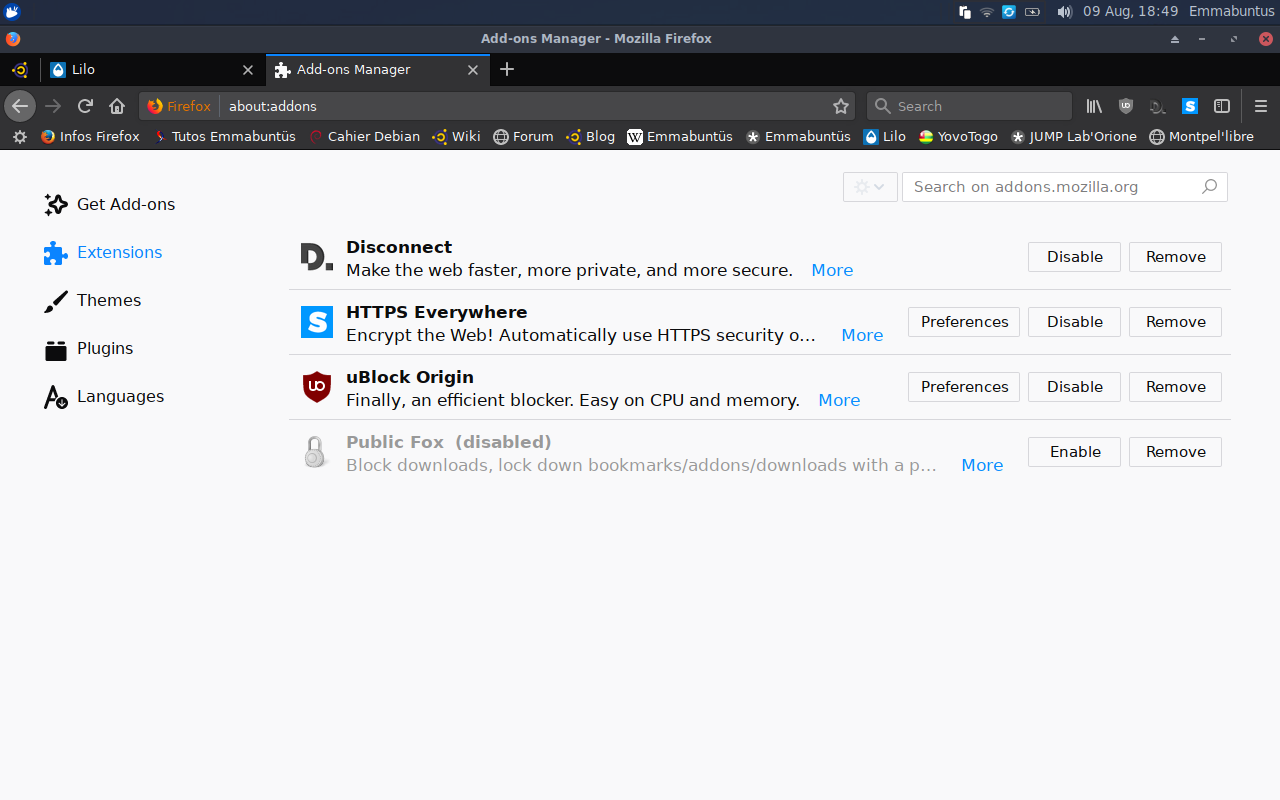
Extensions included in the Firefox browser

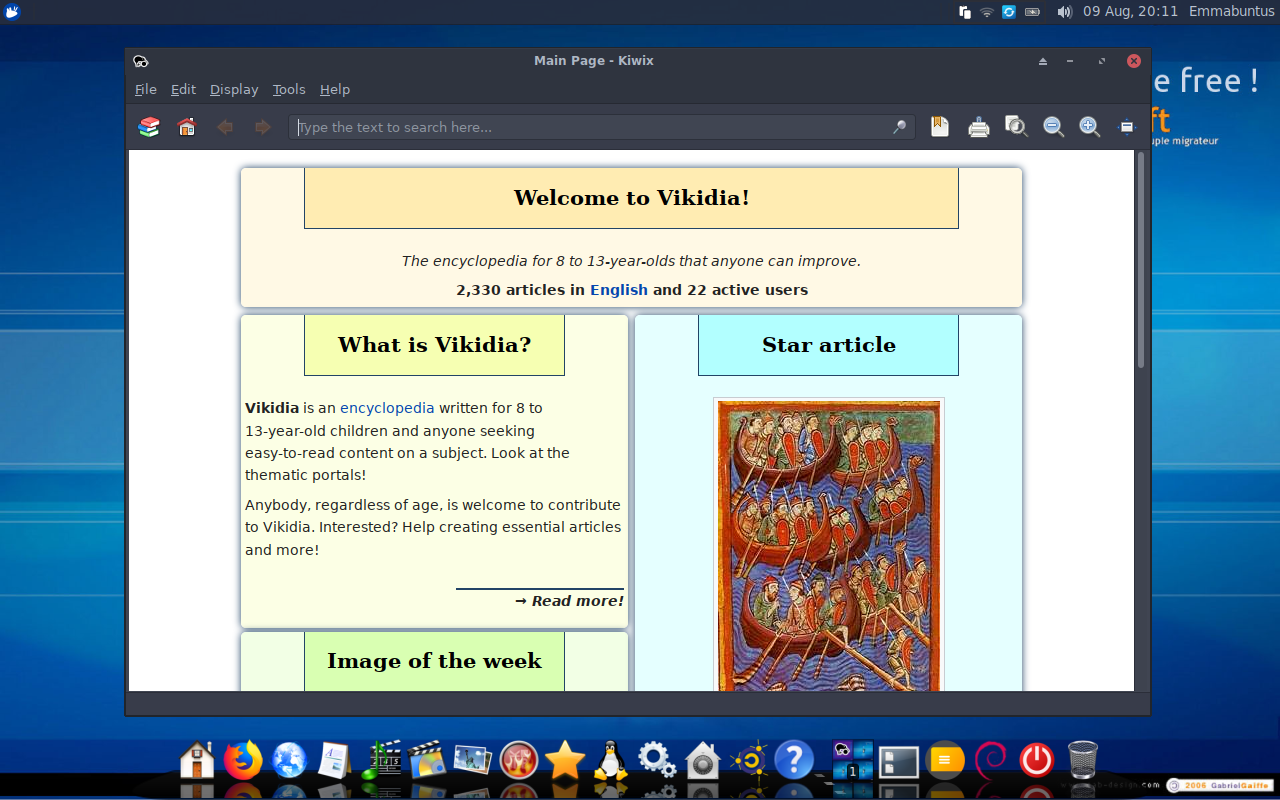
Kiwix offline wiki reader

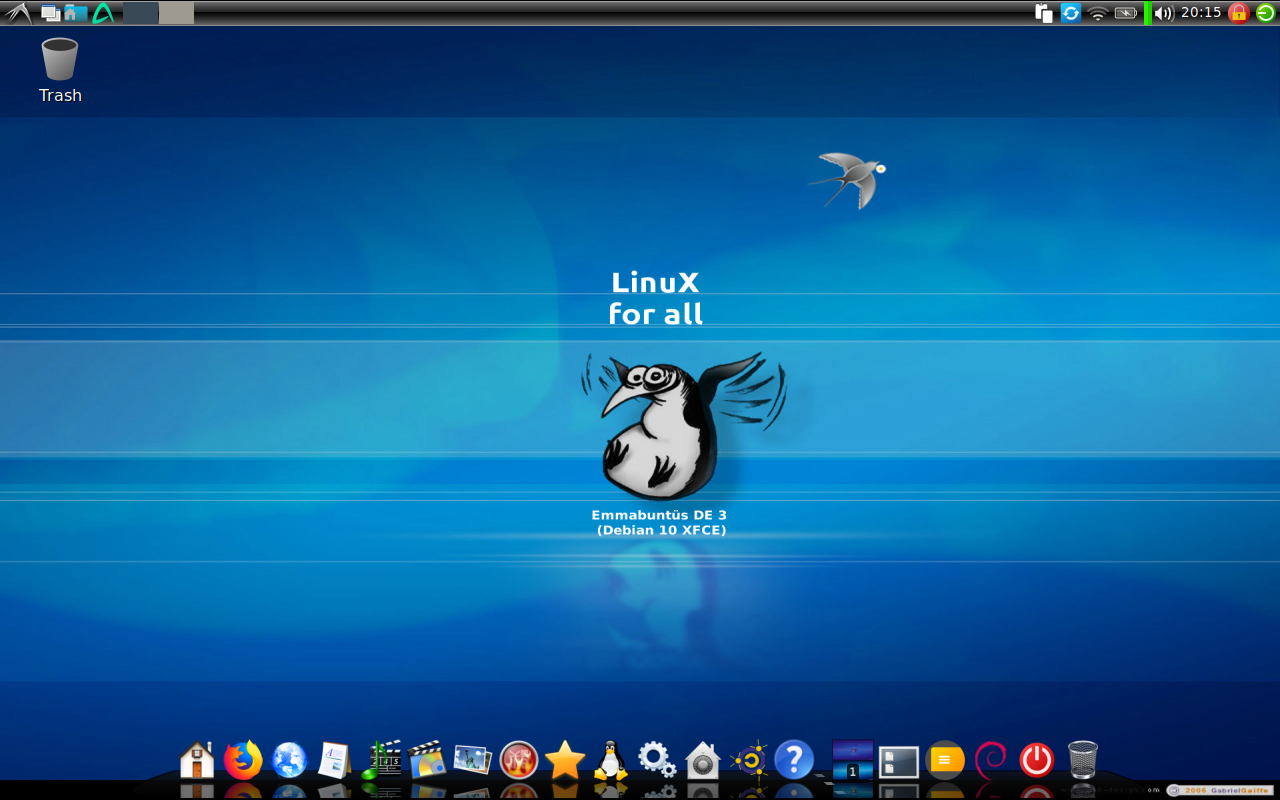
Screenshot of the LXDE environment

== Applications ==
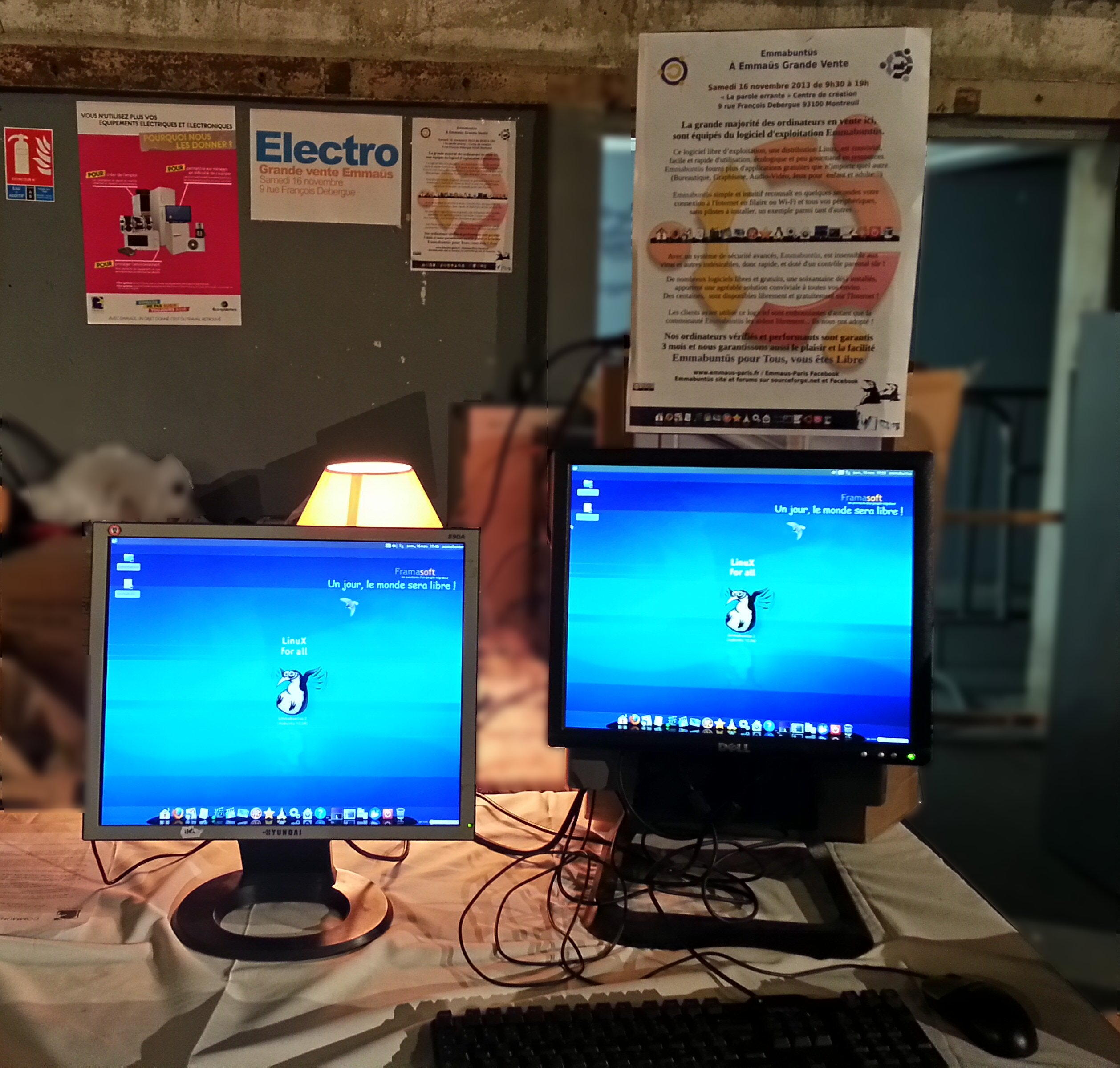
Stand selling computers running Emmabuntüs during the Big Sale for Emmaus, Paris

Multiple applications are installed that perform the same task in order to provide a choice for each user that uses the system. Here are some examples:

- Firefox web browser with some plug-ins and extensions: uBlock Origin, Disconnect, HTTPS Everywhere
- E-mail readers: Mozilla Thunderbird
- Instant messaging: Pidgin, Jitsi
- Transfer tools: FileZilla, Wammu Transmission
- Office: AbiWord, Gnumeric, HomeBank, LibreOffice, LibreOffice for schools, Kiwix, Calibre, Scribus
- Audio: Audacious, Audacity, Clementine, PulseAudio, Asunder
- Video: Kaffeine, VLC media player, guvcview, Kdenlive, HandBrake
- Photo: Nomacs, GIMP, Inkscape
- Burning discs: Xfburn
- Games: PlayOnLinux, SuperTux, TuxGuitar
- Genealogy: Ancestris
- Education: GCompris, Stellarium, Tux Paint, TuxMath, Scratch
- Utilities: GParted, Wine, CUPS

== Releases ==
Name	Base	Release date	Size (GB)	Desktop environment	Architecture	Linux kernel
Emmabuntüs Equitable	Ubuntu 10.04 LTS	2012-04-28	2.7	GNOME	x86	2.6.32
Lemmabuntüs Equitable	Lubuntu 10.04	2012-03-10	1.6	LXDE	x86	2.6.32
Emmabuntüs 2	Xubuntu 12.04 LTS	2014-12-18	3.5	Xfce or LXDE	x86 & AMD64	3.2.60
Emmabuntüs 3	Xubuntu 14.04 LTS	2015-10-12	3.8	Xfce or LXDE	x86 & AMD64	3.19.0
Emmabuntüs DE	Debian 8	2016-06-20	3.6	Xfce or LXDE	x86 & AMD64	3.16.0
Emmabuntüs DE 2	Debian 9	2018-01-29	3.5	Xfce or LXDE	x86 & AMD64	4.9.0
Emmabuntüs DE 3 1.00	Debian 10	2019-09-16	3.0	Xfce or LXDE	x86 & AMD64	4.19.0
Emmabuntüs DE 3 1.03	Debian 10	2020-11-03	3.0	Xfce or LXDE	x86 & AMD64	4.19.0
Emmabuntüs DE 4	Debian 11	2021	4.0	Xfce or LXQt	x86 & AMD64	5.10.0
Emmabuntüs DE 4 1.03	Debian 11.6	2023-02-27	4.0	Xfce or LXQt	x86 & AMD64	5.10.0
Emmabuntüs DE 5	Debian 12	2023-09-29	5.0	Xfce or LXQt	x86 & AMD64	6.1.0
Legend: Old version, not maintained Older version, still maintained Current stable version Future version

== See also ==
- List of Linux distributions § Ubuntu-based
