= IOHA =

IOHA may refer to:

- Institute of Human Anatomy, a human cadaver lab with a significant online following
- Irish Olympic Handball Association, an Irish sports association
- International Oral History Association, a professional association for oral historians
