= Tux Typing =

Free typing tutor software

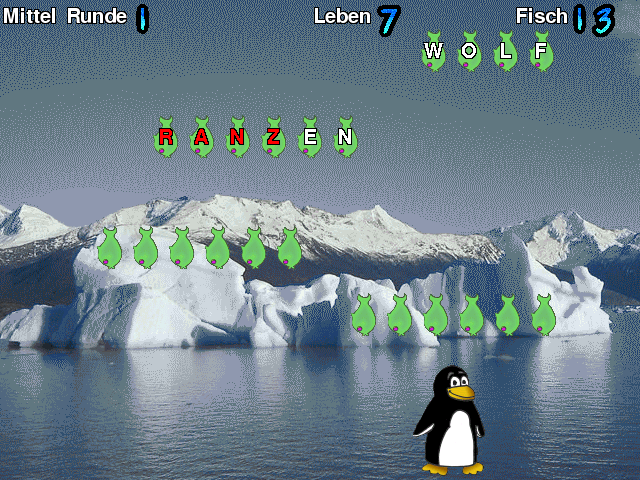
- Developer: Community Project
- Stable release: 1.8.3 / August 20, 2014; 12 years ago
- Written in: C
- Operating system: Cross-platform
- Available in: English
- Type: Educational Typing Tutor for Children
- License: GNU General Public License
- Website: www.tux4kids.com/tuxtyping.html
- Repository: github.com/tux4kids/tuxtype

Tux Typing is a free and open source typing tutor created especially for children. It features several different types of game play, with a variety of difficulty levels. It is designed to be fun and to improve words per minute speed of typists.

It is written in the C programming language and is available in the repositories of some Linux distributions such as Fedora.

== Interface ==
There is a practice mode for learning the basics of typing. There are also two games. In the first, fish are falling from the sky. Each fish has a letter or a word written on it. When the player presses the corresponding key, or types the appropriate word, Tux will position himself to eat the fish. The second game is similar, but the goal is to prevent comets from falling on a city. When a comet lands on the city, the shield will be removed. Then if it is hit again without the shield, it disappears. If it is hit by a comet while the city is destroyed, points will be deducted. In both games, different languages can be selected as a source for the words.

There has been a recreation of the game titled "Tux Typing +"

== See also ==
- Tux, of Math Command
- Tux Paint
- GCompris
- Ratatype
