= Foam (disambiguation) =

Foam is a substance that is formed by trapping gas bubbles in a liquid or solid.

Foam may also refer to:

== Military ==
- Flag officer Attached Middle East, a former major command of the Royal Navy
- USS Foam, a United States Navy trawler and minesweeper in commission from 1918 to 1919

== Organizations ==
- Foam Fotografiemuseum Amsterdam, known as Foam, a photography museum in Amsterdam

== Other uses ==
- Foam (culinary), a modern food preparation and presentation technique
- Foam (film), 2020 short film
- Foam hand, a sports paraphernalia item
- OpenFOAM, an open-source finite volume partial differential equation solver used in fluid dynamics applications
- Foam, the schooner that took the 1st Marquess of Dufferin and others on the 1856 voyage that inspired the book, Letters from High Latitudes
- First Office Action on the Merits, a form of office action in United States patent law
- Free Open Access Medical education, sometimes called FOAMed, a worldwide movement to share medical knowledge and continuing education

== See also ==
- Foamer, a derogatory name for people interested in trains and rail transport systems.
- Foamy (disambiguation)
