= MinutePhysics =

Educational YouTube channel

YouTube information
- Channels: MinutePhysics; MinuteEarth; MinuteFood
- Years active: 2011–present
- Genres: Education, science, physics, philosophy
- Subscribers: 5.94 million (MinutePhysics); 3.24 million (MinuteEarth); 369 thousand (MinuteFood)
- Views: 576 million (MinutePhysics); 594 million (MinuteEarth); 72.0 million (MinuteFood)
- Last updated: January 22, 2026

MinutePhysics is an educational YouTube channel created by Henry Reich in 2011. The channel's videos use whiteboard animation to explain physics-related topics. Early videos on the channel were approximately one minute long. As of January 2026, the channel has over 5.94 million subscribers.

== Background and video content ==
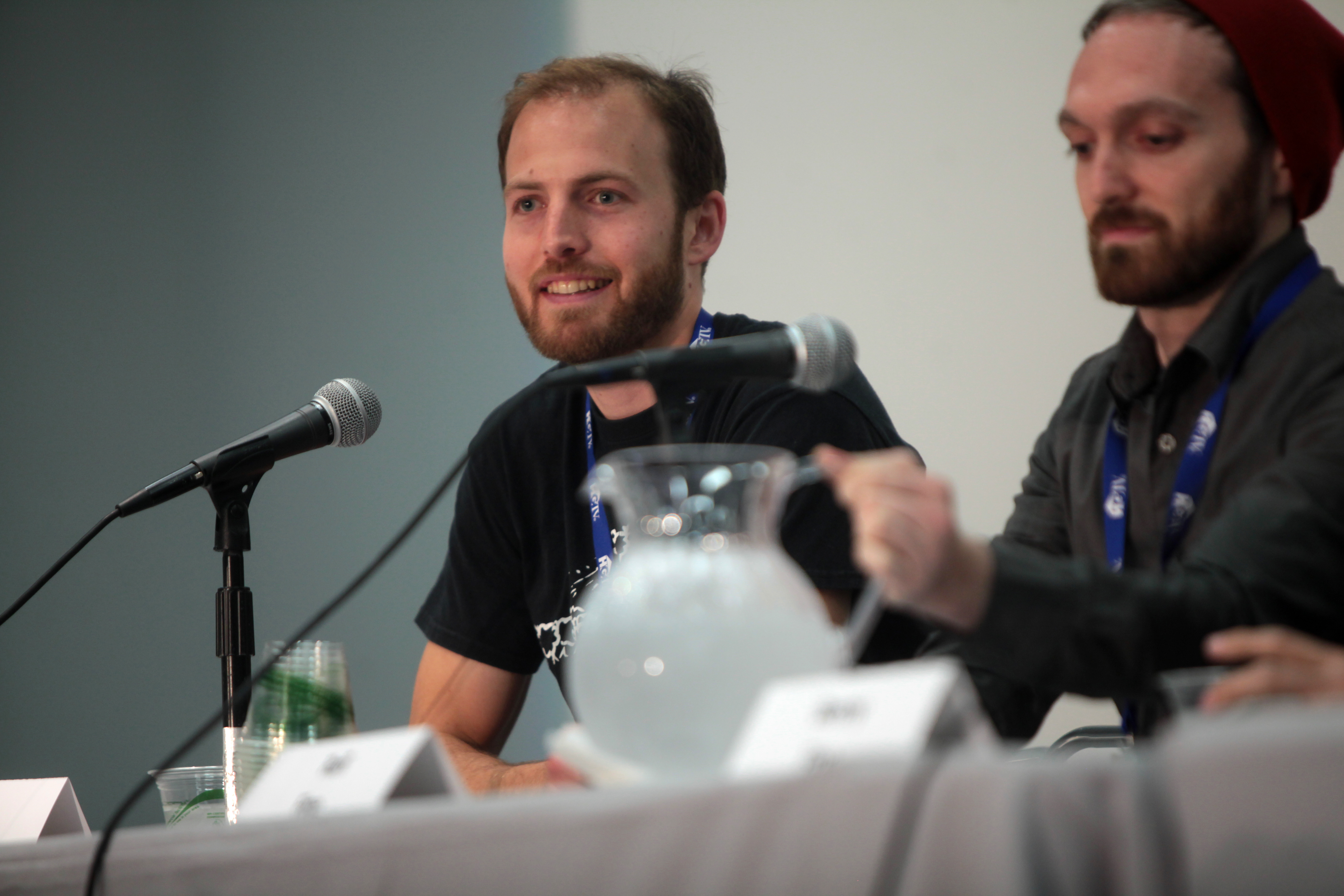
Reich at VidCon in 2014

MinutePhysics was created by Henry Reich in 2011. Reich attended Grinnell College, where he studied mathematics and physics. He then attended the Perimeter Institute for Theoretical Physics, where he earned his master's degree in theoretical physics from the institute's Perimeter Scholars International program.

The video content on MinutePhysics deals with concepts in physics. Examples of videos Reich has uploaded onto the channel include one dealing with the concept of "touch" in regards to electromagnetism. Another deals with the concept of dark matter. The most viewed MinutePhysics video, with more than 20 million views, discusses whether it is more suitable to walk or to run when trying to avoid rain. Reich also has uploaded a series of three videos explaining the Higgs Boson. In March 2020, Reich produced a video that explained exponential projection of statistics as data is being collected, using the evolving record related to COVID-19 data.

=== Collaborations ===
MinutePhysics has collaborated with Vsauce, as well as the director of the Perimeter Institute for Theoretical Physics, Neil Turok, and Destin Sandlin (Smarter Every Day). MinutePhysics also has made two videos that were narrated by Neil deGrasse Tyson and one video narrated by Tom Scott. The channel also collaborated with physicist Sean M. Carroll in a five-part video series on time and entropy and with Grant Sanderson on a video about a lost lecture of physicist Richard Feynman, as well as a video about Bell's Theorem. In 2015, Reich collaborated with Randall Munroe on a video titled "How To Go To Space", which was animated similarly to the style found in Munroe's webcomic xkcd.

Google tapped Reich for their 2017 "Be Internet Awesome" campaign, a video series aimed at creating a safer Internet space for children.

=== Related channels ===
In October 2011, Reich, along with his father Peter and brother Alex, started MinuteEarth. The channel features a similar style to MinutePhysics videos, with a focus on the Earth sciences, medicine, and general health. MinuteEarth's team has since expanded to additional members.

In March 2022, MinuteFood was launched by MinuteEarth staffers Kate Yoshida and Arcadi Garcia. Its videos focus on food science.

== Production and release ==
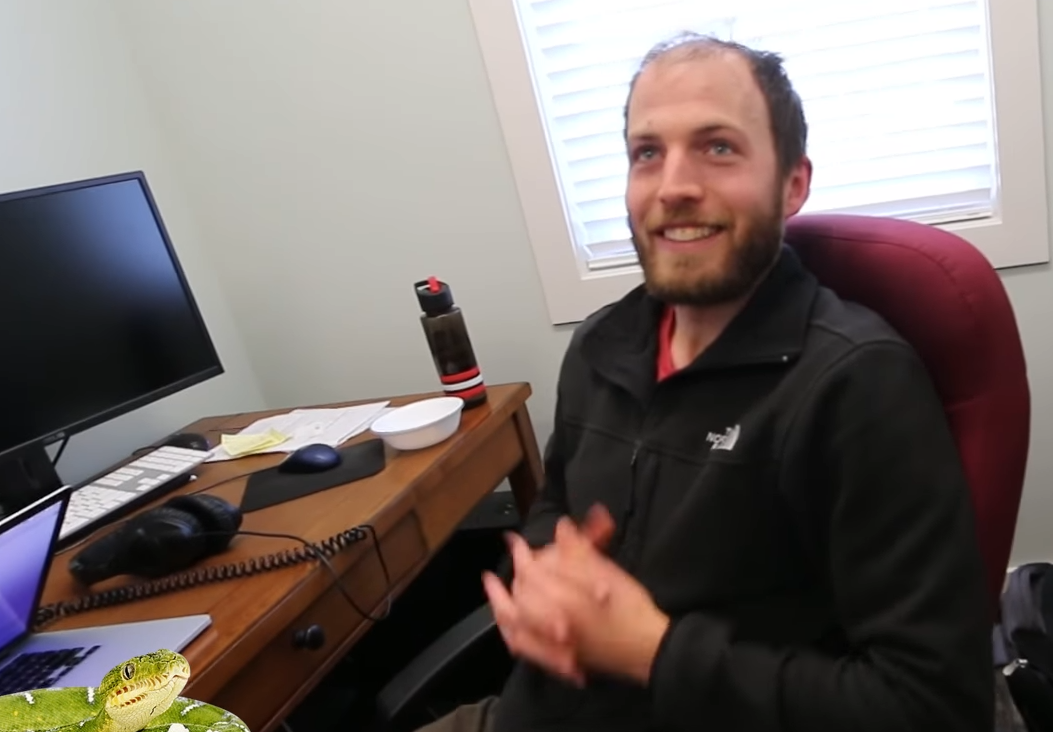
Reich in 2017

Neptune Studios is the parent company of Reich's channels. MinutePhysics videos can be viewed through YouTube EDU. Videos from the channel published prior to April 2016 are also made available to download as a podcast.

Some videos of Reich's receive the sponsorship of organizations. For example, a 2017 MinutePhysics video describing the characteristics of neutrino oscillation was sponsored by the Heising-Simons Foundation.

MinutePhysics was one of the original founders of the Standard creator community along with Dave Wiskus, CGP Grey, Philipp Dettmer and many other creators. Through Standard, MinutePhysics has released most of his content on Standard's Nebula streaming service, mostly the same videos he posts on YouTube but ad and sponsorship free, but he also releases some Nebula Originals only on the platform, including two exclusive Nebula Originals MinuteBody and The Illegal Alien.

== Reception ==
Reich's channels have amassed a considerable following online. By 2015, the National Center for Science Education (NCSE) described MinutePhysics and MinuteEarth as "definitely well known and well received" among an audience of science communicators.

His 2014 "Evolution vs Natural Selection" video on the MinutePhysics channel received criticism from the NCSE. Writing for the NCSE, Stephanie Keep expressed issue with the video's content, stating "not all evolution occurs by natural selection. To think it does lends itself to a hyper-adaptive view of life."
