= Foamy (disambiguation) =

Foamy in an adjective that describes a foam-like texture. Foamy may also refer to:

- Foamy the squirrel, a character in the webtoon, Neurotically Yours
- Foamy the Freakadog, a briefly appearing sidekick to the eponymous superhero on the Freakazoid! television show

== See also ==
- Foam (disambiguation)
