= Tux Paint =

Graphics software

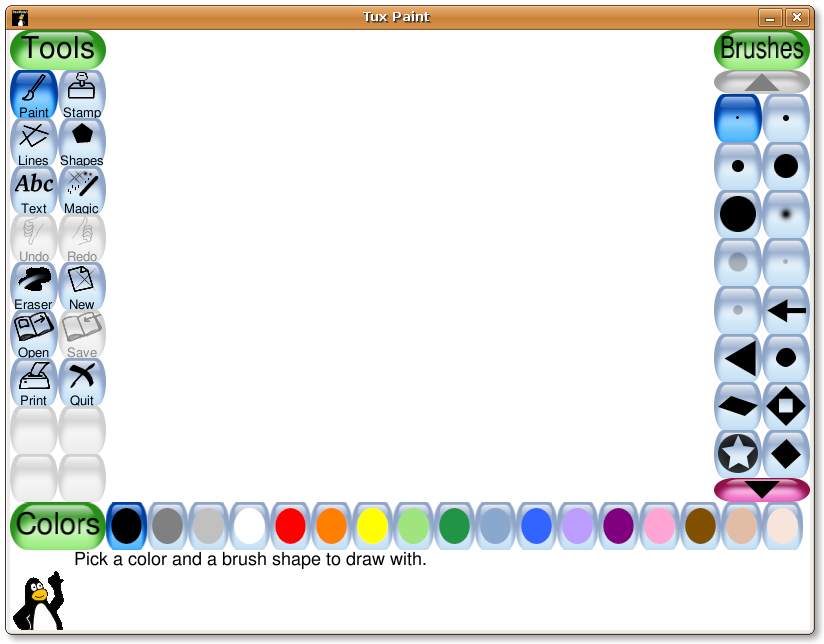
- Screenshot of the drawing canvas
- Developers: Bill Kendrick, et al.
- Initial release: June 16, 2002; 23 years ago
- Stable release: 0.9.35 / 26 May 2025
- Repository: sourceforge.net/p/tuxpaint/_list/git
- Written in: C
- Operating system: Microsoft Windows, Linux, macOS, Android, Haiku, OpenBSD
- Type: Raster graphics editor
- License: GPL-2.0-or-later
- Website: tuxpaint.org

Tux Paint is a free and open source raster graphics editor geared towards young children. The project was started in 2002 by Bill Kendrick who continues to maintain and improve it, with help from numerous volunteers. Tux Paint is seen by many as a free software alternative to Kid Pix, a similar proprietary educational software product.

== History ==
Tux Paint was initially created for the Linux operating system, as there was no suitable drawing program for young children available for Linux at that time. It is written in the C programming language and uses various free and open source helper libraries, including the Simple DirectMedia Layer (SDL), and has since been made available for Microsoft Windows, Apple macOS, Android, Haiku, and other platforms.

Selected milestone releases:

- 2002.06.16 (June 16, 2002) – initial release (brushes, stamps, lines, eraser), two days after coding started.
- 2002.06.30 (June 30, 2002) – first Magic Tools added (blur, blocks, negative).
- 2002.07.31 (July 31, 2002) – localization support added.
- 0.9.11 (June 17, 2003) – right-to-left support, UTF-8 support in Text tool.
- 0.9.14 (October 12, 2004) – Tux Paint Config. configuration tool released, Starter image support.
- 0.9.16 (October 21, 2006) – slideshow feature, animated and directional brushes.
- 0.9.17 (July 1, 2007) – arbitrary screen size and orientation support, SVG support, input method support.
- 0.9.18 (November 21, 2007) – Magic Tools turned into plug-ins, Pango text rendering.
- 0.9.25 (December 20, 2020) – support for exporting individual drawings and slideshows (as animated GIFs).
- 0.9.28 (June 4, 2022) – 20-year milestone release, adds the ability to use any color by setting hue and saturation instead of a static palette.
- 0.9.29 (April 2, 2023) – introduces fifteen new Plugins, improvements to the Stamp and Shapes tool and a new quick start guide.

== Features ==
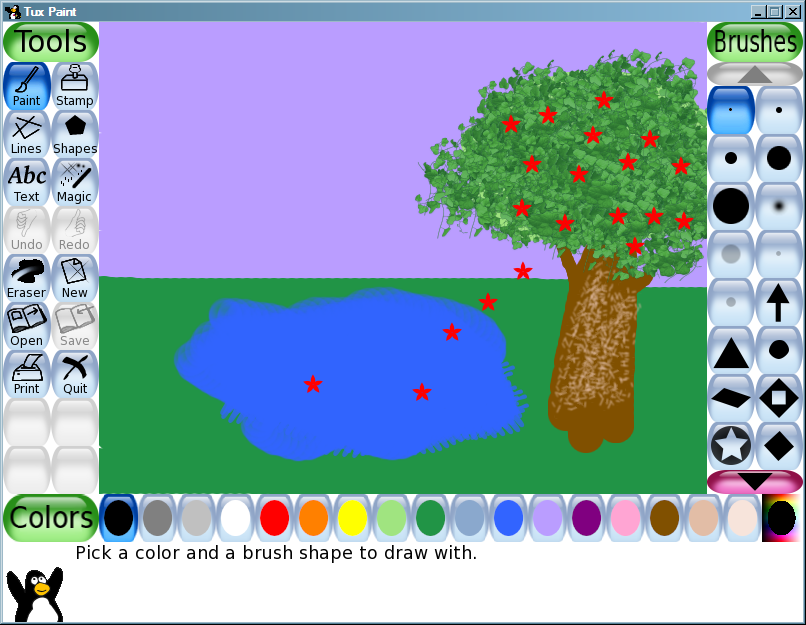
Drawing with the Paint tool

Tux Paint stands apart from typical graphics editing software (such as GIMP or Photoshop) that it was designed to be usable by children as young as 3 years of age. The user interface is meant to be intuitive, and utilizes icons, audible feedback and textual hints to help explain how the software works. The brightly colored interface, sound effects and cartoon mascot (Tux, the mascot of the Linux kernel) are meant to engage children.

Tux Paint's normal interface is split into five sections:

- Toolbox, containing the various basic tools and application controls (undo, save, new, print).
- Canvas, where the images are drawn and edited.
- Color palette, where colors can be chosen (when applicable to the current tool).
- Selector, providing various selectable objects (e.g., brushes, fonts or sub-tools, depending on the current tool).
- Information area, where instructions, tips and encouragement are provided.

A simple slideshow feature allows previously saved images to be displayed as a basic flip-book animation or as a slide presentation.

=== Basic drawing tools ===
Like most popular graphics editing and composition tools, Tux Paint includes a paintbrush, an eraser, and tools to draw lines, polygonal shapes and text. Tux Paint provides multiple levels of undo and redo, allowing accidental or unwanted changes to be removed while editing a picture.

=== Files and printing ===
Tux Paint was designed in such a way that the user does not need to understand the underlying operating system or how to deal with files. The "Save" and "Open" commands were designed to mimic those of software for personal digital assistant devices, such as the Palm handheld. When one saves a picture in Tux Paint, they do not need to provide a file name or browse for where to place it. When one goes to open a previously saved picture, a collection of thumbnails of saved images is shown.

Similarly, printing is typically a 'no questions asked' process, as well.

Beginning with version 0.9.25, Tux Paint offers the ability to export individual drawings, as well as slideshow animations in animated GIF format.

=== Advanced drawing tools ===
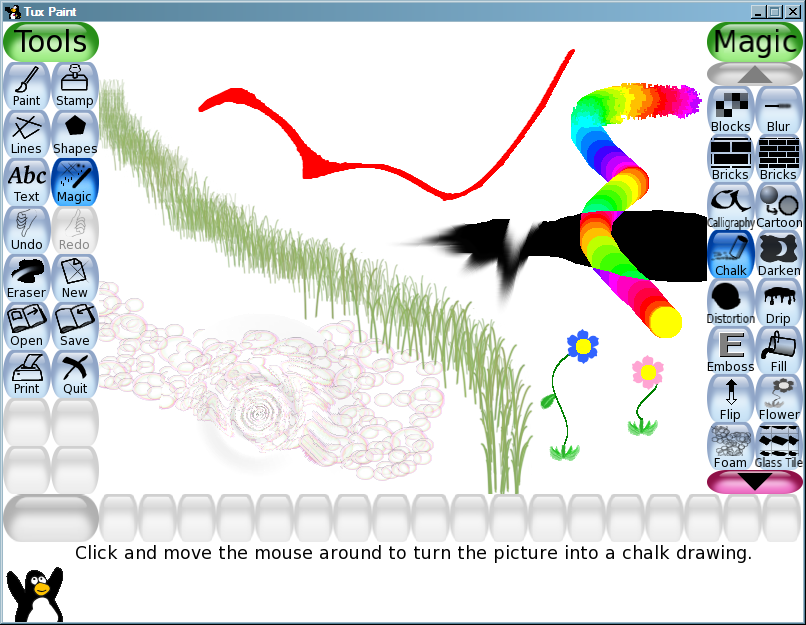
A drawing made with a variety of Magic Tools

Tux Paint includes a number of 'filters' and 'special effects' which can be applied to a drawing, such as blurring, fading, and making the picture look as though it was drawn in chalk on pavement. These are available through the 'Magic' tool in Tux Paint. Starting with version 0.9.18, Tux Paint's 'Magic' tools are built as plugins that are loaded at runtime and use a C API specifically for creating such tools.

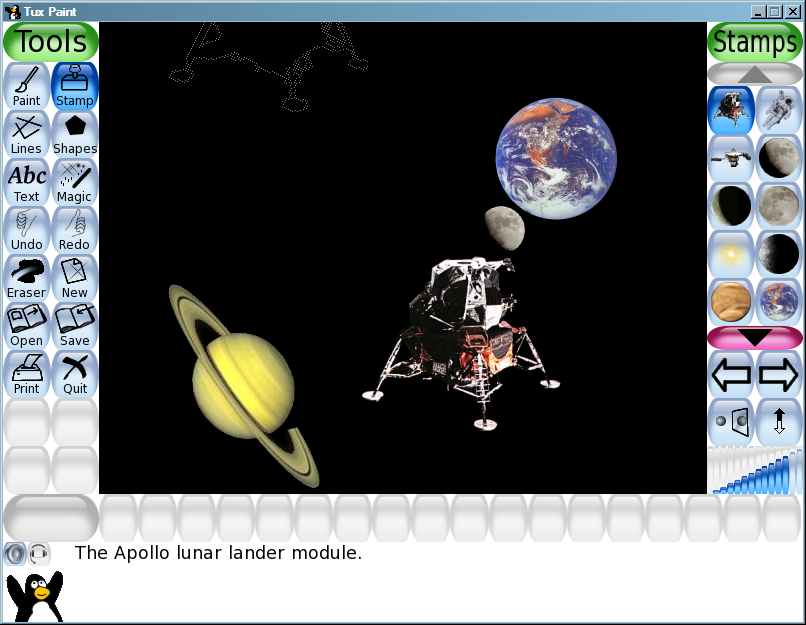
A space scene using Tux Paint Rubber Stamps

A large collection of artwork and photographic imagery are also available (under a license allowing free redistribution), and may be placed inside drawings using Tux Paint's "Rubber Stamp" tool. Stamps can be in either raster (bitmap) format (in PNG format, supporting 24bpp and full alpha transparency), or as vector graphics (in SVG format) on many platforms Tux Paint supports. As of mid-2008, over 800 stamps are included in the stamps collection.

=== Parental and teacher controls ===
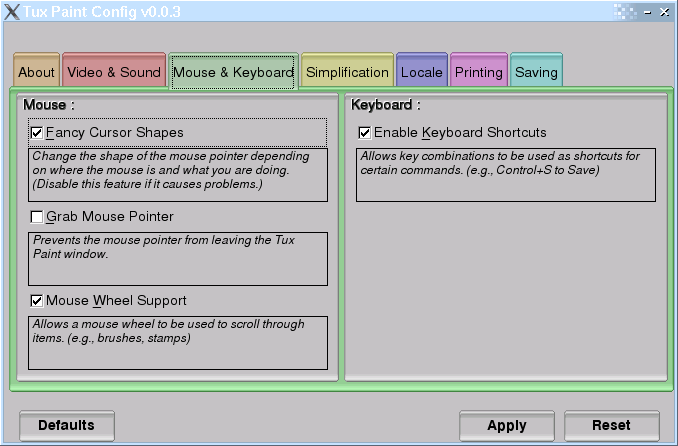
Tux Paint Config., a graphical configuration tool for Tux Paint

As features are added to Tux Paint, configuration options have been added that allow parents and teachers to disable features and alter the behavior to better suit their children's or students' needs, or to better integrate the software in their home or school computing environment. Typical options, such as enabling or disabling sound effects and full-screen mode are available. There are also options that help make Tux Paint suitable for younger or disabled children, such as displaying text using only uppercase letters or ignoring the distinction between buttons on the mouse.

=== Localization ===
Tux Paint has been translated into numerous languages, and has support for the display of text in languages that use non-Latin character sets, such as Japanese, Greek, or Telugu. As of November 2021, 130 languages are supported. Correct support for complex languages requires Pango. Sound effects and descriptive sounds for stamp imagery can also be localized. Tux Paint includes its own form of input method support, allowing entry of non-Latin characters using the 'Text' tool. Japanese (Romanized Hiragana and Romanized Katakana), Korean (Hangul 2-bul) and Traditional Chinese are currently supported.

=== Accessibility ===
Tux Paint offers built-in accessibility features, including an on-screen keyboard for use with the text entry tools, keyboard and joystick/gamepad control of the pointer, options to increase the size of UI elements (useful for coarse assistive technology, such as eye gaze trackers), and an option to play sounds monaurally.

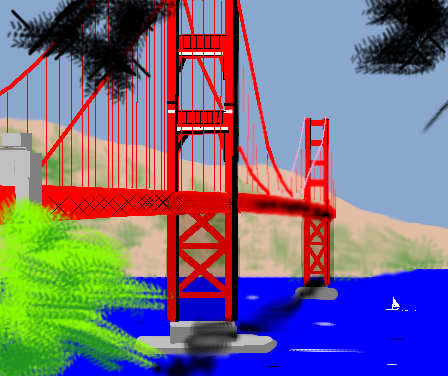
"Golden Gate Bridge", drawn using Tux Paint

== See also ==
- GCompris
- List of raster graphics editors
- Comparison of raster graphics editors
- Tux Typing
- Tux, of Math Command
- MyPaint
