= SkyRadar =

European research and development company

- Company type: European Joint Venture
- Founded: 2008
- Headquarters: Mertert, Luxembourg;
- Key people: Dr. Ulrich Scholten (founder)
- Products: Radar training hardware and simulators, radar knowledge portal
- Website: www.SkyRadar.com

SkyRadar is a European research and development company for radar technology and aviation security. It manufactures radar hardware and simulators for training, education and research. It was founded in 2008 as a joint venture of several European participants. The team is conducting active research embedded in several international research programs and operates a not for profit knowledge portal, providing e-Learning and academic publications.

== History ==
SkyRadar started in 2008 with the objective to make fully operational radar systems suitable for training and education purposes, responding to technical, budgetary and pedagogical requirements. It started with the assignment to disseminate research results gained in the frame of the Strategic Value Net project in cooperation with SAP Research and Karlsruhe Institute of Technology, funded in the frame of the 6th framework by the European Union. The founders experimented on close-range and low radiation radars. The first operational radars were produced in October 2008, including A-Scope and B-Scope functionality. PPI-scope functionality was added in 2009, as well as main filter functions like STC. To gain more flexibility scope of manoeuvre for pedagogical optimization, the team decoupled radars and scopes. In the solutions from 2013 onwards, low radiation radars send Q/I signals as message to browser enabled scopes, allowing students to operate scopes, filters or ampliers independently. Since 2014, a message-queue based server allows to connect high numbers of concurrent users. In the same year, SkyRadar went live with a knowledge portal, offering e-learning and providing access to recent academic publications on the subject. Since 2014, core functionalities of the technology behind SkyRadar's primary surveillance radar have been patented through the European Patent Office and the United States Patent and Trademark Office.

== Research ==
The SkyRadar products, namely primary surveillance and secondary surveillance radars and simulators are a result of various research programs, conducted in cooperation with German and European Universities. The modularity and message-queue structure of the radar's control and visualization were developed in the frame of the Strategic Value Net project at Karlsruhe Institute of Technology The simulators are based on a cloud-based architecture. Goal is to use Web technology to virtualize complex processes and to make them available in an economic and scalable way. Current research focuses the integration of simulated and real-time data into a holistic image. In ongoing research with Goethe University Frankfurt am Main and Würzburg University the team broadens the findings into a general service theory.

== Knowledge portal ==
In the knowledge portal, SkyRadar gives access to software, e-Learning and academic publications related to radar technology. The e-Learning content has been developed and deployed in cooperation with the Fraunhofer Institute IOSB. The research section provides academic publications and case studies on radar research published during the recent 3 years, including subjects such as data mining, drone detection, fast Fourrier, or linked open data in air traffic management.
