= Syntorial =

- Original author(s): Joe Hanley
- Developer(s): Audible Genius
- Initial release: August 27, 2013; 11 years ago
- Stable release: 1.6.1 / August 4, 2015; 9 years ago
- Written in: JUCE
- Operating system: Microsoft Windows, macOS, iPad
- Size: 1 GB
- Available in: English
- Type: Educational software synthesizer
- Website: syntorial.com

Syntorial is a synthesizer-teaching software created by Audible Genius, a company owned by website programmer, musician and teacher Joe Hanley. He was inspired to make the program by his frustration of learning synthesis in his early career, and wanted to create something that would train the user to design a patch by ear. Kickstarter-funded in 2012, the program was officially released for Microsoft Windows and OS X on August 27, 2013, and for the iPad on June 25, 2015. The synth that is built into the software is called Primer, which was released as a VST and AU in November 2013. Syntorial garnered critical acclaim with reviewers praising it a fun way to learn synthesis, earning an Editors’ Choice Award from Electronic Musician in 2014. The latest version of Syntorial is 2.0, which was released in July, 2023.

== Features ==
Syntorial includes a total of 199 lessons and 129 interactive challenges, where the user programs sounds using a built-in synth called Primer. Each lesson starts with a video lecture teaching a control or a group of controls, followed by a challenge; a patch is heard, but the user is not shown how the patch is programmed, so that they can try to program the patch to sound like the hidden patch. After the user is done programming the sound, they will submit the patch to the program, with the user shown what controls they used correctly and what controls they used incorrectly. Once the user corrects the mistakes, they can try the challenge again or move on to the next lesson. As the user progresses, more controls are added in each topic. A total of 39 quizzes are included in-between lessons. Once the user finishes all the lessons, they will have programmed 706 patches.

Syntorial uses controls and features that are the most common in many synthesizers, including subtractive synthesis, three oscillators, saw, pulse, triangle and sine waves, an FM parameter, noise oscillator, oscillator sync, band-pass filter with resonance and key tracking, ADSR envelopes, an AD modulation envelope, LFO, monophonic and polyphonic voice modes, portamento, unison with voice, detune and spread controls, ring modulation, distortion, chorus, phaser, delay, reverb, mod wheel, pitch wheel and velocity.

== Development ==
A 2003 graduate of the Berklee College of Music, Joe Hanley had been a professional musician for 17 years, a teacher for nine years, and a composer for six years before he began work on Syntorial. He was inspired to make Syntorial based on his struggles of learning musical synthesis:

"I've been a gigging keyboardist and a producer for many years and as I honed the many skills involved in these activites [sic], when it came time to use a synth. I was either spending a lot of time browsing through presets, or a lot of time tweaking knobs in a trial-and-error fashion. Despite the fact that I intellectually understood what most of the controls did, I still felt like I was at the mercy of whatever synth was in front of me. It occurred to me that what I needed was in-depth ear training involving synth-based sound design. I went looking for a product like this, it didn't exist, so I made Syntorial."

After making the prototype, Hanley held crowd-funding for Syntorial on Kickstarter from August 23 to September 22, 2012. The campaign garnered $8,614, succeeding its $5,500 goal. The money was used for hiring graphic and web designers, for buying JUCE and other development-related programs and paying for some startup business-related expenses. Hanley said on the main page for the campaign that he was planning to finish the program by March 2013. A beta was released on June 15, 2013, and the first official version of Syntorial came out on August 27. The day after Syntorial's first official release, Hanley announced that he was in the works of the VST and AU versions of Primer. A beta of the VST and AU was released on October 14, 2013, and the official first versions was distributed on November 5, 2013.

Version 1.2 of Syntorial was released on September 25, 2013, added 50 presets to the synth and the ability to save user files, significantly tweaked the scoring system and lowered the audio response level, among minor bug fixes. It was also announced by Hanley that day that all the presets in Primer would be created for other software synths, including Analog by Ableton, Logic Pro's ES2, Thor from Reason, Wasp XT included in FL Studio, and Tal-Noisemaker. The program was updated to 1.3.1 on February 28, 2014, with the ability to skip lessons and modifications to several patches to get rid of "buried" parameters. Primer was also updated to 1.1 that day, adding a MIDI control mapping feature for customization of the interface. A pack of 37 additional video lessons totaling three hours and 17 minutes, titled the Z3TA+ 2 Lesson Pack, was released on May 30, 2014. On July 22, another pack of lessons, titled the Minimoog Voyager Lesson Pack, was issued, with 34 more videos totaling two hours and 22 minutes. Version 1.5.1 of Syntorial was released on October 15, 2014, which added the ability to save progress in-between a challenge, adjust the audio response volume, share challenge results on Twitter and Facebook directly from the software, and overhaul the scoring system. Many tweaks were also made to the reply system in this version. On June 25, 2015, Syntorial was released for the iPad. The current version of Syntorial, as of August 4, 2015, is 1.6.1, new features including a hint button for group challenges and saving "favorite patches" during challenges.

== Critical reception ==
Syntorial was met with critical acclaim upon release, with many reviewers praising it as the most enjoyable way of learning a synthesizer. Tom Brislin headlined in his review for Keyboard magazine that it was "The Most Fun Way To Learn Synth Programming". He did, however, dislike the limited amount of polyphonic voices of the Primer synth. The magazine MusicTech scored it a ten out of ten, giving it the labels of "excellence" and "innovation" and calling it “The best training in synth sound-design we’ve come across." It got a 2014 Electronic Musician Editors’ Choice Award, with the magazine calling it "too cool for school".
