= Synap =

Flashcard software

- Formerly: MyCQs
- Type: Private Company
- Industry: Education Applications
- Founded: October 2015
- Founders: James Gupta & Omair Vaiyani
- Headquarters: Leeds, United Kingdom
- Area served: Worldwide
- Key people: James Gupta (CEO); Omair Vaiyani (CTO)
- Number of employees: 14
- Parent: Synap Learning Ltd
- Website: synap.ac

Synap is a British educational technology company that provides secure online exam delivery and learning tools. Founded in 2015 as a spaced repetition flashcard app, the platform has since evolved into an assessment system used by universities and professional bodies for high-stakes online exams.

== History ==
Synap was co-founded in 2014 by Dr James Gupta and Dr Omair Vaiyani, graduates of Leeds Medical School. Originally named MyCQs, the platform launched as a web and iOS application aimed at UK medical students. It allowed users to create and share crowdsourced multiple choice quizzes, employing spaced repetition principles similar to Anki.

During Synap's early years, co-founder James Gupta briefly worked as Chief Technology Officer at JumpIn, a student taxi-booking app later acquired by Addison Lee in 2014.

In 2014, the project received funding and mentorship from Jisc’s Summer of Student Innovation programme, as well as a University of Leeds enterprise scholarship and bootcamp support. These initiatives helped advance Synap’s adaptive learning algorithms, later discussed by Gupta in The Huffington Post.

The company rebranded as Synap in late 2015 following a successful equity crowdfunding campaign on Crowdcube. James and Omair completed their medical degrees in 2017 and subsequently focused full-time on Synap, expanding the team in Leeds.

In 2019, Synap entered an exclusive partnership with The University of Law (ULaw) to deliver adaptive practice and assessment for the new Solicitors Qualifying Examination (SQE 1). The agreement gave all ULaw students access to Synap as part of their study programme, with the aim of improving outcomes through personalised practice.

During the COVID-19 pandemic in 2020, Synap expanded its secure online exam delivery in response to rising demand for remote assessment.

In 2023, the company launched Synoptic, an in-house online proctoring system. Within six months it had monitored more than 1,000 exams, addressing the need for secure large-scale assessment.

== Infrastructure ==
Synap was originally developed on Facebook's Parse platform. In January 2016, Facebook announced that Parse would be closing down, and advised developers to migrate their apps to other services. As of March 2016, Synap has been hosted on Amazon Web Services, using the newly open-sourced Parse Server, which itself uses Node.js. The website is developed in Ember.js, and uses a MongoDB database, making Synap an example of full-stack JavaScript development.

== Recognition ==
Synap has been featured in The Oxford Public Health Magazine.

In December 2015, Synap was listed as one of 10 British AI companies to look out for by Business Insider.

Synap was a runner-up for ‘EdTech of the Year’ at the 2021 British Data Awards.

It was later selected as a finalist for 'Innovation of the Year' and 'Education Initiative of the Year' at the 2024 British Data Awards.

== Products and services ==
Synap offers a comprehensive suite of educational tools and services:

- Online Exams: Enables educators to create and administer secure online exams through the platform.
- Synoptic: In-house proctoring tool offering features such as intermittent webcam snapshots, screen replay, and automatic breach detection, designed to ensure exam integrity in remote settings.
- Online Course Delivery: Supports development and delivery of online courses and assignments with built-in authoring tools.
- Spaced Repetition Learning System: Utilises advanced algorithms to optimise learning efficiency.
- Personalised Learning: Tailors learning experiences based on user performance and preferences.
- Educational Analytics: Provides insights into learning progress and identifies areas for improvement.

== See also ==
- Spaced repetition
- Metacognition
- Educational psychology
- Educational technology
- Electronic assessment
- Proctor
