= Algebrator =

- Algebrator 4.2 under Windows 7
- Developer: SoftMath
- Stable release: 4.2 / 2009; 17 years ago
- Type: computer algebra system
- Website: softmath.com

Algebrator (also called Softmath) is a computer algebra system (CAS), originally known as Edusym and developed beginning in 1988. This is a CAS specifically geared towards algebra education. Beside the computation results, it shows step by step the solution process and context sensitive explanations.

== See also ==
- List of computer algebra systems
