= MobyMax =

Educational technology website

- Type: Private
- Industry: Educational technology
- Founded: 2010; 16 years ago
- Founder: Glynn Willett; Wade Willett
- Headquarters: Pittsburgh, Pennsylvania
- Products: Mathematics; Early Reading; Reading; Phonics; Language; Writing; Science; Social Studies; State Test Prep
- Website: www.mobymax.com

MobyMax is an American education technology program and company. It is designed for use in students in grades K–8. MobyMax includes 27 subjects. The program provides classroom tools such as assessments and progress monitoring for teachers and games and contests for students.

In 2017, MobyMax was used by 82% of K-8 schools in the United States, with 22 million students registered by teachers.

== History ==
MobyMax was founded in 2010 by Glynn Willett and his son, Wade Willett. Glynn previously co-founded ATX, a tax preparation software company. MobyMax was originally intended to find and fix skill gaps in special education students' learning but has also been utilized in other classes. The company expanded the program in 2013 to include Language, Reading, and Vocabulary.

In 2015, MobyMax released a science education product called Cognitive Skills Science. That same year, the company launched a trio of Early Reading modules, followed by Cognitive Skill Social Studies and seven early phonics modules in 2016.

In 2018, MobyMax released an educational assessment product. MobyMax conducted an internal, non-peer-reviewed study in 2018 with 4,000 students about classroom use of MobyMax.

In 2020, the company updated its software to help parents with homeschooling in response to the COVID-19 pandemic.

== Reception ==
In 2016, the Software and Information Industry Association (SIIA) named MobyMax a Best Science Instructional Solution finalist. The next year SIIA named MobyMax the Best PreK/Early Childhood Learning Solution and Best Education Cloud-Based Solution.
