= Delta Drawing =

Delta Drawing Learning Program
- Developer(s): Computer Access Corporation; Power Industries LP
- Initial release: 1983; 42 years ago
- Stable release: 4.3 / 1993; 32 years ago
- Platform: Apple II, Atari 8-bit, Commodore 64, VIC-20, MS-DOS
- Available in: English, Spanish
- Type: Turtle graphics

Delta Drawing Learning Program, later retitled Delta Drawing Today, is a turtle graphics drawing program developed by Computer Access Corporation, and published by Spinnaker Software in 1983.

Delta Drawing was intended for children age 4 to 14. It features a functional programming language for executing scripted drawing and painting instructions. Spinnaker sought to improve on the educational value of Logo, an earlier educational programming language that could also program turtle graphics.

Power Industries LP of Newton, Massachusetts later acquired Delta Drawing Learning Program and continued its development. They released the new version, Delta Drawing Today v4.0, in 1990, and eventually a Spanish-language edition: Delta Drawing Today Version Español.

== See also ==
- KTurtle
- NetLogo

== Links ==
- - Delta Drawing Learning Program Manual (Atari 400/800/XL)
