= The Armchair Historian =

American YouTuber

- Born: Griffin Johnsen

YouTube information
- Channels: The Armchair Historian; Behind the Armchair; Armchair Interactive
- Years active: 2016–present
- Genre: History
- Subscribers: 2.54 million (The Armchair Historian); 17.1 thousand (Behind the Armchair); 40.9 thousand (Armchair Interactive)
- Views: 8.43 million (The Armchair Historian); 0 (Behind the Armchair); 638 thousand (Armchair Interactive)
- Last updated: November 2nd, 2026
- Website: https://armchairhistory.tv/

The Armchair Historian is an American production company founded by American YouTuber Griffin Johnsen. The company is known for producing documentaries about armed conflicts on YouTube, in an animated format. Johnsen's animated history content has been used in the Marine Corps Times and highlighted in Forbes.

== History ==
Johnsen created The Armchair Historian in 2016 while still in high school. Later, he created Armchair History TV to avoid self-censoring videos, particularly after repeated challenges with YouTube's demonetization policies lead to Johnsen taking a break from content production in 2019.

The company later expanded to include the game development studio Armchair History Interactive, which developed and released in 2023 the videogame Fire & Maneuver, set in the Victorian era, as well as the videogame Master of Command, set during the Seven Years' War, released in 2025.

In 2025 Griffin Johnsen decided to halt production of new videos at the end of 2025, though explicitly stating this was not in response to monetization challenges on YouTube. Johnsen subsequently stated that retiring the channel was in response to his greater interest in game development, and that he chose to leave YouTube while successful instead of chasing shifts for audience engagement on the platform.

== Personal life ==
Johnsen's grandfather fought in World War II.
