= Ozzie (series) =

- CD cover of Ozzie's World
- Genre: Educational
- Developer: Digital Impact
- Publisher: MicroMedia Publishers Inc. (Kid Bytes)
- Creator: Louise Short
- Platforms: Windows, Macintosh
- First release: Ozzie's World; 1994
- Spin-offs: Ozzie's Travels

Ozzie is a series of children's educational games developed by Tulsa, Oklahoma studio Digital Impact. They all star Ozzie S. Otter (voiced by Danny Harwell), a curious and imaginative young 7-year-old orphaned sea otter pup who serves as the series' main protagonist. The games focus on teaching children science and ecology in different environments. They also include several activities, stories, mini games and experiments to try out.

== Design ==
=== Development ===
Ozzie was created by Digital Impact during the increase in children's educational software in 1993. The concept for the Ozzie series was based on Kathryn Sheehan and Mary Waidner's book Earth Child. After acquiring the rights to the book, Digital Impact created Ozzie's World. Ozzie's World was also translated into 14 different languages, including European Spanish, French (Emme Interactive), Arabic (Sakhr's Ozzie's World), Brazilian Portuguese (MPO Video), and Chinese (Kingstar Media).

Digital Impact's choice of mascot was a kid sea otter named Ozzie S. Otter, being an endangered species to fit with the subject of ecology. Ozzie was designed to appeal to young users with his energetic, playful personality.

Digital Impact expanded the franchise with a spin-off series titled Ozzie's Travels. They released three of those products that covered the cultures of Mexico, Japan and India. They intended introduce more titles for the cultures of Norway, Switzerland, Africa, Australia and a number of others, but those products never reached completion. The products each include five different games with cultural lessons and educational messages.

=== Art ===
Digital Impact began the Ozzie series with just one animator and two illustrators to create their first product. When the Ozzie's Travels began, they hired six additional artists, who used traditional cell animation with some inspirations from Disney. All animation frames were drawn on paper and then scanned to retain quality in the computer animation.

=== Educational goals ===
The game was leaned towards the education genre and not edutainment, teaching about the world people live in without computer orientation. The use of audio and graphics is mean to keeps kindergarten group users amused and educated. Scientific experiments and facts are clearly explained. The interface is meant to be easy to navigate and gives users the opportunity to explore and interact. The games incorporate a mix of math, problem solving, memory games, ecology, reading development, general science and experiments to teach a variety of material.

== Games ==
=== Main series ===
- Ozzie's World (1994)
  - The Otter's Adventure (1995)
  - Ozzie's World - Deluxe Edition (1995)
  - Fun School Special: Young Scientist (1995)
- Ozzie's Travels First Grand Tour (May 20, 1996)
  - Ozzie's Travels Destination Japan
  - Ozzie's Travels Destination Mexico
  - Ozzie's Travels Destination India
- Ozzie's Science (August 20, 1996)

=== Demos ===
- Ozzie's Funtime Garden (1995)
- Ozzie's World - My House (1996)
- Ozzie Explores the Forest (1996), also known as Ozzie's Forest
- Ozzie's Day at the Beach (1996)
- Ozzie's Playroom (1996)
- Ozzie Visits the Vet's Office (1996)

=== Availability ===
- Byron Preiss's BABY-ROM - Ozzie's Travels Destination Mexico

== Reception ==
=== Critical reception ===
MacAddict rated Ozzie's Science as Spiffy, praising the audio and humor, while criticizing the interface. MacUser scored Ozzie's Travels Destination Mexico 3 out of 5 stars, finding it entertaining and easy to learn from, but also a bit stereotype and the activities uneven. CD-ROM Today found the products had balanced teaching and fun. FamilyPC positively highlighted the surprises that the products had.

=== Commercial performance ===
Digital Impact sold the Ozzie products for lower prices than other state-of-the art multimedia markets, which resulted in successful sales, thanks to the lower prices of CD-ROMs. Digital Impact made an affiliation with Trees for Life and bundling copies of Ozzie's World - Deluxe Edition with seeds to increase environmental awareness.

=== Awards and nominations ===
Year	Nominee / work	Award	Result
1994	Ozzie's World	Family PC’s Top Product of the Year	Won
1997	Ozzie's World Deluxe	Newsweek Editor's Choice Award	Won
