= Software4Students =

Online program mainly in UK region

Software4Students is an online program that provides academic software from leading software manufacturers to students. The program has been running since 2006 in the UK and Ireland. Full software versions from software companies such as Microsoft, Kaspersky and Adobe are available for students at discounted prices. Software4Students is one of the largest programs for supplying discounted software to school and college students, teachers, and parents in the UK. Software4Students is a Microsoft Education Large Account Reseller.

== History ==
Software4Students was launched in the UK and Ireland in 2006. The Software4Students program started solely helping disadvantaged schools. Due to its success in helping bridge the digital divide, the Software4Students program is now available to all students, their parents, and teachers in the United Kingdom. Students can now access the software at an affordable price for use in the classroom and at home while teachers can also avail of this offer.

It has partnered with academic institutions to enable students to access academic pricing on software. Partners listed on the website include NAACE the NUS, EduServ, C2K and the NCTE.

In 2008, Microsoft launched the Dreamspark program, enabling students to access free design and development software for free. Software4Students worked with Microsoft to bring this to students and was used by Microsoft in Ireland to verify students in Irish colleges.

In April 2011, a German version of the program was launched.

The program has been featured in several mainstream publications such as The Guardian highlighting the positive impact it is having for students.

== Eligibility ==
Students can obtain full version products under academic licensing rules. The software is available to anyone in full-time education. Parents or Guardians can purchase on behalf of a student but the student remains the license holder. Students can choose between download or media versions depending on the product range.
