= Swamp Gas Visits the United States of America =

1990 video game

- Developer(s): Inline Design
- Publisher(s): Inline Design
- Platform(s): Macintosh; Windows 3.1x
- Release: 1990

Swamp Gas Visits the United States of America is a computer game developed by Inline Design in 1990 for the Macintosh and Windows 3.1x. A sequel - Swamp Gas Visits Europe - was released in 1992.

Swamp Gas Visits Europe is the sequel to the game.

== Plot ==
Swamp Gas Visits the United States of America is an educational game for up to four players, designed to help students with United States geography. The main character is an alien that leaves the mothership to hover in his UFO far above the map of U.S. as he flies around the country. The player is quizzed about the name and capital of every state which the alien hovers above, and entering the correct information allows the player into the Alien Arcade. The players select missions from a pop-up menu. Sometimes the mothership will malfunction at a location, so the alien must deal with a Close Encounter by answering a multiple-choice question about the current location.

== Reception ==
The game was reviewed in 1992 in Dragon #178 by Hartley, Patricia, and Kirk Lesser in "The Role of Computers" column. The reviewers gave the game 5 out of 5 stars.
