= Easy Languages (YouTube) =

YouTube channel

Easy Languages is a language learning network that produces subtitled street interviews to teach more than 40 languages using unscripted speech from local speakers.

== History ==
The project began in 2005 in Münster, Germany, when media educator Janusz Hamerski led a school video workshop and, with participant Cari Schmid, produced a video teaching German greetings, which was uploaded to YouTube soon after the platform's launch. In 2014, YouTube selected Easy German for its creator program, and Hamerski and Schmid moved to Berlin to expand the project. By 2021 the network included more than a dozen channels in different languages using the same interview format.

== Format ==
The project has expanded into more than 40 languages, with each channel presenting street interviews subtitled in both the local language and English. A franchise system allows new contributors to launch channels while maintaining the network's format. Many franchises offer membership tiers granting access to exclusive content.

Easy Languages partners with the German-language education company Seedlang, and several Easy Languages employees produce content for Seedlang's apps.

German mainstream press has covered the project's accessibility. In 2023, the German government's public diplomacy platform cited Easy German as an example of online German instruction.
