= Maths Pathway =

Australian online educational website

Maths Pathway is an online educational website based in Melbourne, used in Australian schools to teach mathematics. It differs from traditional mathematics, as it is set up in a modular format, with students working on individual pieces of learning on a computer and worksheet. These tests are read on a laptop, and written on paper.

== History ==
Maths Pathway was created in 2015 by Richard Wilson and Justin Matthys, who were concerned about a student decline in mathematics skills. The development started as a small website headquartered in a shed in Matthys' lawn. According to the website, it is featured in over 250 schools and used by 57,000 students.

== Features ==
Maths Pathway uses a modular format where students select their work based on what proficiency level they are at, as opposed to every student completing the same tasks. Students are then required to be tested on what they have learned every fortnight. To use Maths Pathway, schools must pay a hefty fee for each student.

== Criticism ==
Maths Pathway has been criticised for the ease at which students can cheat, doable by simply clicking to check your answer or waiting a while after switching the format to PDF, leading to students not learning the modules that the software believes that they have learnt. At the beginning of 2023, in an effort to stop cheating, Maths Pathway launched a large update, which added Entrance Tickets, to review maths before you learn it, Exit Tickets, to prove that you learnt the module, and added a timer requiring questions to be answered after 5 seconds, to "ensure" that the student writes down their working, however this does not work as well as thought, as the student can still skip through modules, just slower.
