= Betty's Brain =

Software environment created at Vanderbilt University

Betty's Brain is a software environment created at Vanderbilt University by the Teachable Agents Group to help promote students' understanding of metacognitive skills and to help middle school students learn science curriculum units, such as pond ecosystems, climate change, and human body thermoregulation. It is a qualitative reasoning system, using a node-link causal structure with concepts as nodes and links between concepts representing causal relations. These causal models help middle school students construct and reason with complex scientific models.

The system specifically focuses on reinforcing so called self-regulated learning (SRL) skills that promote both self monitoring and self assessment as one might expect of an independent learner.

The system focuses around a main character, Betty, who has asked the students to teach her about a scientific process. In this way Betty's Brain diverges from a classic intelligent tutoring system (ITS) and adopts the learning by teaching (LBT) paradigm where computer agent interactions are focused around completing a primary task unrelated to the acquisition of domain content knowledge.

More recently, Betty's level of artificial intelligence has been largely modified to increase the interactivity with the students. Betty's task is to interact with students as a "good" learner, one who has self-regulatory skills, might. By incorporating feedback related to these self-regulatory skills we have shown that students are better able to perform in future learning tasks.

Current studies are focused on the 5th grade classroom with approximately 100 students. As well, as of July 2007, the system is being developed to integrate directly into classroom curriculum for the coming semester with included tools such as Front of the Class Betty, developed at Stanford University.

As of 2018 it has been used in many experiments to test the effectiveness of building and examining dynamic models for instruction in scientific domains. In several studies of Betty’s Brain by Biswas and collaborators, they trained students by having them create models of the oxygen cycle in a water-based ecosystem and then assessed them by having them create models of the nitrogen cycle in a land-based ecosystem. This is called a transfer test and it is a standard technique in learning experiments. In both activities, the systems were presented with resources and the modeling language was the qualitative diagram language built into the system. Experimental controls tested various hypotheses to begin to determine what worked and what did not. This is a powerful environment for beginning to understand what is effective about building simulations. Other useful systems for studying the effects of modelling for learning are IQON and Colab.

== external URLs ==
https://web.archive.org/web/20110706031533/http://www.vanderbilt.edu/magazines/vanderbilt-magazine/2008/03/bettys_brain_motivates_learning/
