= Kid Pix =

Bitmap drawing program designed for children

- Kid Pix 1.0 "about" screen. Above: the Kid Pix Studio Deluxe icon.
- Original author: Craig Hickman
- Developers: Craig Hickman (1989–1998, 2011–present); Broderbund (1991–1998, 2000); Presage Software (1994–1999); ImageBuilder Software (1994–1999); Riverdeep (2000–2004); The Learning Company (1999, 2004, 2008); Software MacKiev (2000, 2004–present)
- Release: 1989; 37 years ago
- Stable release: Kid Pix 5: The S.T.E.A.M. Edition (Mac OS, Windows, iOS)
- Operating system: Classic Mac OS, macOS, Microsoft Windows, AmigaOS, FM Towns, iOS
- Type: Bitmap graphics editor
- License: Proprietary
- Website: www.mackiev.com/kidpix/index.html

Kid Pix is a bitmap drawing program designed for children. Originally created by Craig Hickman, it was first released for the Macintosh in 1989 and subsequently published in 1991 by Broderbund. Hickman was inspired to create Kid Pix after watching his son Ben struggle with MacPaint, and thus the main idea behind its development was to create a drawing program that would be very simple to use.

The application is now owned by Software MacKiev, who had been involved in development of the Macintosh version of Kid Pix Deluxe 3 and has been the sole developer of the Kid Pix series since the initial release of Kid Pix Deluxe 3X prior to acquiring the brand from Houghton Mifflin Harcourt in October 2011. Sir Ringo Starr of The Beatles is an active fan of the program and has used it to produce art that he has since exhibited in art galleries.

== History ==
Craig Hickman was studying photography at Evergreen State College in 1972 with the aim of taking a career in fine art photography when he encountered a friend entering code into a teletype in the college's terminal room. This impressed upon Hickman a desire to learn how to program. After leaving college, he continued to write programs for his own education. By 1988, he owned an Apple Macintosh and began distributing software in the public domain.

While using MacPaint that year, his then-three-year-old son expressed a desire to use the application. Hickman noted how quickly he adapted to the use of the mouse and keyboard, but also that he inadvertently activated pop-up menus and other user interface elements. This experience encouraged Hickman to write a simple paint program for his son to use, which he also decided to make freely available.

The Color Macintosh was released before Hickman's first release of his program, which he had named Kid Pix. Encouraged by a friend to sell his software rather than give it away, Hickman began working on a commercial enhanced version of the original monochrome Kid Pix freeware release, called Kid Pix Professional, which would retail for US$25 (equivalent to $62 in 2025). An advertisement for Kid Pix Professional was bundled with Kid Pix when he released it in November 1989. By June 1990, Kid Pix Professional had been released and Hickman estimates that around 100 copies were sold in total.

Hickman sent a copy of the application to Broderbund Software in the Summer of 1990 on the encouragement of friends, and having been given details for a contact within the company. He did not anticipate the application being adopted, but received a call within a week indicating that Broderbund would like to publish it. Broderbund's release of Kid Pix was demonstrated during the MacWorld keynote in 1991 and Kid Pix 1.0 was released in March 1991 to very positive feedback. By this point Broderbund had also begun developing a version of Kid Pix for MS-DOS. Kid Pix 1.0 received several industry awards, including the 1991 MacUser Eddi for best Children's Program, the 1991 Software Publishers Association Awards for Best User Interface in a New Program and Best Early Learning Program, and the MacWorld World-Class award for Best Education Program.

The latest Mac and Windows versions of the product were developed by the current owner and publisher of Kid Pix, Software MacKiev, who had been involved in development of the Macintosh version of Kid Pix Deluxe 3 and has been the sole developer of the Kid Pix series since the initial release of Kid Pix Deluxe 3X prior to acquiring the brand from Houghton Mifflin Harcourt in October 2011. Hickman had no involvement with the development of Kid Pix from 1998 until late 2011 when he began consulting with Software MacKiev on the development of future editions.

Presage Software contributed programming to the Macintosh, Windows and Windows95 versions of KidPix Studio.

== Timeline ==
Screenshot of Kid Pix Deluxe 3X

- 1989 - Kid Pix Public Domain Version was released for free in November 1989.
- 1990 - Kid Pix Professional was released at a price of $25 (equivalent to $62 in 2025) with sound, color, the mixer tool, more stamps and bilingual menus in English and Spanish.
- Broderbund became a publisher for Kid Pix.
- March 1991 - Kid Pix 1.0 was released at a price of $59.95 (equivalent to $147.74 in 2025) with impressive sales and reviews.
- 1992 - Kid Pix Companion was released at a price of $39.95 (equivalent to $98.45 in 2025) and added new features and QuickTime videos.
- 1993 - Kid Cuts, a derivative of Kid Pix that allowed for creation of special projects, was released at a price of $59.95 (equivalent to $147.74 in 2025).
- 1994 - Kid Pix 2 distributed both Kid Pix and the Companion together.
- 1994 - Kid Pix Fun Pack added new stamps and hidden pictures.
- 1994 - Kid Pix Studio was released by Broderbund.
- 1998 - Kid Pix Studio Deluxe was released by Broderbund.
- 1999 - Kid Pix Studio Deluxe was re-released by The Learning Company a year after its acquisition of Broderbund.
- 2000 - Kid Pix Deluxe 3 was released by Broderbund.
- 2004 - Kid Pix Deluxe 4 was released by The Learning Company/Riverdeep.
- 2004 - Kid Pix Deluxe 3X (Mac OS X Edition 1.0) was released by Software MacKiev.
- 2006 - Kid Pix Deluxe 3X (Mac OS X Edition 1.1) by Software MacKiev added iPod movies export and enhanced integration with iTunes, iPhoto, iMovie and GarageBand, applications from the Apple's iLife application suite.
- 2008 - Kid Pix Deluxe 3X (Mac OS X Edition 1.2.3) by Software MacKiev fixed compatibility with a new version of QuickTime and added compatibility with Mac OS X 10.5 "Leopard".
- 2008 - Kid Pix Deluxe 4 was re-released on DVD-ROM by Houghton Mifflin Harcourt two years after Riverdeep's merge with Houghton Mifflin.
- 2010 - Kid Pix Deluxe 3D (Mac OS X Edition 2.0) by Software MacKiev is a major upgrade, with path animation, 3D characters, movie backgrounds, and video narration.
- 2011 - Kid Pix Deluxe 3D (Windows Edition) was released by Software MacKiev.
- 2018 - Kid Pix 5: The S.T.E.A.M. Edition was released by Software MacKiev.

=== Kid Pix 2 ===
Kid Pix 2 added new features to the original. These features were originally available in an add-on known as Kid Pix Companion.

"SlideShow" is a program allowing the creation of a slide show of Kid Pix images with transitions and custom recorded sounds. By setting the time delay between slides to the lowest possible setting animations can be created using multiple Kid Pix images acting as each of the frames of animation.

The "Wacky TV" allows the user to watch video clips in common media formats such as MOV or AVI. The picture can then be distorted using various buttons. The CD came with various sample clips to watch. If a movie contained sound, there was also an option to speed up the audio by 50%, or play it in reverse.

=== Kid Pix Studio ===
Kid Pix Studio offered a complement of programs to the original Kid Pix. It opened up the ability for children to create not only static images but animated creations as well.

SlideShow was extended to allow the use of any Kid Pix, Moopie, Stampimator and Digital Puppet files in the slide show.

"Moopies" is very similar to the standard Kid Pix program except with a reduced canvas size and the ability to add several animated rubber stamps and wacky brush items. Music and sounds can also be chosen to play in the background of the "moopie".

"Stampimator" is again similar to the standard Kid Pix program and "Moopies", except the animated rubber stamps can be dragged across the canvas recording a path which they would then repetitively follow.

Several pre-made computer puppets are provided in this program. The user can animate them like a real puppet including choosing facial expressions by hitting various keys on the keyboard. Sound and music, and a background can be added to go along with the movement of the puppet.

The "Moopies", "Digital Puppets", "Stampimator" and "Slideshow" creations can be saved as a standalone executable that enables them to be viewed by others regardless of them owning a copy of Kid Pix Studio. "Slideshows" also have the added possibility of being exported to a video file, although this functionality is limited to slide shows that contain only Kid Pix drawings.

The "Wacky TV" feature allowed users to watch movies and animations made in Moopies, and Slideshow, and even any movies the user may have on their computer. Several buttons are available for use in this feature, which allows users to watch the movies in several different ways, like in reverse or flipped screen. This was also available on the previous version of Kid Pix.

==== Kid Pix Studio Deluxe ====
A later version, titled Kid Pix Studio Deluxe, featured an updated picker screen and allowed editing text items after they have been placed down, which was not possible in prior versions of Kid Pix. It was also possible in this version to have the computer read the text aloud, and, exclusive to the Macintosh version, add some music to play in the background during a SlideShow.

=== Kid Pix Deluxe 3 ===
Kid Pix received a significant makeover with Kid Pix Deluxe 3. It was updated with a new 3D looking interface and new sound effects which makes it almost unrecognizable from the older versions. The only surviving new feature inherited from Kid Pix Studio was the SlideShow. This is possibly because the others were rendered unnecessary with the addition of clip art pictures and animations to the basic Kid Pix program.

Added tools include:

- Background, to select a premade background from a large library.
- Static Clip Art, a large library of premade static clip art.
- Animated Clip Art.
- Sound Tool, used to select sounds for the image from the provided library or to record custom sounds.
- Play Button, upon being clicked, the animated clip art on the page would animate, the selected sound (if any) would begin to play and text typed would be spoken by the selected voice.

=== Kid Pix Deluxe 4 ===
Kid Pix Deluxe 4 was released in 2004 and saw several improvements over Kid Pix Deluxe 3, including an updated interface whose layout is more faithful to the original Kid Pix (thus causing the canvas to be larger), the Text tool having a WYSIWYG font menu, the Idea Machine being accessible from the user interface instead of simply from the program's menu, a leaner and more organized Background library, a bilingual Undo Guy that can yap out both English and Spanish phrases, and video tutorials on how to use the program and each of its individual tools. For Macintosh users, this was the first version of Kid Pix to be compatible with Mac OS X, the last version to be compatible with the "Classic" Mac OS (in this case, Mac OS 8 and 9), and the only version to utilize Apple's Carbon API.

=== Kid Pix Deluxe 3X ===
A new version of Kid Pix Deluxe 3, which was initially released in 2004, featured Mac OS X compatibility, increased canvas size and integration with applications from the Apple's iLife application suite, such as iMovie, iTunes, iPhoto and GarageBand. Also, it features export of Kid Pix projects to iPod video format, giving kids a head start in creating their own podcasts. Further, the exploding screen eraser from the previous Kid Pix Deluxe 3 Edition was replaced with a fire hose, which was less destructive and noisy.

=== Kid Pix Deluxe 3D ===
A significant upgrade from Kid Pix Deluxe 3X, the 3D edition was published for the Mac by Software MacKiev in October 2010 and for Windows in October 2011. While retaining the features of the previous "3X" edition, Kid Pix Deluxe 3D emphasizes digital storytelling with video narration and export to YouTube. The "3D" part of the name comes from the newly added 3D animations and backgrounds, and an export to 3D feature that creates anaglyph video images that can be viewed using red/blue 3D glasses (included in the package).

=== Kid Pix 5: The S.T.E.A.M. Edition ===
Kid Pix 5: The S.T.E.A.M. Edition is the newest version of Kid Pix by Software MacKiev, available for Mac, Windows, and iPad. It is the first version to have iPad support and 64-bit compatibility, and has a new Steam age interface. Currently, it is only available as an upgrade or for educational institutions through Learning Services International.

== Features ==
Screenshot of Kid Pix Deluxe 3D

The canvas occupies most of the available screen face, and the entire canvas is visible at all times. The drawing tools available to the user are placed in a column of buttons down the left edge of the screen. Instead of using menus to access the different options that each tool has, they are displayed in a row of icons along the bottom of the screen. Selecting a new tool presents a new set of options, such as different styles for the Wacky Brush. The color palette is situated below the list of tools and consists of a collection of colored squares for each of the available colors. Files with the KPX extension can be converted to the more accessible PCX format by renaming the extension.

The drawing tools used in Kid Pix are:

- Pencil Tool, the tool that draws free lines onto the picture. Six line thicknesses are provided.
- Line Tool, used to create perfectly straight lines. Like the Pencil Tool, six line thicknesses are provided.
- Paint Bucket, used to fill an area with a solid color or pattern.
- Square Tool, used to create perfect square or rectangular shapes. Changing the line thickness in the line tool will change the thickness of the square.
- Circle Tool, similar to the Square Tool. It is used to create perfect circle or oval shapes, and the thickness can be changed using the line tool.

Kid Pix includes a selection of tools that go beyond drawing simple lines and shapes. These include:

- Wacky Brush, contains an array of options to paint various effects onto the image, such as a line of dripping paint, a line of shapes or a random leafless tree.
- Mixer Tool, provides various options to affect the entire image with distortion, blurring and fading effects. Starting from Kid Pix Deluxe 3, an example of the effects would be shown on a butterfly.
- Rubber Stamps, a collection of small icons that can be added to the picture in a way similar to the use of clip art. The original stamps were taken from the Apple Computer font Cairo. From Kid Pix Professional onwards the size of the stamp on the canvas could be enlarged. Eventually, these were transformed into 8-Bit like images that could be edited by the user.

Selection and erasing tools include:

- Erasing Tools, these provide several different ways to erase various parts, or all, of a drawing. For example, the popular stick of dynamite would cause the entire image to explode in alternating black and white concentric circles.
- Moving Truck, allows various parts of the image to be selected and moved around the canvas. There are different shapes and sizes that the selections can be, such as circles or rectangles.
- Dye Tool, used to pick out colors already used somewhere in the canvas.

Text tools include:

- Text tool, includes "rubber stamps" of the letters of the alphabet which speak the name of the letter when selected. It also includes numbers and other special characters.
- Typing tool, includes basic abilities to add text to the image in different fonts and various sizes.

Other tools include:

- Sound tool, allows recording custom sounds to add to pictures (e.g. little pug noises, with a bark at the end).
- The "Undo Guy" acts as a standard undo button, undoing the last change made to the image. When clicked, the Undo Guy says comical phrases in different voices. Starting with Kid Pix Deluxe 3D, the Undo Guy could undo and redo several times, but in all versions of Kid Pix prior to that version, the Undo Guy could only undo and redo once.
- The "Pick a Draw Me" addition (located under the 'Goodies' Section) gives three random phrases for a drawing idea. Each phrase is said by a different person to inspire the user to draw something unconventional. This feature was absent in Kid Pix Deluxe 3 and all versions that succeeded it.

== Reception ==
Reception

Award
Publication	Award
Oppenheim Toy Portfolio Award	Blue Chip Award

KidPix was given a blue chip award at the 1994 Oppenheim Toy Portfolio Awards. The judges described it as "a fun-filled multimedia art exploration program with a sense of humor" and "chockful of clever goodies that invite computer and artistic exploration", but they noted that the DOS and Mac versions were superior to the Windows version. KidPix Companion was reviewed in the Oppenheim Guide Book where it was described as a program that "make[s] a good thing better", alongside a review for KidCuts which was described as "a 21st-century evolution of an old kids' favorite" and "a springboard for off-line creative play".

All Game Guide gave Kid Pix Studio Deluxe a score of 3 out of 5.

It appeared at number 10 of PC Data's List of Top Selling Software list for February 1998.

Kid Pix Studio won the Best School Productivity/Creativity Program award in the 1995 CODiE Awards.

== See also ==
- Tux Paint
- Mario Paint
