= EMCrit =

Open access medical reference manual

EMCrit Podcast - Critical Care and Resuscitation
- Genre: Medical Research
- Format: Audio
- Language: English

Cast and voices
- Hosted by: Scott Weingart, MD FCCM

Production
- Length: approx. 20 minutes

Technical specifications
- Audio format: MP3

Publication
- Original release: March 1, 2009

Reception
- Cited for: Counts for AMA Continuing Education credits

Related
- Website: emcrit.org

Internet Book of Critical Care
- Author: Josh Farkas, MD
- Language: English
- Subject: Public health Critical care medicine
- Published: 2020
- Publisher: EMCrit
- Publication place: USA
- Media type: Online
- Website: emcrit.org/ibcc/toc/

EMCrit is an American medical collective and publishing group made up of physicians in the field of critical care and emergency medicine. The group publishes a number of digital resources to equip physicians, clinical pharmacists, nurses, paramedics and researchers. Functioning as a key component of the Free Open Access Medical Education and open access movement, and with 34,000 subscribers on Twitter and 300,000 monthly podcast downloads, it has been cited by the clinician information provider Medscape as "arguably the most popular EM–critical care-focused site".

EMCrit was founded in 2009 by Scott Weingart, MD FCCM, an intensivist in New York. He completed a surgical critical care fellowship at the Shock Trauma Center in Baltimore. He also completed an ECMO fellowship and helps teach an ECMO course in San Diego.

== Publications ==
The group is best known for their podcast, EMCrit Podcast - Critical Care and Resuscitation. A new podcast episode is published every two weeks and can be used by healthcare professionals for American Medical Association continuing education credits.

The group wrote the Resuscitation Crisis Manual, a medical manual sold by Leeuwin Press and written by 50 medical professionals. The format of the manual is based on the airline industry's cockpit QRH (quick reference handbook) and the guide uses crew resource management principles created for aviation safety to provide checklists regarding patient safety.

The group publishes the Internet Book of Critical Care (IBCC), an online medical textbook focused on topics in critical care medicine written by American physician Josh Farkas, MD, a practicing ICU doctor and attending pulmonologist at the University of Vermont.

In 2020, the IBCC added a chapter with instructions for medical professionals regarding how to treat and combat Coronavirus disease 2019, during the COVID-19 pandemic, which was soon included among recommended resources by institutions.

== See also ==
- Learning Resource Server Medicine
