= Rmetrics =

Software for teaching computational finance

- Written in: R, C/C++, Fortran
- Operating system: Cross-platform: Windows, macOS, Linux
- Platform: R programming language
- Type: Computational finance
- License: GPL
- Website: www.rmetrics.org
- Repository: r-forge.r-project.org/projects/rmetrics

Rmetrics is a free and open-source software project designed for teaching computational finance. Rmetrics is based primarily on the statistical R programming language, but does contain contributions in other programming languages, such as Fortran, C, and C++. The project was started in 2001 by Diethelm Wuertz, based at the Swiss Federal Institute of Technology in Zurich.

== Rmetrics packages ==
Most Rmetrics components are distributed as R packages, which are add-on modules for R.

== Goals ==
The broad goals of the projects are:

- To provide widespread access to a broad range of powerful statistical and graphical methods for the analysis of market data and risk management in finance.
- To provide a common software platform that enables the rapid development and deployment of extensible, scalable, and interoperable software.
- To strengthen scientific understanding by producing high-quality documentation and reproducible research.
- To train researchers on computational and statistical methods for the analysis of financial data and for financial risk management.

== R/Rmetrics project ==
Rmetrics provides a high-level interpreted language, as well as data and model visualization capabilities. It allows for research in parallel statistical computing with an object oriented framework for computational finance, and financial engineering.

== Open source commitment ==
The Rmetrics project has a commitment to full open source discipline, with distribution via a SourceForge.net-like platform. All software contributions are expected to exist under an open source license such as GPL2, Artistic 2.0, or BSD. There are many different reasons why open-source software is beneficial to a software project in finance, including:

- To provide full access to algorithms and their implementation
- To facilitate software improvements through bug fixing and software extensions
- To encourage good scientific computing and statistical practice by providing appropriate tools and instruction
- To provide a workbench of tools that allows researchers to explore and expand the methods used to analyze biological data
- To lead and encourage commercial support and development of those tools that are successful
- To promote reproducible research by providing open and accessible tools with which to carry out that research (reproducible research is distinct from independent verification)
- To encourage users to join the Rmetrics project, either by contributing Rmetrics compliant packages or documentation.

== Rmetrics Repository ==
The Rmetrics Repository is hosted by R-forge. The following developers (in alphabetical order) contribute or have contributed to the Rmetrics packages: Andrew Ellis, Christophe Dutang, David Lüthi, David Scott, Diethelm Würtz, Francesco Gochez, Juri Hinz, Marco Perlin, Martin Mächler, Maxime Debon, Petr Savicky, Philipp Erb, Pierre Chausse, Sergio Guirreri, Spencer Graves, and Yohan Chalabi.

== Resources ==
- Wuertz, Diethelm; Chalabi, Yohan; Chen, William; Ellis, Andrew (2009). Portfolio Optimization with R/Rmetrics. Finance Online Publishing. ISBN 978-3-906041-01-8.

== See also ==
- Computational finance
- R (programming language)
