= Matheass =

Software

MatheAss
- Developer: Bernd Schultheiss
- Stable release: 10.0 / August 28, 2024
- Operating system: Windows
- Available in: English, German, French
- Type: Mathematical software
- License: Shareware
- Website: eng.matheass.eu

MatheAss (former Math-Assist) is a computer program for numerical solutions in school mathematics and functions in some points similar to Microsoft Mathematics. MatheAss is common in math classes throughout Germany, and schools in the German federal state of Hessen possess a state license which allows all secondary schools to use MatheAss.

Its functionality is limited compared to other numerical programs, for example, MatheAss has no script language and does no symbolic computation. On the other side it is easy to use and offers the user fully worked out solutions, in which only the necessary quantities need to be entered. MatheAss covers the topics algebra, geometry, analysis, stochastics, and linear algebra.

After a precursor for the home computers, usual around 1980, MatheAss appeared in 1983 as a shareware version for the PC, so it was one of the first shareware programs on the German market. MatheAss is available on the manufacturer's website for download for various versions of the Windows operating system.

MatheAss offers a context-sensitive help, which was supplemented in many places by showing mathematical examples and background information. The MatheAss help file can also be viewed online.

MatheAss is freeware, which means: For private use, the program is free of charge. For use in schools or for commercial purposes, you must register.
