= Institute of Human Anatomy =

American cadaver lab and YouTube channel

YouTube information
- Channel: Institute of Human Anatomy
- Years active: 2012–present
- Genres: Biology; Education; react
- Subscribers: 8.44 million (main channel)
- Views: 1.34 billion
- Last updated: May 14, 2025
- Website: instituteofhumananatomy.com

Institute of Human Anatomy LLC (IOHA) is an American privately owned human cadaver lab. The institution is located in Salt Lake City, UT, and has both a physical classroom and an education production studio. It was founded by Jeremy Jones and Jonathan Bennion.

== Online presence ==
The Institute gained a substantial online following starting in November 2019, when they uploaded their first video to TikTok. A 2019 video, with 1.6 million likes, clarified the location of the human stomach, while a 2021 video illustrating the bodily changes caused by pregnancy accumulated over 8 million views. By November 2020, the account had 6 million followers.

The founder, Jeremy Jones, has stressed the importance of respectful content presentation due to the wide viewership and use of real human cadavers.

IOHA has 20 million subscribers and garnered over 900 million content views across various social media platforms.

== Founders ==
The institute is run by Jonathan Bennion and Jeremy Jones. Jonathan holds certification as a physician assistant and serves as the co-owner and director.
