= Ratatype =

- Available in: English, French, German, Spanish, Italian, Turkish, Polish, Ukrainian, Dutch, Portuguese languages
- Founded: 2013
- Owner: Andriy Borovyk
- Website: https://www.ratatype.ua/ https://www.ratatype.co.uk/
- Commercial: yes

Ratatype is an online platform for learning touch typing. The service offers typing lessons, typing speed tests, and speed certificates in ten languages; some features are paid.

== History ==
The site was created by the Dnipro-based company Reactor in 2013. All services on the site were initially free, with the company's revenue coming from advertising.

In 2024, paid features were introduced, including the purchase of typing-speed certificates, the option to disable advertising, and unlimited access to lessons.

In 2025, Ratatype passed into the full ownership of one of its co-founders, Andriy Borovyk.

== Features ==
- Ratatype teaches touch typing on several keyboard layouts, including QWERTY, AZERTY, Dvorak, and QWERTZ.
- A typing speed test is available in ten languages, lasting one, two, or five minutes, with a certificate issued based on the result, though the platform supports fewer languages than some competing typing trainers.
- For educational institutions, a classroom feature lets teachers track students' progress, while its practice material has been described as lacking depth for advanced learners.
- Its lesson structure and certification system have also been described in guides published by French and Spanish technology outlets.

== See also ==
- Touch typing
- Typing game
- Words per minute
