= Free Open Access Medical Education =

Collection of online resources for medicine

Free Open Access Medical Education (FOAM or FOAMed) is a dynamic collection of online resources and tools designed to promote lifelong learning in emergency medicine. The term was coined in June 2012 at the International Conference on Emergency Medicine in Dublin.

== Description ==
The FOAM movement arose in response to the broader Open Educational Resources (OER) movement, reflecting the growing demand for freely available, high-quality educational materials. It gained momentum with the rapid growth of social media and digital platforms, which revolutionised how medical information is accessed and shared.

FOAM is defined by its accessibility via online text- and media-sharing platforms and incorporates formats such as blogs, podcasts, and social media posts. More formal learning resources such as online question banks, YouTube videos, and Massive Open Online Courses (MOOCs), are also components of FOAM.

== Impact ==
FOAM is highly popular among medical students and clinicians. For example, a 2014 survey of emergency medicine residents in the state of Utah found the online audio series EM:RAP was used by some 80% of residents. The accessibility of FOAM materials is considered foundational to the wide dissemination of current medical knowledge, particularly in underserved regions. However, concerns have been raised about the lack of formal peer review and quality control over many FOAM materials. Resource creation is often geographically concentrated, potentially excluding perspectives from lower-resource regions.

== Notable FOAM resources ==
| Platform | Country of origin | Year founded | Primary Focus | Target Audience |
|---|---|---|---|---|
| Academic Life in Emergency Medicine (ALiEM) | United States | 2009 | Emergency medicine education and leadership | Emergency medicine professionals |
| CanadiEM | Canada | 2015 | Emergency medicine and critical care | Healthcare professionals and trainees |
| CapsuleRAD | India | 2016 | Radiology and allied medicine | Radiologists residents, medical students and healthcare professionals |
| Don't Forget The Bubbles | Australia | 2013 | Paediatric medicine | Paediatricians, healthcare professionals, and parents |
| EMCrit | United States | 2009 | Critical care and emergency medicine | Critical care specialists and emergency physicians |
| Life in the Fast Lane | Australia | 2007 | Emergency medicine and critical care | Global healthcare professionals |
| MedShr | United Kingdom | 2015 | Case-based learning | Medical students and healthcare professionals |
| PaediatricFOAM | Global | 2017 | Paediatrics and critical care | Healthcare providers and students |
| REBEL EM | United States | 2013 | Emergency medicine and critical care | Medical professionals |
| St. Emlyn's | United Kingdom | 2012 | Emergency medicine education | Healthcare professionals and students |
| The Resus Room | United Kingdom | 2015 | Emergency medicine and resuscitation | Healthcare professionals |

== See also ==
- Open Educational Resources
- Open Course Library
- Medical Education
