= Tux, of Math Command =

Computer math learning game

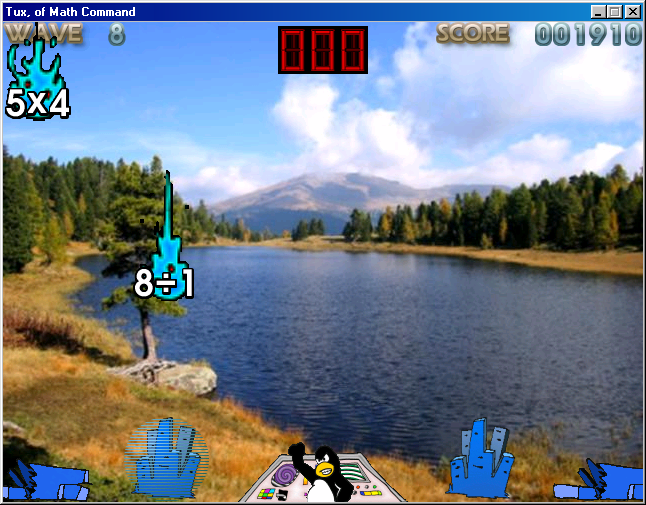
- Screenshot
- Developers: Bill Kendrick; David Bruce; Holger Levsen; Tim Holy; Sam Hart; Brendan Luchen; Jesus Mager
- Stable release: 2.0.3 / December 2, 2013; 12 years ago
- Operating system: Cross-platform
- Type: Educational game
- License: GNU General Public License
- Website: www.tux4kids.com/tuxmath.html
- Repository: github.com/tux4kids/tuxmath

Tux, of Math Command (TuxMath, for short) is an open source arcade-style video game for learning arithmetic, initially created for Linux.

== History ==
The first alpha of the game was released by its initial developer, Bill Kendrick, in September 2001. The game contains arctic theme of Tux, the Linux penguin, who stars in the game.

Since 1.7.0 the game also includes a multiplayer mode and Factor-fraction activity called Factoroids.

== Gameplay ==
The game-play mechanic is based loosely on that of the arcade game Missile Command, but with comets falling on cities, rather than missiles. Like Missile Command, players attempt to protect their cities, but rather than using a trackball-controlled targeting cross-hair, players solve math problems that label each comet, which causes a laser to destroy it.

=== Features ===
The game has multiple user support (useful for schools), LAN multiplayer mode, on-screen tutorials and a training mode - over 50 bundled lessons ranging from simple number typing up through all four basic arithmetic operations with negative numbers and "missing number" questions (e.g. "3 x ? = 12"). Being an open source project, multi-platform support for Linux, Windows, Mac OS X, BeOS and others is available. Localization to over thirty (human) languages was created by the games' community. Included is also "Factoroids", a clone of classic Atari video game Asteroids, modified to be an activity to train factorization.

== JavaScript version ==
Originally written in C language and based on the SDL library, TuxMath has been rewritten in JavaScript in 2022, allowing it to be played from a web browser or from a smartphone.

The web version of TuxMath allows playing the game where the player has to solve operations to shoot comet TuxMath, but not the "factoroid" game. It adds an "autolevel" option which adjusts the operations to the level of the player, levels with operations involving 3 numbers or more, a penalty (igloo destroyed) in the event of too many wrong answers.

== Reception and impact ==
=== Distribution ===
TuxMath is included in numerous Linux distributions, including the Edubuntu flavor of Ubuntu. It is included as a game on the ASUS Eee PC. It was also included on the Dish Network 721 PVR.

=== Use in schools ===
Numerous schools use TuxMath, and school newsletters, educational, software websites and publications mention it, often together with other open-source educational software.

== See also ==
- Tux Typing
- Tux Paint
- List of open source games
