= Wireless Philosophy =

Philosophy education website

- Website type: Educational video website
- Available in: English
- Website: www.wi-phi.com
- Launched: June 7, 2013; 13 years ago
- Current status: Online

Wireless Philosophy or Wi-Phi is an open-access philosophy website that aims to "introduce people to the practice of philosophy by making videos that are freely available in a form that is entertaining". Its founder and executive director is Gaurav Vazirani, a PhD student at Yale University. According to Mel Thompson, Wireless Philosophy is "a very good online resource for those coming new to philosophy, and for students from GCSE upwards."

== Notable contributors ==
- Elizabeth Brake
- Stephen Darwall
- Thomas Donaldson
- Julia Driver
- Sally Haslanger
- Andrew Janiak
- Monte Johnson
- Joshua Knobe
- Karen Lewis

== See also ==
- 1000-Word Philosophy
