= GCompris =

Educational entertainment software

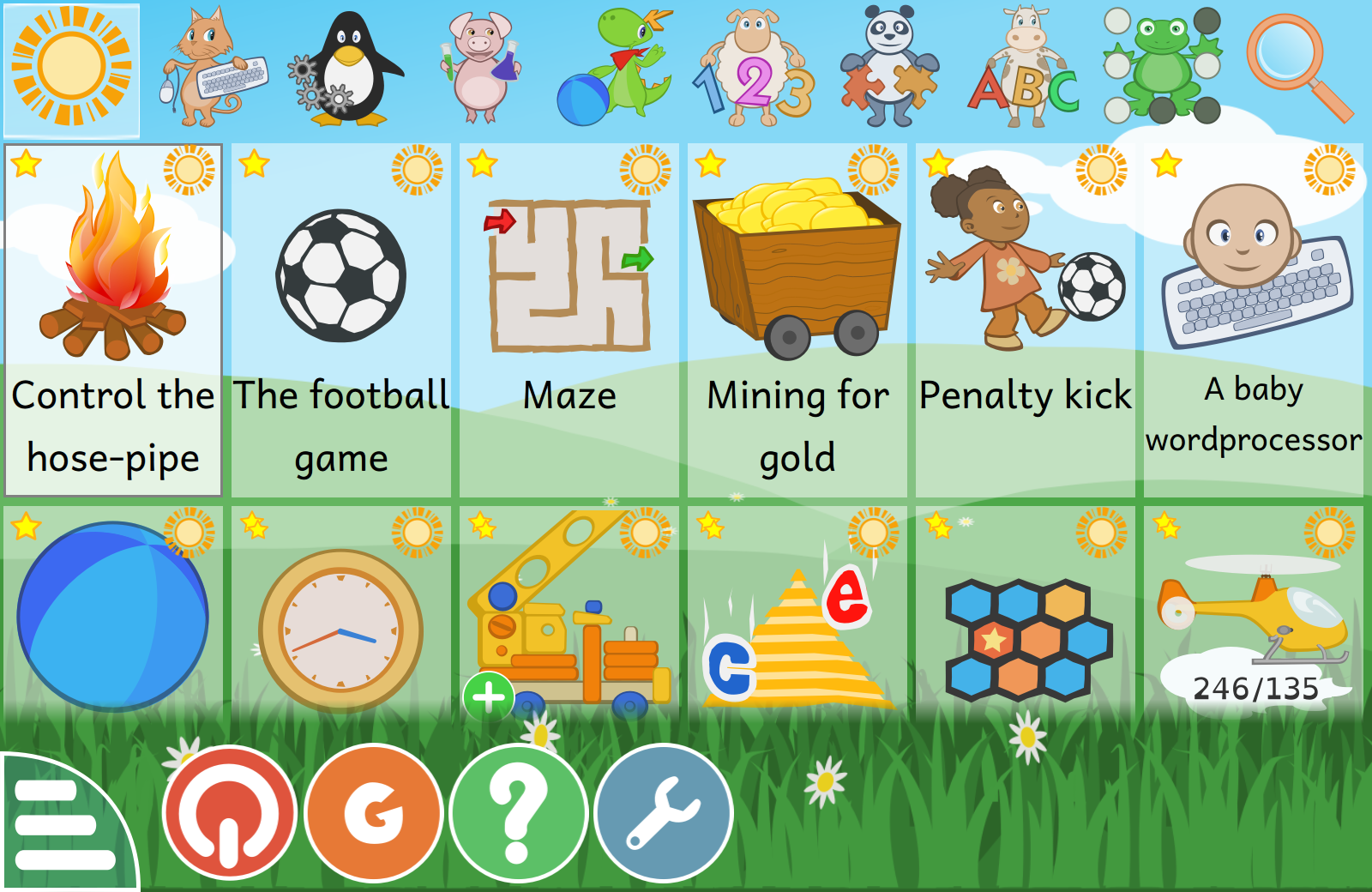
- Original author: Bruno Coudoin
- Developers: KDE, Timothée Giet and Johnny Jazeix (maintainers)
- Release: 19 June 2000; 26 years ago
- Stable release: 26.1 / 9 March 2026
- Written in: legacy: C, Python; current: C++, QML
- Operating system: Android, BSD, Linux, macOS, Microsoft Windows
- Platform: legacy: GTK+; current: Qt
- Available in: more than 50 languages
- Type: Educational entertainment, Educational software
- License: New (Qt Quick): Since 1.1: AGPL-3.0-only; 0.11 to 1.0: GPL-3.0-or-later; Legacy (GTK): 8.4 to 15.10: GPL-3.0-or-later; 0.2.2 to 8.3.12: GPL-2.0-or-later
- Website: gcompris.net
- Repository: invent.kde.org/education/gcompris.git

GCompris is a software suite comprising educational entertainment software for children aged 2 to 10. GCompris was originally written in C and Python using the GTK+ widget toolkit, but a rewrite in C++ and QML using the Qt widget toolkit has been undertaken since early 2014. GCompris is free and open-source software and the current version is subject to the requirements of the AGPL-3.0-only license. It has been part of the GNU project.

The name GCompris is a pun, in the French language is pronounced the same as the phrase "I have understood", J'ai compris [ʒekɔ̃ˈpʁi]. The G in GCompris also stood for GNU.

It is available for Linux, BSD, macOS, Windows and Android. While binaries compiled for Microsoft Windows and macOS were initially distributed with a restricted number of activities and a small fee was required to unlock all the activities, since February 2020 the full version is entirely free for all platforms.

== Extent ==
In 2024 GCompris comprised 190 games, called "activities". These are bundled into the following groups:

- Computer discovery: keyboard, mouse, different mouse gestures
- Numeracy: table memory, enumeration, double entry table, mirror images
- Science: the canal lock, the water cycle, the submarine, electric simulations
- Geography: place the country on the map
- Games: chess, memory, Connect 4, oware, sudoku
- Reading: reading practice
- Other: learn to tell time, puzzle of famous paintings, vector drawing, cartoon making

== Development history ==
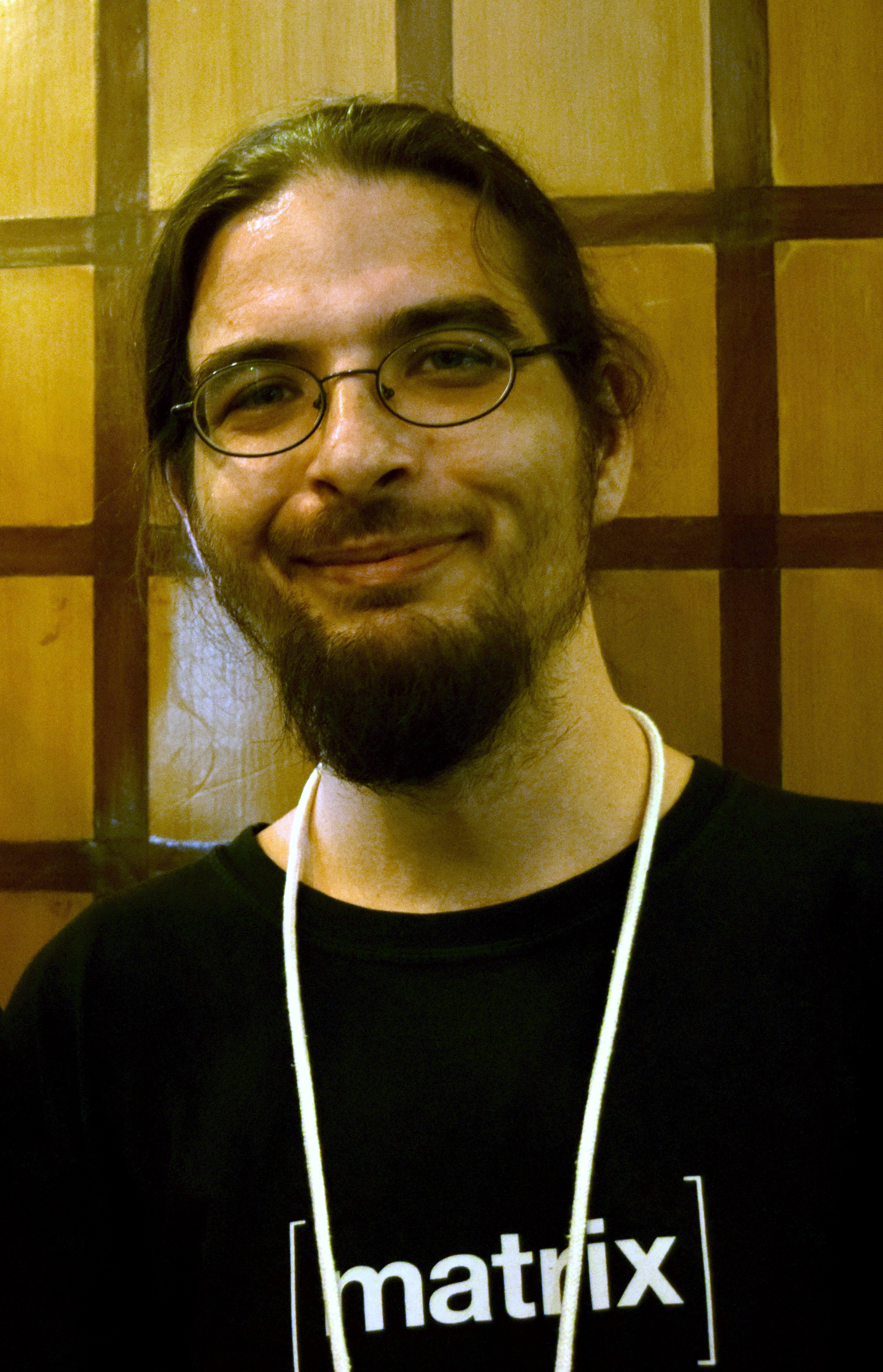
Timothée Giet, graphic artist and freelancer, currently in charge of the commercial support

The first version of the game was made in 2000 by Bruno Coudoin, a French software engineer. Since the first release it was distributed freely on the Internet and was protected by the GNU General Public License. The motivation behind the development was to provide native educational application for Linux. Since then, the software has seen continuous improvements, in terms of graphics and number of activities, thanks to the help of many developers and graphic artists joining the project over the years.

There are two branches of GCompris; with released versions in each. The first, older of which is the GTK+ branch that contains 144 activities is now considered to be a legacy branch in maintenance mode, with no new development. The latest release of the GTK+ version is 15.10 of 18 October 2015.

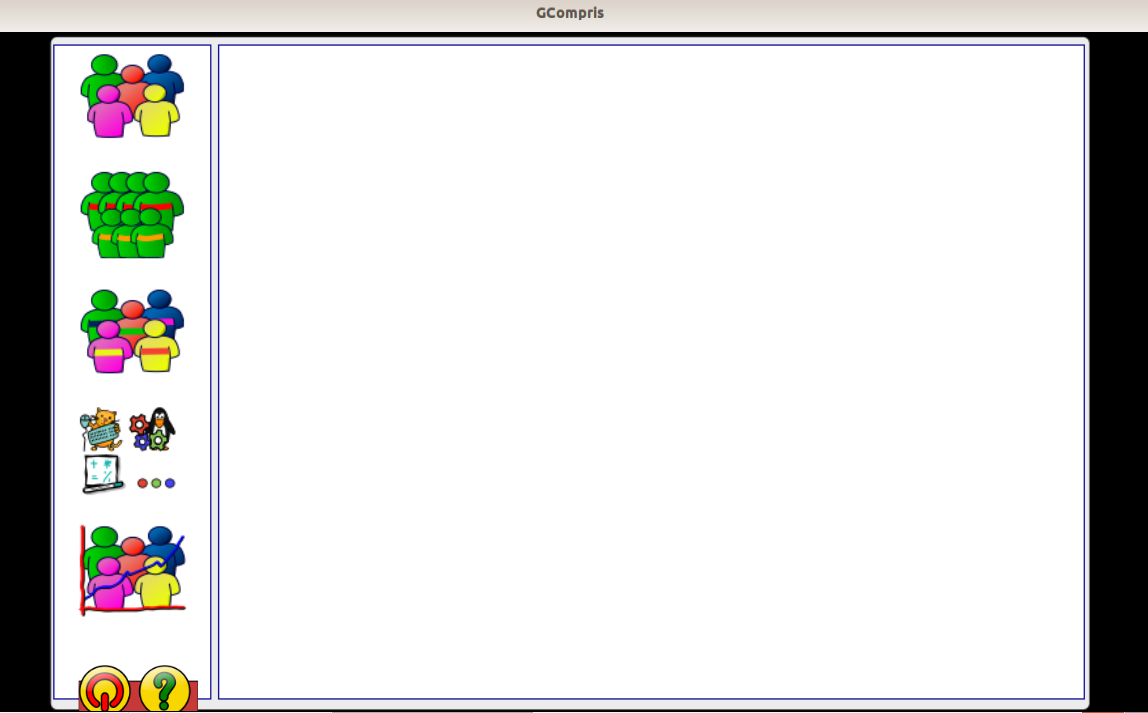
Screenshot of GCompris Administration (GTK+ Version)

The newer branch of GCompris is completely rewritten using Qt Quick. The current version is developed using JavaScript, QML and C++ languages.
