= Comparison of MQTT implementations =

MQTT is an ISO standard (ISO/IEC PRF 20922) publish–subscribe-based messaging protocol. It works on top of the Internet protocol suite TCP/IP. It is designed for connections with remote locations where a "small code footprint" is required or the network bandwidth is limited. The publish-subscribe messaging pattern requires a message broker.

All comparison categories use the stable version of each implementation listed in the overview section. The comparison is limited to features that relate to the MQTT protocol.

== Overview ==
The following table lists MQTT both libraries and implementations, along with general information about each.

Implementation	Developed by	Open source	Software license	Copyright owner	Programming language	Type	Latest stable release, release date	Origin
Adafruit IO	Adafruit	Yes	MIT	Adafruit	Ruby, Node.js, Python, Go	Client	2026-04 2.6.4,	US
Amlen	Eclipse	Yes	EPL 2.0	Eclipse Foundation	C	Broker	2024-02-07, 1.0.0.2	
Azure Event Grid MQTT broker	Microsoft	No	Commercial	Microsoft	C, C#/.NET, Java, JavaScript (NodeJs), Python, Go	Broker	2023-06-01-preview, 2023-05-25	US
CoreFlux	CoreFlux	No	Commercial	Coreflux Portugal Lda.	C, C#/.NET, Java, JavaScript (NodeJs), Go	Broker	2026-04, 2.0	Portugal
EMQX	EMQ	No	Apache 2.0	EMQ Technologies Inc.	Erlang	Broker	2025-12-31; V5.8.9,	China
EMQX Enterprise	EMQ	No	Commercial	EMQ Technologies Inc.	Erlang	Broker	2026-04-01; V6.2.0,	China
NanoMQ	EMQ	Yes	MIT	EMQ Technologies Inc.	C	Broker and client	2026-04-21 0.24.13	China
MQTT X	EMQ	Yes	Apache 2.0	EMQ Technologies Inc.	TypeScript	Client	2026-01-13 v1.13.0	China
FairCom Edge	FairCom	No	Commercial	FairCom Corporation	C	Broker	2020-11-01, 3.0.0	US
FlashMQ	Wiebe Cazemier	Yes	OSL3	Wiebe Cazemier	C++	Broker	2026-05-14, 1.26.2	Netherlands
flespi	Gurtam	No	Commercial	Gurtam	C	Broker	2018-04-05	Belarus
GridServer	GRID System	No	Commercial	GRID System S.A.S	Pascal, Delphi	Broker	2019-09-15	France
HiveMQ MQTT Client	HiveMQ	Yes	Apache 2.0	HiveMQ	Java	Client	2026-05; 1.3.14,	Germany
HiveMQ Community Edition	HiveMQ	Yes	Apache 2.0	HiveMQ	Java	Broker	2026-05-27; 2026.5,	Germany
HiveMQ	HiveMQ	No	Commercial	HiveMQ	Java	Broker	2026-11-03; 4.57.0	Germany
IBM WIoTP Message Gateway	IBM	No	Commercial	IBM	C	Broker	2019-02-29, 5.0.0.1	
JoramMQ	ScalAgent D.T.	No, based on OW2/Joram 5.19, open-source broker (LGPL)	Commercial	ScalAgent D.T.	Java	Broker	October 2024, 1.19.3	France
LavinMQ	CloudAMQP / 84codes	Yes	Apache 2.0	84codes AB	Crystal	Broker	2026-09-09; 2.9.3	Sweden
KMQTT	Davide Pianca	Yes	MIT	Davide Pianca	Kotlin	Client and broker	2024-12-11, 1.0.0,	Italy
LV-MQTT	Francois Normandin	Yes	0-BSD License	G Open Source Project for LabVIEW	LabVIEW	Broker and client	2024-01-14 4.0.4	Canada
M2Mqtt / Paho	Eclipse	Yes	Eclipse Public 1.0	Eclipse	C#	Client	2018-06-27; 1.4.0,	Canada
Machine Head	ClojureWerkz	Yes	Creative Commons Attribution 3.0 Unported License	Alexander Petrov, Michael Klishin, ClojureWerkz Team	Clojure	Client	2017-03-05; 1.0.0,	
Mongoose Library	Cesanta	Yes	GPLv2 or commercial	Cesanta	C / C++	Client and Broker	2026-04-01, 7.21	Ireland
moquette	Andrea Selva	Yes	Apache 2.0	Andrea Selva	Java	Broker	2024-12-27; 0.18,	Italy
Mosquitto	Eclipse	Yes	Eclipse Public License 2.0, Eclipse Distribution License 1.0 (BSD)	Eclipse	C	Client and broker	2026-02 2.1.3	UK
MQTT	Pascal de Kloe	Yes	Public domain	nobody	Go	Client	2020-02-22, v1.0.0	The Netherlands
MQTT-C	Liam Bindle	Yes	MIT	Liam Bindle	C	Client	2021-04-01; 1.1.5,	Canada
mqttools	Erik Moqvist	Yes	MIT	Erik Moqvist	Python	Client and broker	2020-01-20,0.34.0	Sweden
net-mqtt	Dustin Sallings	Yes	BSD 3-clause	Dustin Sallings	Haskell	Client	2019-10-12, 0.6.0.0	US
OpenRemote MQTT Broker	OpenRemote	Yes	AGPLv3	OpenRemote	Java	Broker	2021-03-10, 3.0.1	US
Paho MQTT	Eclipse	Yes	Eclipse Public 1.0, Eclipse Distribution License 1.0 (BSD)	Eclipse	C, C++, C#, Go, Java, JavaScript, Python, Rust	Client	2018-06-27; 1.4.0 (Photon),	UK
PubSub+	Solace	No	Commercial, free version	Solace	C, C#/.NET, Java, JavaScript (NodeJs), Python, Go	Broker	2021-01-14; 9.8.1	Canada
RabbitMQ MQTT plugin	VMware	Yes	Commercial, free version	VMware	C#/.NET, Java, Erlang	Client and Broker	2025-12-15; 4.2.2	
RMQTT	rmqtt	Yes	MIT	rmqtt	Rust	Broker	2023-11-04, 0.2.20	
Thingstream	Thingstream	No	Commercial	Thingstream	C, C++, Java, JavaScript, Python, Go	Client and broker	2019-03-14, 3.3.0	UK
VerneMQ	VerneMQ/Octavo Labs	Yes	Apache 2.0	VerneMQ/Octavo Labs	Erlang/OTP	Broker	2024-04-15, 2.0.0	Switzerland
wolfMQTT	wolfSSL	Yes	GNU GPL, version 3, commercial	wolfSSL	C	Client	2022-01-07; 1.11.0	US
eMQTT5	Cyril Russo	Yes	MIT	Cyril Russo	C++	Client	2020-03-31, 1.0	France
Bevywise MQTTBroker	Bevywise Networks	No	Commercial	Bevywise Networks	C, Python	Broker	2018-10-20, v1.1	India
OpenHAB MQTT binding	OpenHAB	Yes	Eclipse Public	OpenHAB	Java	Client	2020-04-21, 2.5.4	Germany
Waterstream	SimpleMatter	No	Commercial	SimpleMatter Srl	Kotlin	Broker	1.00.03	Italy
MQTTDESK MQTT Client	ioCtrl	No	Commercial	ioCtrl	Node.js	Client	2021-05-25, v2.1.0	India
MQTTnet	.NET Foundation	Yes	MIT	.NET Foundation	C#	Client and broker	v4.1.3.436	US
Boost.MQTT5	Mireo	Yes	Boost	Mireo	C++	Client	2025-02-17, v1.0.3	Croatia
MQTTfy	MQTTfy	No	Commercial	MQTTfy	Node.js	Client & MQTT based AI platform	2026-01-14, v2.1.0	India

A more complete list of MQTT implementations can be found on GitHub.

== Protocol support ==
There are several versions of the MQTT protocol currently standardized. Below is a list containing the more recent versions of the MQTT protocol, with the organization that standardized them.

- MQTT-SN v1.2, standardized by IBM.
- MQTT v3.1, standardized by Eurotech and IBM.
- MQTT v3.1.1, standardized by OASIS.
- MQTT v5.0, standardized by OASIS.

The following table lists the versions of MQTT that each implementation supports, and also lists their support for SSL/TLS and TCP. The security provided by SSL/TLS may be desirable depending on the type traffic being sent between devices, as MQTT transmits messages in the clear.

Implementation	MQTT-SN v1.2	MQTT 3.1	MQTT 3.1.1	MQTT 5.0	SSL/TLS	TCP	WS/WSS
Amlen		Yes	Yes	Yes	Yes	Yes	Yes
Azure Event Grid MQTT broker			Yes	Yes	Yes	Yes	Yes
CoreFlux		Yes	Yes	Yes	Yes	Yes	Yes
EMQX	Yes	Yes	Yes	Yes	Yes	Yes	Yes
FairCom Edge	Yes	Yes	Yes		Yes	Yes	Yes
FlashMQ		Yes	Yes	Yes	Yes	Yes	Yes
flespi		Yes	Yes	Yes	Yes	Yes	Yes
HiveMQ		Yes (only for broker)	Yes	Yes	Yes	Yes	Yes
IBM WIoTP Message Gateway		Yes	Yes	Yes	Yes	Yes	Yes
JoramMQ	Yes	Yes	Yes	Yes	Yes	Yes	Yes
KMQTT			Yes	Yes	Yes	Yes	Yes
LMQTT		via old stack	via old stack	Yes	Yes	Yes	Yes
LV-MQTT		Yes	Yes		Yes	Yes	Yes
M2Mqtt		Yes	Yes		Yes	Yes	
Machine Head							
Mongoose		Yes	Yes	Yes	Yes	Yes	Yes
moquette		Yes	Yes		Yes	Yes	
Mosquitto		Yes	Yes	Yes	Supports certificate-based and pre-shared-key-based SSL/TLS, general support for SSL/TLS across bridges	Yes	Yes
MQTT-C		Yes	Yes		Yes	Yes	
mqttools				Yes	Yes	Yes	
net-mqtt		Yes	Yes	Yes	Yes	Yes	Yes
Paho MQTT	Yes	Yes	Yes	Yes (only in C, Python, and Java client library)	Yes	Yes	Yes
RMQTT		Yes	Yes	Yes	Yes	Yes	Yes
Solace PubSub+			Yes	Yes	Yes	Yes	Yes
SharkMQTT		Yes	Yes		Yes	Yes	
Thingstream	Yes			Yes	Yes	Yes	
VerneMQ		Yes	Yes	Yes	Yes	Yes	Yes
wolfMQTT	Yes		Yes	Yes	Yes	Yes	
eMQTT5				Yes	Yes	Yes	
Bevywise Networks	Yes	Yes	Yes		Yes	Yes	Yes
Waterstream		Yes	Yes		Yes		Yes
MqttDesk		Yes	Yes	Yes	Yes	Yes	Yes
MQTTnet		Yes	Yes	Yes	Yes	Yes	Yes
Boost.MQTT5				Yes	Yes	Yes	Yes
MQTTfy		Yes	Yes	Yes	Yes	Yes	Yes

== Quality of service levels offered ==
From the MQTT page, quality of service (QoS) is described as,

Quality of service refers to traffic prioritization and resource reservation control mechanisms rather than the achieved service quality. Quality of service is the ability to provide different priority to different applications, users, or data flows, or to guarantee a certain level of performance to a data flow.

A description of each QoS level is found below.

0. At most one delivery (fire and forget)
1. At least one delivery (acknowledged delivery)
2. Exactly one delivery (assured delivery)

The following table lists each implementation's support of the QoS levels.

Implementation	0	1	2
Adafruit IO	Yes	Yes	No
Amlen	Yes	Yes	Yes
Azure Event Grid MQTT broker	Yes	Yes	No
CoreFlux	Yes	Yes	Yes
EMQX	Yes	Yes	Yes
FairCom Edge	Yes	Yes	Yes
FlashMQ	Yes	Yes	Yes
flespi	Yes	Yes	Yes
HiveMQ	Yes	Yes	Yes
IBM WIoTP Message Gateway	Yes	Yes	Yes
JoramMQ	Yes	Yes	Yes
KMQTT	Yes	Yes	Yes
LMQTT	Yes	Yes	Yes
LV-MQTT	Yes	Yes	Yes
M2Mqtt	Yes	Yes	Yes
Mongoose	Yes	Yes	Yes
moquette	Yes	Yes	Yes
Mosquitto	Yes	Yes	Yes
MQTT-C	Yes	Yes	Yes
mqttools	Yes	No	No
net-mqtt	Yes	Yes	Yes
Paho MQTT	Yes	Yes	Yes
Solace PubSub+	Yes	Yes	No
SharkMQTT	Yes	Yes	Yes
Thingstream	Yes	Yes	Yes
VerneMQ	Yes	Yes	Yes
wolfMQTT	Yes	Yes	Yes
eMQTT5	Yes	Yes	Yes
Bevywise MQTTBroker	Yes	Yes	Yes
Waterstream	Yes	Yes	Yes
MqttDesk MQTT Client	Yes	Yes	Yes
MQTTnet	Yes	Yes	Yes
Boost.MQTT5	Yes	Yes	Yes
MQTTfy	Yes	Yes	Yes

== Portability concerns ==
Portability concerns in this section refers to technical details that may be deciding factors in selecting an implementation to use. In general, this table should be used by those with more knowledge about the device they will be using.

Implementation	Platform requirements	Network requirements	Thread safety	Able to cross-compile	Bare metal
Adafruit IO	Adafruit Feather Huzzah, ESP8266, Raspberry Pi, Arduino, any platform that supports Python, Ruby, or Node.js	Platform-dependent			
Amlen	Linux		Yes		Yes
CoreFlux	Linux, Unix, macOS, Windows, Raspberry Pi		Yes	Yes	Yes
EMQX	Linux, Unix, macOS, Windows, Raspberry Pi		Yes	Yes	Yes
Faircom Edge	Linux, MacOS, Windows, Raspberry Pi, Android		Yes	Yes	Yes
flespi					
HiveMQ	JVM, Linux, macOS, Windows, Raspberry Pi		Yes	Yes	Yes
JoramMQ	JVM, Linux, macOS, Windows, Raspberry Pi		Yes	Yes	Yes
KMQTT	JVM, Linux, Windows, Raspberry Pi		Yes	Yes	
M2Mqtt	Any .NET platform (.NET Framework, .NET Compact Framework, .NET Micro Framework), WinRT				
Machine Head	Leiningen 2				
mosquitto	C90, Linux, Unix, macOS, Windows, Raspberry Pi		Yes	Yes	
MQTT-C	ANSI C (C89); Platform agnostic (in use in bare metal, Linux, macOS, and Windows applications)	Network IO callbacks	Yes. Also supports single-thread applications.	Yes	Yes
net-mqtt	GHC	Yes	Yes	Yes	
Paho MQTT	ANSI C (for C client), C++11 (for C++ client), JVM or Android (for Java client)			For C, C++ clients	For C, C++ clients
SharkMQTT	ANSI C (C89); Platform agnostic (in use in bare metal, RTOS, HLOS))		Yes	Yes	Yes
wolfMQTT	C89	Network IO callbacks	Yes	Yes	Yes
eMQTT5	Linux, Unix, macOS, Windows, ESP32, STM32 (with lwIP and Mbed TLS) C++11	BSD socket implementation	Yes	Yes	Yes
Bevywise MQTTBroker	Linux, Unix, macOS, Windows, Raspberry Pi				Yes
MqttDesk	Linux, Unix, macOS, Windows, Raspberry Pi				
MQTTfy	Linux, Unix, macOS, Windows, Raspberry Pi				

== General requirements ==
The table below shows various requirements that may be useful when deciding on which implementation to use for a device.

Implementation	Build tools	Platform requirements	Operating system support
Adafruit IO			
Amlen	Make, Ant	Linux	CentOS, Red Hat Enterprise Linux
CoreFlux		Linux, Unix, macOS, Windows, Raspberry Pi	CentOS, NixOS, Nix (package manager), Debian, Docker, Ubuntu, Red Hat Enterprise Linux, macOS, Windows 10, Windows 7, Raspbian (Raspberry Pi OS)
EMQX	Erlang/OTP R19+ (when building from source)	Linux, Unix, macOS, Windows, Raspberry Pi	CentOS, Debian, Docker, macOS, Ubuntu, Red Hat Enterprise Linux, Windows 10, Windows 7, Raspbian (Raspberry Pi OS)
FairCom Edge	Visual Studio, Make, CMake, gcc	C compiler (ANSI C/C89 or later)	Linux, macOS, Windows, Raspbian (Raspberry Pi OS), Android
flespi			N/A (it's cloud-based)
HiveMQ		Linux, Unix, macOS, Windows, Raspberry Pi	CentOS, Debian, Docker, Ubuntu, Red Hat Enterprise Linux, macOS, Windows 10, Windows 7, Raspbian (Raspberry Pi OS)
IBM WIoTP Message Gateway		Linux	CentOS, Docker, Red Hat Enterprise Linux
JoramMQ	Maven, Java	Linux, Unix, macOS, Windows, Raspberry Pi	CentOS, Debian, Docker, Ubuntu, Red Hat Enterprise Linux, macOS, Windows 10, Windows 7, Raspbian (Raspberry Pi OS)
KMQTT	Gradle, Kotlin	Linux, JVM, Windows, Raspberry Pi	Linux, Windows
M2Mqtt	Visual Studio	Any .NET system (.NET Framework, .NET Compact Framework, .NET Micro Framework), WinRT	Windows 98 or later, Windows Phone 8.1
Machine Head	Maven, Leiningen	Leiningen 2	macOS, Linux (specific mentions of Debian, Ubuntu)
mosquitto	Make, CMake	C90	BSD, Linux, macOS, QNX, Windows
MQTT-C	Make (optional); CMake (optional)	C compiler (ANSI C/C89 or later)	Bare metal, Linux, macOS, Windows
net-mqtt	stack	GHC	
Paho MQTT	Autotools, CMake, gmake, gcc, g++ or clang++ for C++ clients, Maven for Java clients	ANSI C (for C client), C++11 (for C++ client), JVM or Android (for Java client)	Varies by language; see official Eclipse Paho MQTT Download page here
Solace PubSub+		Linux, macOS, Windows	CentOS, Debian, Docker, KVM, Ubuntu, Red Hat Enterprise Linux, macOS, Windows 10, Windows 7; also Cloud
SharkMQTT	Any, including Make	C compiler (ANSI C/C89 or later)	Bare metal and all operating systems
wolfMQTT	Autotools (autoconf, automake), Visual Studio, wolfSSL to enable extra features such as SSL/TLS support	C89	Win32/64, Linux, macOS, Solaris, ThreadX, VxWorks, FreeBSD, NetBSD, OpenBSD, embedded Linux, Yocto Linux, OpenEmbedded, WinCE, Haiku, OpenWRT, iPhone (iOS), Android, Nintendo Wii and Gamecube through DevKitPro, QNX, MontaVista, NonStop, TRON–ITRON–μITRON, Micrium μC/OS-III, FreeRTOS, SafeRTOS, NXP/Freescale MQX, Nucleus, TinyOS, HP/UX, AIX, ARC MQX, TI-RTOS, uTasker, embOS, INtime, Mbed, uT-Kernel, RIOT, CMSIS-RTOS, , Green Hills Integrity, Keil RTX, TOPPERS, PetaLinux, Apache Mynewt, PikeOS (IDEs: Arduino, MPLAB Harmony)
eMQTT5	cmake, Mbed TLS to enable extra features such as SSL/TLS support	C++11	Win32/64, Linux, macOS, FreeRTOS, FreeBSD, NetBSD, OpenBSD, embedded Linux, Yocto Linux,
Bevywise MQTTBroker	Autotools, Visual Studio	Linux, Unix, macOS, Windows, Raspberry Pi	CentOS, Debian, Docker, KVM, Ubuntu, Red Hat Enterprise Linux, macOS, Windows32/64, Windows Server, Raspberry Pi, also Cloud
OpenHAB	Eclipse Java build system	Linux, Unix, macOS, Windows, Raspberry Pi	CentOS, Debian, Ubuntu, Red Hat Enterprise Linux, macOS, Windows32/64, Raspberry Pi
MqttDesk		Linux, Unix, macOS, Windows, Raspberry Pi	CentOS, Debian, macOS, Ubuntu, Red Hat Enterprise Linux, Windows 10, Windows 7, Raspberry Pi OS
MQTTnet	Visual Studio	.NET 8	.NET 8 supported OS list
MQTTfy		Linux, Unix, macOS, Windows, Raspberry Pi	CentOS, Debian, macOS, Ubuntu, Red Hat Enterprise Linux, Windows 10, Windows 7, Raspberry Pi OS
