= Basic-256 =

Computer programming language and learning project

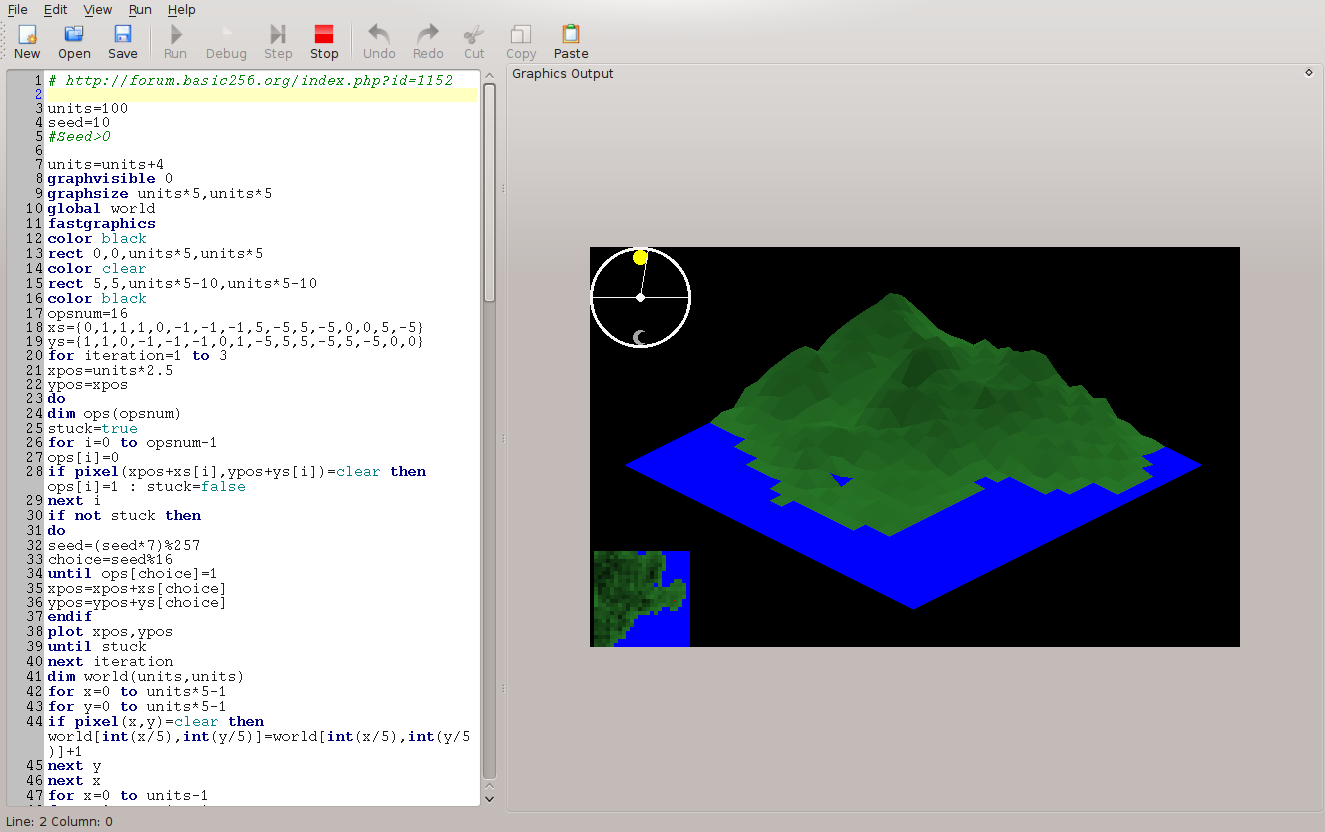
- Basic-256 1.0.0.0
- Developers: Ian Larsen & James M. Reneau
- Stable release: 2.0.0.11 / June 30, 2020; 6 years ago
- Operating system: Cross-platform
- Type: Programming language
- License: GPL
- Website: basic256.org
- Repository: sourceforge.net/projects/kidbasic/

Basic-256 is a project to learn the basics of computer programming. The project started in 2007 inspired by the article “Why Johnny can't code” by David Brin, which also inspired the creation of Microsoft Small Basic. Its main focus is to provide a simple and comprehensive environment for middle/high school students to learn the basics of computer programming.

Basic-256 started as a simple version of BASIC: the code editor, text output window and graphics display window are all visible in the same screen. However, successive versions have added new features, namely:

- Files (Eof, Size) – Version 9.4d
- Mouse events – Version 9.4d
- Sprites handling – Version 0.9.6n
- Database functions – Version 0.9.6y
- Network – Version 0.9.6.31
- Real Functions and Subroutines – Version 0.9.9.1
- Maps (Dictionaries) – Version 2.0.0.1

Complete documentation is available in English, Russian, Dutch, Spanish and Portuguese.

== See also ==
- Microsoft Small Basic
- Thonny
- Toolbox
- Kojo
- JUDO
