= RSS Cloud =

RSS Cloud is an optional sub-element of the RSS protocol's <channel> element that enables realtime (immediate) push notifications or distributed publish/subscribe communication for feeds. This is done using a <cloud> element allowing a software service to register with a cloud which notifies subscribers of updates to the channel. RSS Cloud is not limited to RSS feeds but can also be used with other feed formats such as Atom. On September 7, 2009 WordPress became the first large supporter of the protocol, enabling the <cloud> tag for over 7.5 million hosted blogs on WordPress.com.

Another protocol superseding the use of the <cloud> element is WebSub. In addition to functionality provided by RSS Cloud, WebSub push notifications include content of the updated feed entries and do not unsubscribe unsuspecting subscribers after 25 hours.
