= Thonny =

Python IDE

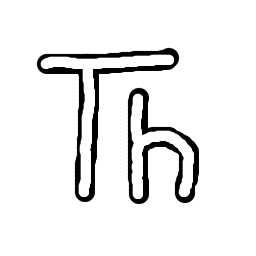

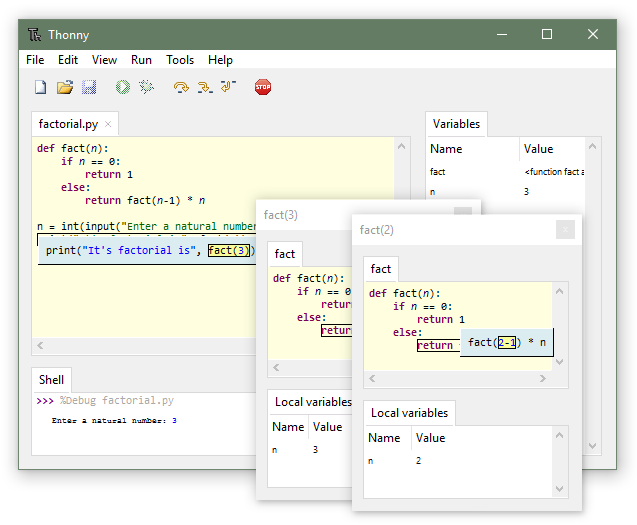
- Developers: Aivar Annamaa and contributors
- Stable release: 4.1.7 / 16 December 2024
- Written in: Python
- Operating system: Cross-platform
- Platform: Windows, Linux, macOS
- Type: Integrated development environment
- License: MIT
- Website: thonny.org
- Repository: github.com/thonny/thonny/

Thonny (/ˈθɒni/ THON-ee) is a free and open-source integrated development environment for Python that is designed for beginners. It was created by Aivar Annamaa, an Estonian programmer. It supports different ways of stepping through code, step-by-step expression evaluation, detailed visualization of the call stack and a mode for explaining the concepts of references and heap.

== Features ==
- Line numbers
- Statement stepping without breakpoints
- Live variables during debugging
- Stepping through evaluation of the expressions (expressions get replaced by their values)
- Separate windows for executing function calls (for explaining local variables and call stack)
- Variables and memory can be explained either by using simplified model (name → value) or by using more realistic model (name → address/id → value)
- Simple pip GUI
- Support for CPython and MicroPython
- Support for running and managing files on a remote machine via SSH
- Possibility to log user actions for replaying or analyzing the programming process

== Availability ==
The program works on Windows, macOS and Linux. It is available as a binary bundle including the recent Python interpreter or pip-installable package. It can be installed via the operating-system package manager on Debian, Raspberry Pi, Ubuntu, and Fedora. It is written in Python with the Tk widget toolkit using Tkinter binding.

== Reception ==
Thonny has received favorable reviews from Python and computer science education communities. It has been a recommended tool in several programming MOOCs. Since June 2017 it has been included by default in the Raspberry Pi's official operating system distribution Raspberry Pi OS.

== See also ==
- List of integrated development environments for Python programming language
- Toolbox
- Kojo
- JUDO
- BASIC-256
- Microsoft Small Basic
