= Saved search =

Saved search is a search query in search engine technology that is saved for future reuse:

- Prospective search, searching a changing corpus for new search results
- Virtual folders, an organizing principle in file management where folders represent search result sets
- View (database), a virtual relational table which is defined as a database query
- A feature of Web search engines that saves queries for reuse
