= Andy Stanford-Clark =

British information technology research engineer

Andy Stanford-Clark FBCS CITP
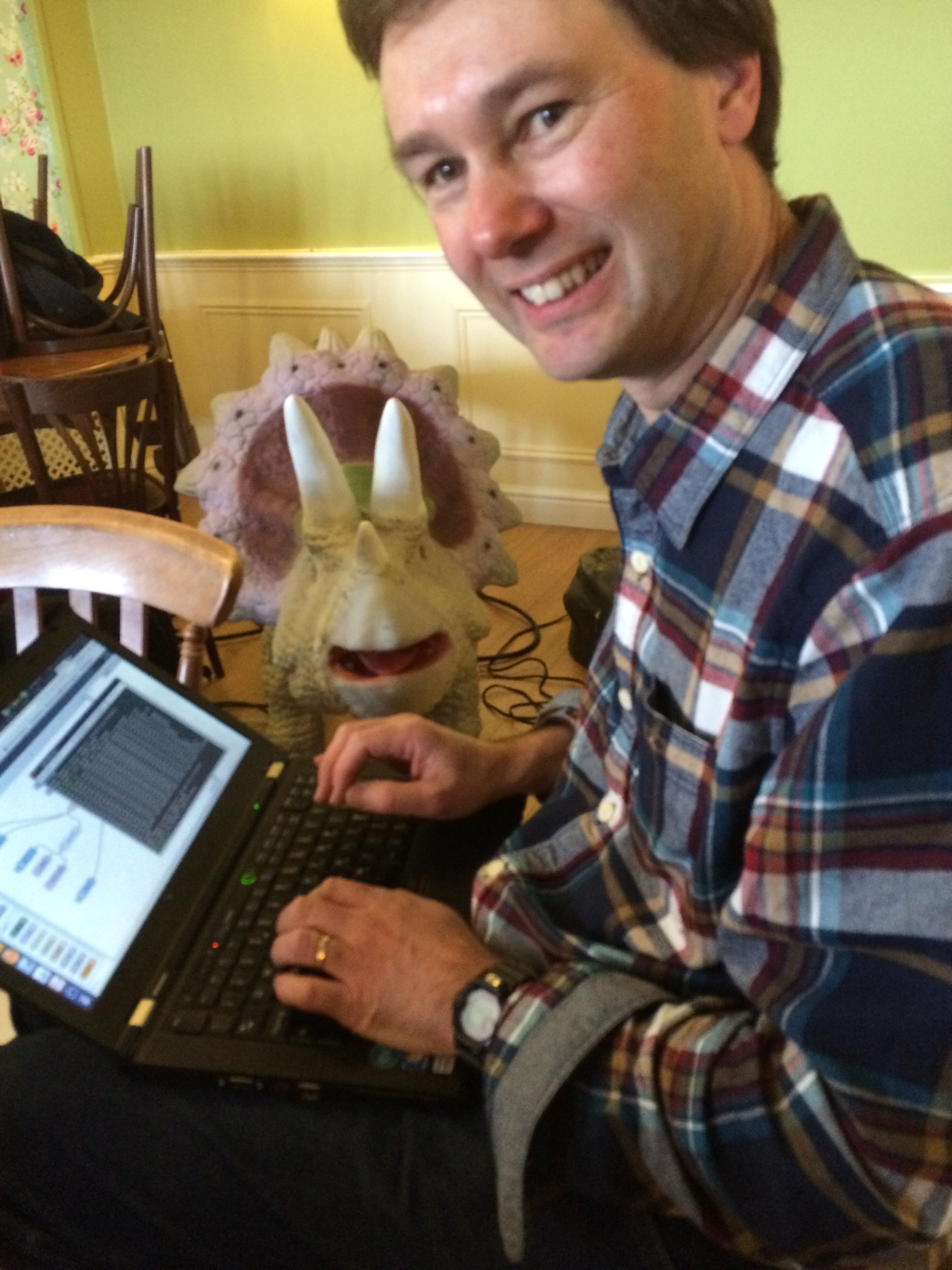
- Stanford-Clark with a model triceratops
- Born: Andrew James Stanford-Clark
- Education: Stockport Grammar School
- Alma mater: University of East Anglia (BSc, PhD)
- Known for: MQTT
- Awards: IBM Master Inventor
- Scientific career
- Institutions: IBM; Newcastle University
- Thesis: Parallel paradigms and their implementation (1991)
- Website: stanford-clark.com

Andrew James Stanford-Clark is a British information technology research engineer, specialising in telemetry and publish/subscribe messaging. In July 2017, he was appointed IBM CTO for UK and Ireland. Previously, he led a research team at IBM. He is a Member of the IBM Academy of Technology, an IBM Master Inventor and visiting professor at Newcastle University. He also serves on the Engineering and Physical Sciences Research Council (EPSRC) peer review college and regularly delivers public talks.

== Education ==
Stanford-Clark was educated at Stockport Grammar School, Cheshire, and the University of East Anglia, Norwich. He holds a Bachelor of Science (BSc) degree in computer science and mathematics from the University of East Anglia (UEA) and completed his PhD in parallel computing at UEA in 1991.

== Career ==
Stanford-Clark joined IBM in 1991 in the Communications Software group. Stanford-Clark performed a number of roles within IBM, focusing primarily on parallel processing and pervasive messaging. When he started his job, his manager offered him the career advice that “there’s only one person who REALLY cares about your career, and that's you”.

In 2010 he became Chief Technology Officer (CTO) of Smart Energy Technologies, as part of IBM's smarter planet strategy, based on his background in pervasive messaging.

Stanford-Clark has been granted 11 patents and, as of 2014 has 45 pending, as well as 30 additional invention disclosures published in IBM Technology Journal and IP.com. Stanford-Clark has also taken an active role in mentoring others and played a part in accelerating innovation, highlighted by his involvement in an IBM student scheme called Extreme Blue. Stanford-Clark leads the pervasive and advanced messaging technologies research group. The group works to further IBM's Smarter Planet initiative and is based at Hursley House near Winchester, Hampshire.

=== Telemetry ===
In 1999, Stanford-Clark collaborated with Arlen Nipper to author the first version of the MQ Telemetry Transport (MQTT) protocol. MQTT is a specialised protocol enabling telemetry or lightweight sensor and mobile systems to provide information to computer programs via a publish/subscribe mechanism. Stanford-Clark gained media attention for this in the late 2000s by connecting his home automation system via MQTT to Twitter.

=== Awards and honours ===
In 2002 Stanford-Clark became a member of IBM Academy of Technology and was recognised as an IBM Master Inventor. He became an IBM Distinguished Engineer in 2007. In 2006, Stanford-Clark became a Fellow of the British Computer Society (FBCS) and Chartered IT Professional (CITP). He was appointed an IBM Master Inventor and has given TEDx talks. In 2015 he appeared in University Challenge on BBC2.
