= Superfeedr =

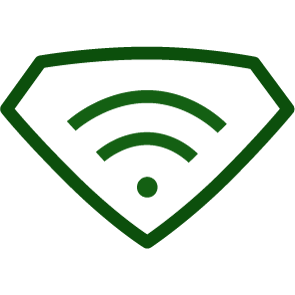
- Headquarters: San Francisco, California, {{{location_country}}}
- Area served: Worldwide
- Founder: Julien Genestoux
- Key people: Mark Cuban (investor) Betaworks (investor)
- Industry: Web application
- Parent: Notifixious, Inc.
- Website: superfeedr.com

Superfeedr is a feed API built on WebSub that is sometimes referred to as PuSH. It transforms a variety of feeds into a standardized RSS, Atom, or JSON format and distributes "pushes" them via WebSub or XMPP. Feeds allow publishers to send notifications to subscribers when content is updated.

== History ==
Superfeedr was launched in 2009 by parent company Notifixious. While Notifixious' website went offline sometime between September 23, 2009 and January 5, 2010 and is no longer available. Superfeedr has remained online and available and continues to refer to Notifixious in the terms of service for the site.

Superfeedr was bought by Medium in 2016.

== Technology ==
PuSH is a protocol that relies on webhooks to push feed updates in real-time from publishers to subscribers in a decentralized manner. PuSH builds on existing protocols, ensuring that polling infrastructures currently in use are not changed or broken on implementation, and that polling is still available as a back-up. Superfeedr acts as a “default” hub that works for an RSS or Atom feed, whether the publisher supports the protocol or not.

Superfeedr also built a feed graph to identify updates in related feeds to avoid polling feeds too aggressively.

== Features ==
Publishers are web applications that host their WebSub hub with Superfeedr, while subscribers are applications that consume the feed API to aggregate feeds from across the web. Trackers, a new type of user application that subscribes to search queries, was added to Superfeedr in April 2015. Complex queries can be tracked by including or excluding search terms, exact or inexact match queries, and by using language filters. The tracking feature (a prospective search engine) is scaled to parse millions of feeds and their metadata to add extra filtering options.

== Funding ==
In late 2009, Mark Cuban and Betaworks invested in Superfeedr during a round of seed funding.
