= Kojo (learning environment) =

The Kojo Learning Environment
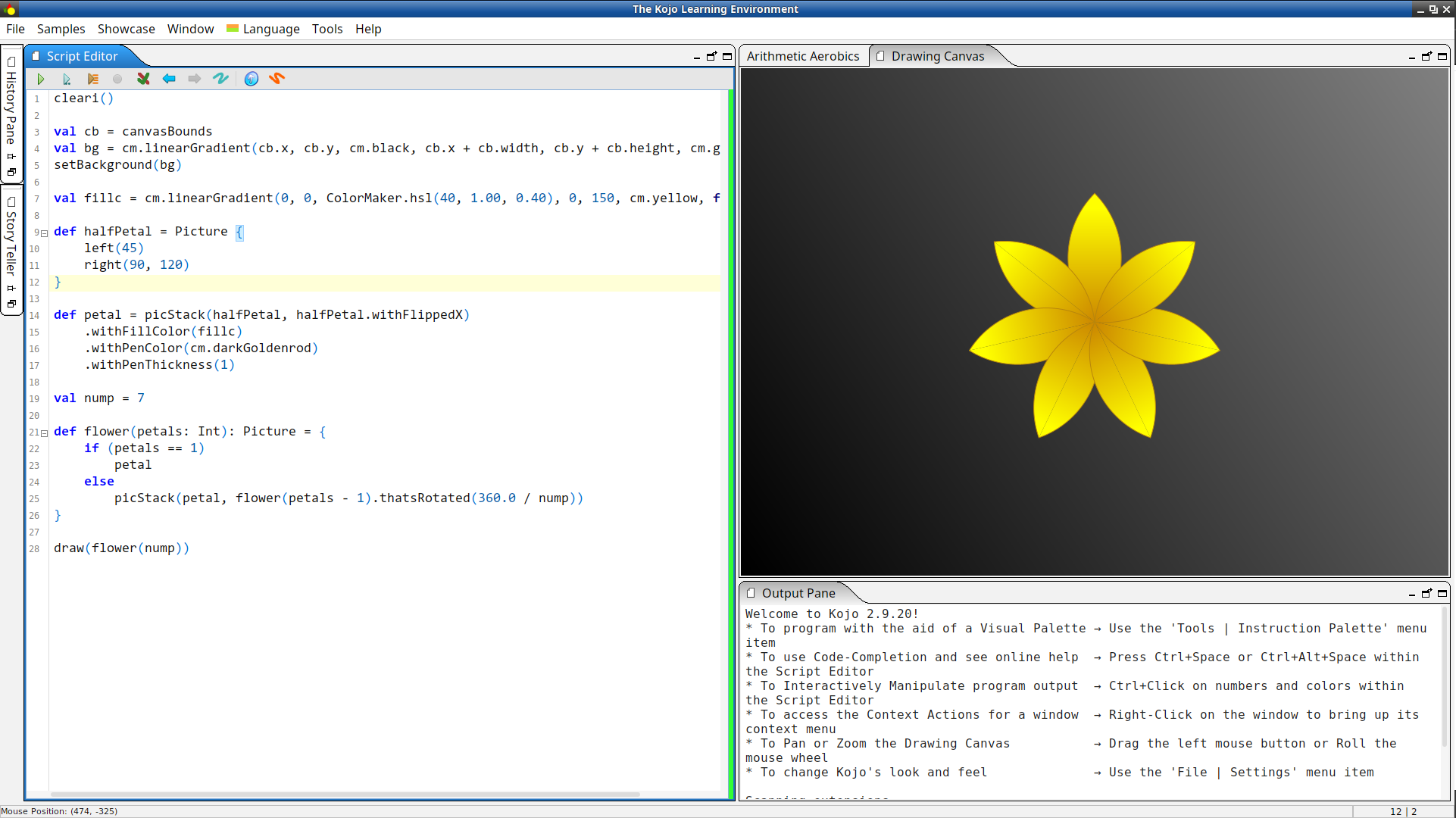
- A screenshot of Kojo
- Paradigm: structured, functional, object-oriented
- Designed by: Lalit Pant
- First appeared: 2010; 16 years ago
- Stable release: 2.9.33 / 4 December 2025; 6 months ago
- Typing discipline: strong
- OS: Cross-platform: Linux, macOS, Windows
- License: GPL
- Filename extensions: .scala, .kojo
- Website: kogics.net/kojo

Influenced by
- Logo, Processing

Kojo is a programming language and integrated development environment (IDE) for computer programming and learning. It has many different features that enable playing, exploring, creating, and learning in the areas of computer programming, mental skills, (interactive) math, graphics, art, music, science, animation, games, and electronics. Kojo draws ideas from the programming languages Logo and Processing.

Kojo is open-source software. It was created, and is actively developed, by Lalit Pant, a computer programmer and teacher living in Dehradun, India. Kojo is published by the Kogics Foundation, a nonprofit organization that was founded by Lalit. Kojo provides domain-specific languages (DSLs) for its different areas of learning, and as such can be considered an educational programming language.

Kojo is written in, and its approach is based on, the programming language Scala, where users begin with a simple subset of the language and progress in steps. Its graphical user interface is based on Java Swing; a former version was based on the Java NetBeans platform.

Lalit chose Scala as the underlying language for Kojo because of its low barrier to entry and potential power.

Kojo has been used in schools and classes around the world. Some of these include:

- The State of Goa, within its ICT/coding curriculum.
- Himjyoti School, Dehradun, India.
- Mondrian House School, Dehradun, India.
- Rishi Valley School, Madanapalle, India.
- Cardinal Forest Elementary School, Springfield, Virginia, USA.
- Diablo Valley College, Pleasant Hill, California, USA.
- Our Lady's Catholic High School, Preston, England.
- A Swedish 4th grade class consisting of 10-year-old children. Kojo has been featured by Dagens Nyheter (DN) and Computer Sweden as a result of the work done by this class.
- Events like Silicon Valley Code Camp, CoderDojo, Hack The Future, and Meetups.

The development of Kojo is partly sponsored by Lightbend, formerly TypeSafe, and Lund University, Computer Science Department, where Kojo is used to introduce children and teachers to computer programming. Professor Björn Regnell of Lund University has an informative presentation on the subject. Professor Regnell writes, in translation: "Kojo is the best tool, with a low barrier of entry, I have seen for making real text based programming available for children, that is also usable all the way up to university level".

Kojo provides rich support for programming and learning in the Turkish language as of the latest release in 2021 and beyond.

== See also ==
- Thonny
- Microsoft Small Basic
- BASIC-256
- Toolbox
- JUDO
