= Prospective =

Prospective refers to an event that is likely or expected to happen in the future. For example, a prospective student is someone who is considering attending a school. A prospective cohort study is a type of study, e.g., in sociology or medicine, that follows participants for a particular future time period.

It may also refer to the following:

- Prospective aspect, a grammatical aspect
- Prospective Dolly (born 1987), Thoroughbred racehorse
- Prospective memory, remembering to perform an intended action
- Prospective parliamentary candidate, a term used in British politics
- Prospective Piloted Transport System, a project to develop a new-generation crewed spacecraft
- Prospective search, a method of searching on the Internet
- Prospective short-circuit current, the highest electric current which can exist in a particular electrical system under short circuit conditions
- Prospective payment system, a payment model used in health care to control costs

== See also ==
- Retrospective generally means to study events that already have taken place.
