= Twister OS =

Operating system for the Raspberry Pi

- Developer: Pi Labs
- OS family: Unix-like
- Working state: Current
- Source model: Open-source
- Supported platforms: ARM (Raspberry Pi, RK3399), x86-64
- Kernel type: Monolithic (Linux)
- Userland: GNU
- Influenced by: Raspberry Pi OS, Armbian
- Default user interface: Xfce
- License: Various (Free software, some proprietary)
- Official website: twisteros.com

Twister OS is a Linux-based operating system developed by Pi Labs for the Raspberry Pi series of single-board computers. A version for x86-64-based personal computers was released shortly after the initial Raspberry Pi release. The operating system is based on Raspberry Pi OS Lite and uses the Xfce desktop environment.

Twister OS is intended to provide a general-purpose computing experience with a visual style that evokes familiarity with other operating systems. It includes themes that resemble those of various versions of Microsoft Windows and macOS. Variants of Twister OS have been developed for different hardware platforms, including ARM-based systems with RK3399 processors.

== Features ==
Twister OS includes multiple desktop themes designed to replicate the appearance of Windows 95, XP, 7, 10, and 11, as well as macOS-inspired themes such as iTwister and iTwister Sur. Most themes include optional dark modes. The system also includes a custom "Twister OS" theme.

The distribution includes compatibility tools such as:

- Box86, an emulator that allows the execution of x86 Linux applications on ARM devices.
- Wine, a compatibility layer that enables the execution of Windows applications on Linux systems.
- CommanderPi, a system utility for hardware monitoring and overclocking.

== Variants ==
Twister OS is available in multiple versions tailored to different hardware configurations and use cases:

=== Twister OS ===
The standard version targeting ARM-based single-board computers with 64-bit BCM27xx processors like the Raspberry Pi 4/400 and 5/500. Includes all features, themes, and bundled utilities.

=== Twister OS Armbian ===
This version targets ARM-based single-board computers based on the Armbian framework, such as the Rock Pi 4B/4C and the Odroid N2/N2+. It comes preinstalled on select devices.

=== Twister UI ===
Designed for x86-64 systems, Twister UI is not a standalone operating system but a customization layer applied to existing installations of Linux Mint (Xfce) or Xubuntu. It provides the same desktop themes and visual enhancements as Twister OS.
