= Eclipse Paho =

Message queuing implementation

- Developer(s): eclipse
- Initial release: 2014
- Stable release: 1.4.1 / February 25, 2019; 6 years ago
- Written in: Java, C, Go, C#, Python, JavaScript
- Operating system: Cross-platform
- Platform: Java Virtual Machine, .NET
- Type: MQTT implementation
- License: Eclipse Public License
- Website: www.eclipse.org/paho/

Eclipse Paho is a MQTT (Message Queuing Telemetry Transport) implementation.

Paho is available on various platforms and programming languages:

- Java
- C#
- Go
- C
- Python
- JavaScript
- Rust

== Example ==
A simple example of using Paho could be:

client = new MqttClient("tcp://localhost:1883", "pahomqttExample");
client.connect();
MqttMessage message = new MqttMessage();
message.setPayload("Hello World".getBytes());
client.publish("pahoExample/theTopic", message);
client.disconnect();

== See also ==
- Message Queuing Telemetry Transport
