= Stockport Grammar School =

Private day school in England

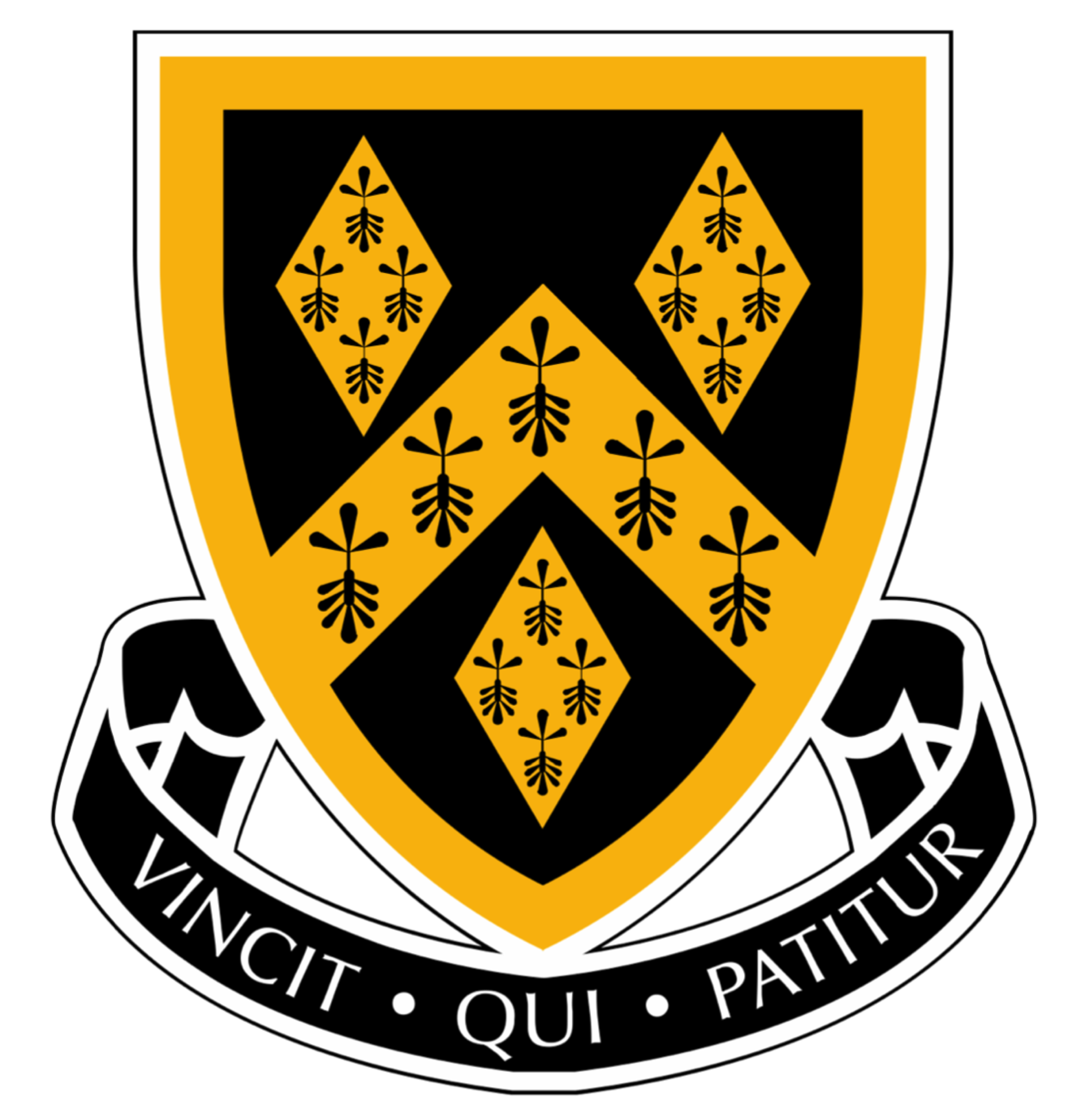

Location
- Buxton Road; Stockport, Greater Manchester, SK2 7AF; England; 53.3907°N 2.1440°W

Information
- Type: Private day school
- Motto: Latin: Vincit Qui Patitur; They who endures, conquers
- Established: 1487; 539 years ago
- Founder: Sir Edmund Shaa
- Local authority: Stockport
- Department for Education URN: 106156 Tables
- Chair of governors: Paul Brearley
- Head: Sarah Capewell
- Gender: Co-educational
- Age: 3 to 18
- Enrolment: 1,500
- Houses: Arden, Nicholson, Vernon, Warren
- Colours: Black and gold
- Song: Psalm 130
- Publication: The Stopfordian; Taking Stock; The Old Stops' Review
- Former pupils: Old Stopfordians
- Website: stockportgrammar.co.uk

Stockport Grammar School is a co-educational private day school in Stockport, England. The school was founded in 1487 by Sir Edmund Shaa, a former Lord Mayor of London, and is a member of The Heads' Conference.

== History ==
=== Foundation ===
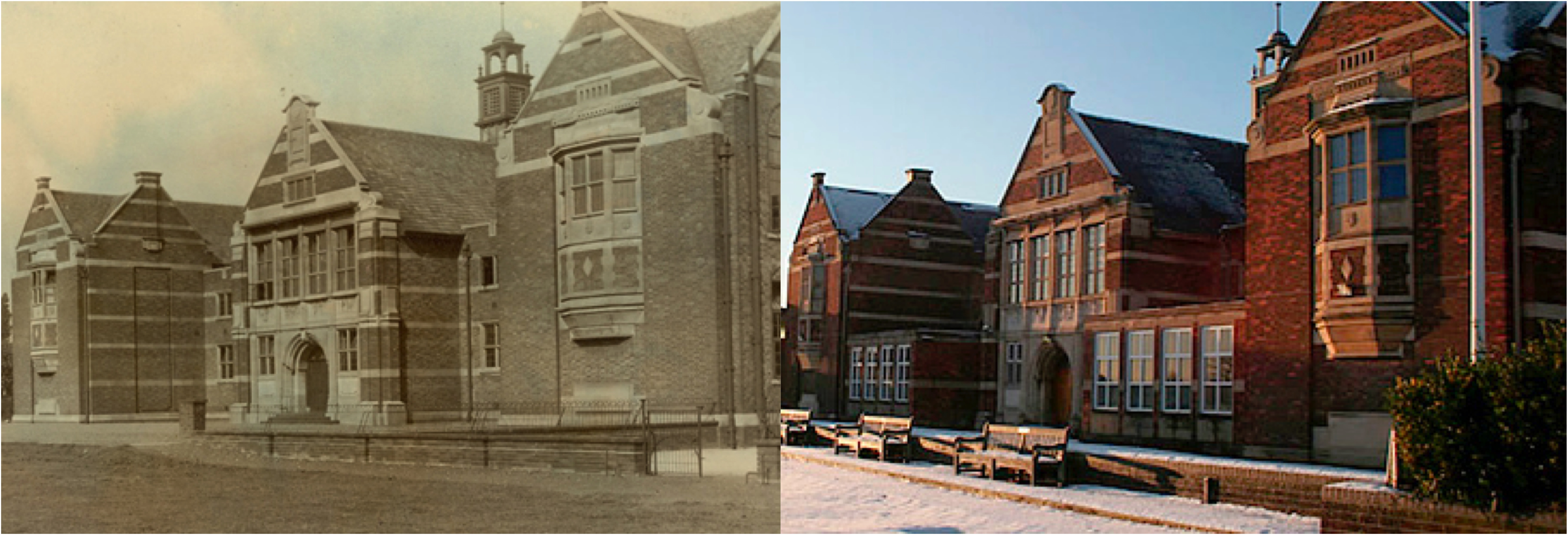
The Main School's West Face. The photo (left) was taken shortly after its construction in 1916. The photo (right) was taken in 2012.

The school was founded in 1487 by Sir Edmund Shaa, who was the Lord Mayor of London in 1482 whose will provided for a school and a small chapel in St Mary's Church in Stockport and funds to maintain a priest to chant masses and teach grammar. Alexander Lowe, the Mayor of Stockport, left the school a permanent home in Chestergate in his will. The school became increasingly successful with pupils being accepted at the ancient universities of Oxford, Cambridge and St Andrews, while the curriculum became increasingly broad with the rudiments of Greek joining a study of Latin, the Christian religion, writing in English and arithmetic. Five years after the Worshipful Company of Goldsmiths met to discuss the possibility of transferring the school to a different site, new buildings opened where Greek Street meets New Wellington Road. As well as paying for the building, the Goldsmiths also increased the salaries of the headmaster and usher and paid the running costs.

=== Move to coeducation ===
In 1980, girls were admitted to the school. They were in convent house, separated from the boys.

== School site ==
The school has been based at three main sites over the years, the first of which is St Mary's Church where it was founded in 1482, it then moved to Greek Street in 1832, and finally to the current Hallam site in 1915.

=== Greek Street ===
The Greek Street building was designed by Philip Hardwicke in 1830 and construction began later that year. The school moved from St Mary's Church in 1832, where it stayed until 1915. In 1915 the Greek Street building became unsuitable for the demands of a modern school, and the school was relocated to its present site.

=== Buxton Road ===
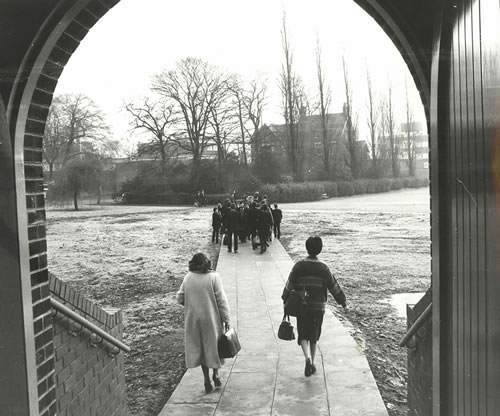
Path to Convent Site

The Hallam site was inaugurated on 29 January 1916 by the Chairman of Cheshire County Council. The Hallam Hall, seen from across the Old Quad below was named after the Mayor of Stockport and benefactor Ephraim Hallam.

==== New Woodsmoor building 2013 - present ====
In 2011, planning permission was received to erect a new teaching block on the Woodsmoor side of the site, to replace the Woodsmoor hall and laboratories that were demolished in 2010. The build was completed in June 2012, and the "black and white tower" and classics block were demolished later that year.

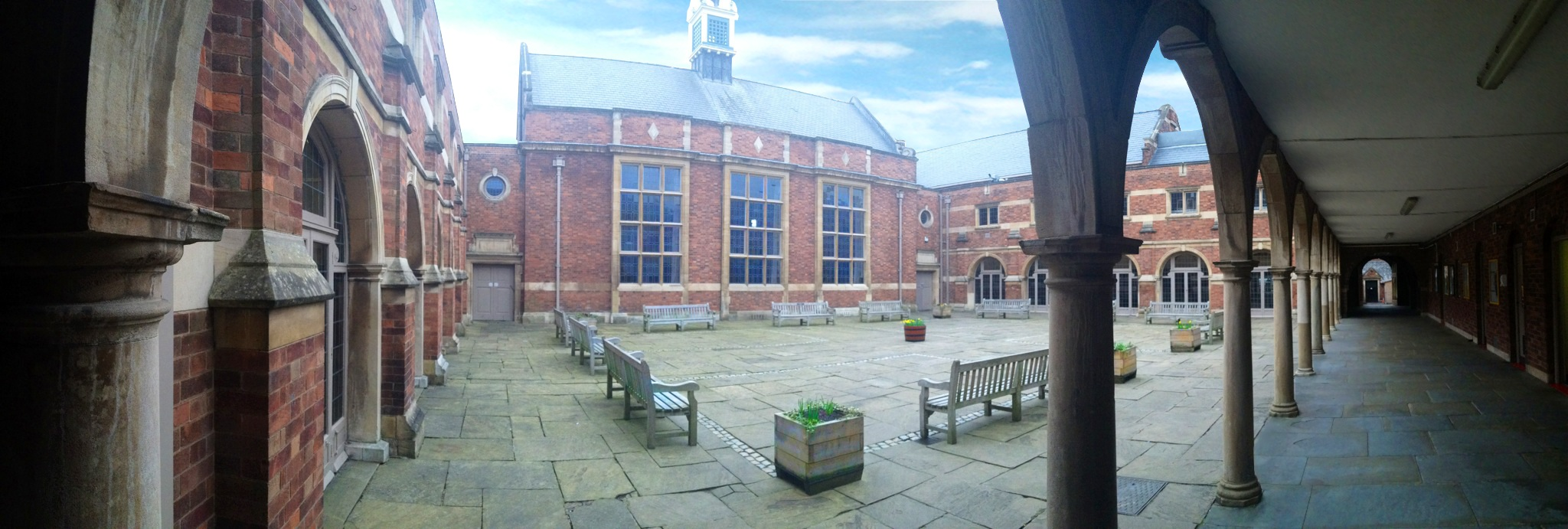
View of the Hallam Hall across the Quad

== Academic performance ==
The % of A level grades at A* and A for 2023 at Stockport Grammar was 39%. In 2025, the average grade at A-Level was B+, compared to B on average in all Stockport schools and B− average across the UK.

== Houses ==
The school has four houses which nowadays are named after benefactors of the school. The houses used to be North South, East and West before they were changed in 1949 at the same time the school replaced football with rugby. The houses compete in 3 main competitions, first is The Fallows Shield, followed by The Brown Cup and The Philpot Trophy.

=== Nicholson ===
Nicholson House, which used to be North, was named after William Nicholson of Reddish, he was the first known pupil and went on to become the head. After attending the school William attended Caius College, Cambridge, in June 1581, where he completed his B.A. and later his M.A. Due to Goldsmiths' Company records being missing there is no official date for when he became Head but it is thought to be in 1587. He later died while still in office and was buried in Stockport on 5 September 1597. In his will William left money to pay for an usher for the school, as well as some dictionaries.

=== Warren ===
Warren, known as East pre 1949, was named in honor of the Warren Family, who were Lords of the Manor of Stockport from the 13th to the 19th centuries. Sir Edward Warren, who was Baron of Stockport at the time, gave additional money to the school masters above the salary they were paid by The Goldsmiths' Company in the late 1500s. John and Edward Warren, Sir Edward Warren's descendants, arranged a payment to the school out of the manorial rates to go to the schoolmaster.

=== Arden ===
Arden was named after John Arden of Underbank Hall, an Old Stopfordian who went on to study at St Johns College, Cambridge. The Arden family (previously known as Ardene) were a wealthy Cheshire family, who claim to be one of the only families i England who can trace their make family lineage back to Anglo-Saxon times. Pre-1949 Arden was named South.

=== Vernon ===
Vernon, previousky known as West, is named after Lady Vernon who was a generous benefactor of the school. Her main gift to the school was the land on Greek Street which was used as the main school site for 83 years before they moved to their current site along the A6. Lady Vernon's grandson, the sixth Lord Vernon, endowed a Latin prize in 1874. The prize, The Lord Vernon Classical Civilisation Prize, is still running today and is given out every year at the schools speech day.

== Bursary Fund ==
A bursary provides financial assistance for pupils who may not be able to afford the fees otherwise. The school runs the bursary program on a means-tested system; the amount of the bursary depends on family income, full support is available for families earning less than £32,000 yearly.

=== Giving Day ===
Between 18 and 19 March 2026, the school hosted its very first giving day in aid of the Bursary Fund. In just 36 hours, the school raised £129,696 from 299 donors. Some of the giving day events included an inflatable obstacle course race between the houses in the Senior School. Vernon won that which meant the whole house were able to collect a tub of ice cream with their dessert on the Friday. The Junior School learnt how to play quidditch which was won by Arden. However the main event was the Head to Head battle, inspired by the BBC show Gladiators the Senior School head (Sarah Capewell) was called Sarah 'The Boss' Capewell, and the Junior School head (Mathew Copping) was called Mathew 'The Mighty' Copping. They had 3 rounds and Sarah 'The Boss' Capewell came out on top.

== Extracurricular activities ==
In their 2023 inspection, the Independent Schools Inspectorate said "Pupils experience a broad curriculum complemented by an extensive selection of co-curricular activities" and "Co-curricular activities provide opportunities for pupils to learn relaxation techniques for their physical wellness".

=== Duke of Edinburgh's Award ===
The school is its own Duke of Edinburgh's Award operating authority. In 2010, the school issued its 1000th Duke of Edinburgh Award, a milestone which was marked by the visit of Prince Edward, Earl of Wessex. Each participant’s programme is tailor-made to reflect the individuals starting point, abilities and interests.

=== Model United Nations ===
In 1985, SGS represented the USSR at the 40th anniversary Model United Nations (MUN) conference held at Central Hall, Westminster, to celebrate the first United Nations General Assembly. In 1990, the SGS delegation won the best delegation award at The Hague Model United Nations.

The school has hosted a biennial MUN conference since March 2006. At the 2008 conference, Labour MP and former home secretary David Blunkett was the school's guest speaker. At the 2012 conference, Liberal Democrat MP, Andrew Stunell was the guest speaker.

=== Expeditions ===
The school runs a series of expeditions for sixth formers every two years to places such as Venezuela, Vietnam, Uganda, Namibia, Rwanda, Honduras, Madagascar and in 2015 an expedition to Bolivia & Peru. In 2017, an expedition took 41 students to Borneo. Pupils participate in planning the trips and manage their own finances, accommodation, food and transportation.

== Publications ==
=== The Stopfordian ===
The school's annual publication is The Stopfordian, a comprehensive review of the school year. The Stopfordian covers both Junior and Senior School. A predecessor was named simply Stockport Grammar School Magazine.

=== Taking Stock ===
Taking Stock is the school’s termly magazine and it features news and photos from both the Senior and Junior Schools. First published in 1996 the magazine has 85+ issues.

=== Old Stops' Review ===
Old Stops’ Review is Stockport Grammar School's annual magazine which features news from and interviews with Old Stopfordians young and old, memories of times gone by and highlights from the past school year, as well as details on future events and how to keep in touch. It was first published in 2011.

== Old Stopfordians ==
Former pupils are known as "Old Stopfordians", not to be confused with simply Stopfordians (the demonym of Stockport being "Stopfordian"), or the former pupils of Bishop Stopford's School at Enfield, who are also known as Old Stopfordians.

=== Stopfordians Lacrosse Club ===
Stopfordians’ Lacrosse Club became a section of Disley Amalgamated Sports Club in 1987. The Stopfordian Lacrosse club merged into Norbury in 2013 and the merged club runs 3 senior teams in the North of England Leagues.

=== Old Stopfordians Golf Society ===
The Old Stopfordians’ Golf Society hold regular events where former pupils can get together. Courses they play at include Knutsford, Bramhall and Stockport Golf Clubs.

=== Notable Old Stopfordians ===
- John Amaechi (1970-), English retired NBA basketball player and broadcaster in the USA.
- David Armitage (1965-), Professor of History at Harvard University.
- Thomas Ashe (1836-1889), English poet
- Sir George Back (1796-1878), British naval officer and Arctic explorer
- Sir Victor Blank (1942-), British businessman and philanthropist.
- Peter Boardman (1950-1982), British Himalayan mountaineer and author, died on Everest
- Geoff Downes (1952-), English rock keyboard player and songwriter for the bands Yes and Asia
- Marianne Elliott (1966-), Tony Award-winning theatre director
- Peter Firth (bishop) (1929-2024), former Suffragan Bishop of Malmesbury
- Michael Gilbertson (1961-), current Archdeacon of Chester
- Roger Hammond (1936-2012), English film, television and stage actor
- Mark Isherwood (1959-), Conservative member of the National Assembly for Wales for the region of North Wales
- Chris Jones (1982-), English rugby union rugby player for The Worcester Warriors
- Cecil Kimber (1888-1945), automobile engineer, founder of The MG car company
- Sir Horace Lamb (1849-1934), British applied mathematician and author of several influential texts on classical physics
- Gordon Marsden (1953-), Labour Party politician who is the Member of Parliament (MP) for Blackpool South
- Paul Morley (1957-), English music journalist
- Samuel Perry (1877-1954), Labour Co-operative politician and father of the British tennis champion Fred Perry
- Andy Stanford-Clark (1966-), leading British information technology research engineer for IBM and IBM Master Inventor
- Di Stewart (1979-), television presenter on Sky Sports
- William Tobin (1953-2022), astronomer and political candidate
- John Turner (1943-), recorder player and former lawyer
- Sir Frederic Calland Williams (1911-1977), engineer and computer pioneer, who developed radar in World War II and the first stored-program digital computer
- Nina Métivier, a BAFTA-winning writer, producer and script editor, who co-created the teen thriller the A List
- Abigail Dean, a writer who hit the Sunday Times bestseller lists with her debut novel, Girl A

== Headteachers ==
- 1496 Sir John Randall
- 1509 Sir Randall Hulton
- 1521 Sir George Bamford
- 1534 Sir William Chorlton
- 1534–1543 Scholemaister of Stopport (name unrecorded)
- 1557 Sir William Chorlton (reappointed)
- 1559 Leonard Harrison
- 1564 Thomas Leigh
- 1565 John Brownswerd
- 1579 Bamford
- 1587 Francis Lowe
- 1597 William Nicholson
- 1597–1598 William Lingard
- 1601 Kirke
- 1601 Lang
- 1601 Nicholson
- 1601–1602 John Cobb
- 1604 Thomas Bower
- 1609 Luke Mason
- 1610 Walter Pott
- 1623 Thomas Rossen
- 1625 Reginald Pott
- 1627 Edmund Clough
- 1628 John Pollett
- 1630 William Plant
- 1633 Samuel Edwards
- 1634 Bradley Hayhurst
- 1645 Randall Yarwood
- 1647 Thomas Peirson
- 1651 Rev Thomas Coombes
- 1668 Rev Daniel Leech
- 1669 Rev Joseph Whittle
- 1673–1674 Rev Samuel Needham
- 1683 Rev Timothy Dobson
- 1691 Rev George Esclome
- 1692–1693 Rev William Dickens
- 1703 Rev Joseph Dale
- 1752 Rev William Jackson
- 1792 Rev George Porter
- 1792 Rev Elkanah Hoyle
- 1829 Rev William Newstead
- 1832 Rev Thomas Middleton
- 1847 Rev William Gurney
- 1860 Rev Charles G Hamilton
- 1887 Rev William A Pemberton
- 1903 Alfred E Daniels
- 1929 Christopher Herman Gilkes
- 1941 Frederick H Philpot
- 1962–1979 Francis Willoughby Scott
- 1979 Hugh Wright
- 1985 David Bird
- 1996–2005 Ian Mellor
- 2005–2018 Andrew Chicken
- 2018-2023 Paul Owen
- 2023-present Sarah Capewell

== See also ==
- List of the oldest schools in the United Kingdom
