= Prospective search =

Search engine feature

Prospective search, or persistent search, is a method of searching which determines which of a set of queries matches content in a corpus. Other names include document routing and percolate queries. It is sometimes called reverse search, but that can also refer to finding documents similar to a given document.

This differs from traditional, or "retrospective", search such as search engines, where the information for the results is acquired and then queried.

== Comparison to retrospective search ==
Ordinary search, also called retrospective search, starts by gathering information, indexing it, then letting users query it. A query produces results if the information is in the corpus at the time the query is issued.

In contrast, prospective search starts with the user's queries, gathers the information in a targeted way, indexes it, and then provides results as they arrive. That is, a query produces results when new information that matches it is added to the corpus.

Sometimes Ping Servers are used to gather notification of changes to websites so that the information received is as fresh as possible. Users can be notified in a number of ways of new results.

One implementation of prospective search is as saved searches which are re-run when new content is acquired.

Prospective search is well suited to queries where the results change over time, such as the current news, blogs, and trends.

== See also ==
- PubSub
- Google Alerts
- Google AppEngine Prospective Search Service (deprecated as of December 1, 2015)
- Selective dissemination of information
- Superfeedr ('tracker' API)
