= Mireo =

Company and brand

Mireo d.d.
- Founder: Leonardo Siladić (CEO), Ivica Siladić (CTO)
- Headquarters: Zagreb, Croatia
- Area served: Global
- Products: GPS navigation software, fleet management and vehicle tracking systems, maps
- Website: mireo.com

Mireo d.d. is a company and brand that produces global automotive navigation systems for smartphones, personal navigation devices and in-car infotainment systems. They also provide fleet management and vehicle tracking services and produce detailed maps of Croatia, Bosnia and Herzegovina. Mireo was founded in 2001 in Zagreb, Croatia and sells proprietary navigation products in over 70 countries.

Mireo's DON'T PANIC navigation software runs on Apple iOS, Google's Android and BlackBerry 10 smartphone/tablet operating systems and Microsoft Windows CE enabled devices and uses maps by TomTom and local providers. Mireo's Genius Maps: GPS Navigation and Offline Maps runs on Apple iOS and Google's Android smartphone/tablet operating systems and uses maps by HERE/Navteq and local providers. Both Genius Maps and DON'T PANIC support a broad selection of world languages for their user interfaces and voice instructions.
