= Guadalinex =

Spanish operating system

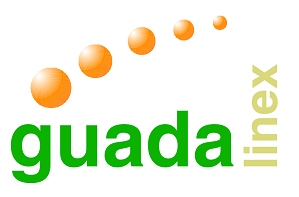
- Guadalinex logo
- OS family: Unix-like
- Working state: Discontinued
- Source model: Open source
- Initial release: February 23, 2004; 22 years ago
- Latest release: 9.0 / 21 November 2014; 12 years ago
- Kernel type: Monolithic kernel
- License: Various
- Succeeded by: EducaAndOS (in the educational space)
- Official website: www.guadalinex.org (no longer works)

Guadalinex was an Ubuntu-based operating system promoted by the government of Andalusia (Spain). It is used in schools, public libraries, centers for elderly people and Guadalinfo centers.

There were five different versions of Guadalinex:

- Guadalinex EDU (specially developed for schools by the CGA), includes Gnome Nanny
- Guadalinex CDM (for centers of elderly people)
- Guadalinex Guadalinfo (only used in Guadalinfo centers, where any person living in Andalusian rural areas can access the Internet for free)
- Guadalinex Bibliotecas (special version for public libraries)
- Guadalinex Mini (minimalistic Guadalinex distribution, suitable for old computers, and netbooks)

In 2018, the Regional Government of Andalusia discontinues Guadalinex and the planned 10th version of Guadalinex never released. (Note: This is said in the Spanish version of this Wikipedia page, however it does not have any sources. Guadalinex)

In the educational space, in around 2021, Guadalinex Edu (the education version of Guadalinex) was succeeded by EducaAndOS. (Note: First educaAndOS installation ISO was created in 2021.)

== See also ==
- CGA (Advanced Management Centre)
