= IMC Content Studio =

IMC Content Studio is an educational authoring system, especially the production of content for e-learning areas such as MOOCs. The program is developed and distributed by IMC AG, a German company based in Saarbrücken. The software is used by college and university teachers in adult education and continuing education, in particular at occupational training institutions such as Corporate Universities.

== Interface and operation ==
As is common with authoring systems, the users are usually not software experts. Therefore, authoring software programs are designed to be intuitive and easily understood. The interface of IMC Content Studio resembles the design of Microsoft products. One example is the ribbon, used in Microsoft Office since 2007 and Windows 8. The program allows the import of Microsoft PowerPoint templates and slides.

Beside producing content for e-learning, the software can be used to design graphic novels, interactive books and presentations. In addition to visual content, the program offers the option of producing audio-content via speech synthesis.

== Software ==
The software is based on HTML 5, which allows it to run on personal computers and also on tablets and smartphones.

The program is compliant with the SCORM standard drawn up by the Pentagon authority ADL for e-learning, as well as with the newer standard PENS of the AICC Committee, jointly developed by the European and US aviation industry.

The software interface is available in more than 30 languages.

The usage range varies from basic training, often with multiple choice tests, up to complex MOOCs at Corporate Universities.
