= Qarbon =

Software company

Qarbon.com, Inc.
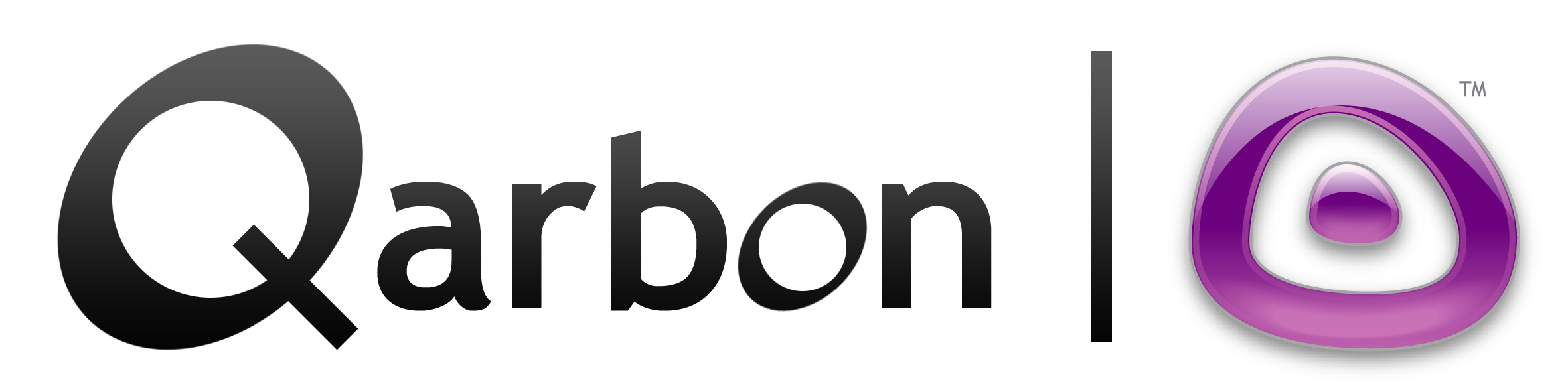
- Type: Private
- Industry: Computer software
- Founded: 1997; 29 years ago in San Jose, California
- Headquarters: San Jose, California
- Area served: Worldwide
- Products: electronic learning
- Website: www.qarbon.com

Qarbon (formerly JET Software) is a software company headquartered in San Jose, CA (United States).

Founded in 1997, they invented the concept of a Viewlet, which is now often referred to as a screencast. Using a scenario capture approach, a series of compressed screenshots and cursor positions, Qarbon’s technology enabled simulated playback of any software application. By allowing users to edit these scenarios, they could be augmented to create interactive Viewlets, the output of the process. The very first Viewlet output format was a Java applet, but as technology advanced, the decision was made to switch to an .swf (also known as Adobe Flash) format for better cross-platform support.

== Products ==
Qarbon is most widely recognized for its flagship ViewletBuilder product, a cross-platform software simulation/tutorial builder. The Qarbon family of products also include ViewletQuiz, ViewletCam, ViewletPoll and ViewletCentral. Qarbon's electronic learning software applications generate SCORM and AICC compliant Flash content (screencasts, simulations and interactive assessments) for delivery via email and CD or on web sites and Learning Management Systems. ViewletCentral, a Viewlet hosting server-based system created by Qarbon, allows Viewlets to be stored, managed and deployed while gathering Viewlet users’ utilization statistics.

== Customers ==
Many Fortune 500 companies have used Qarbon’s products. Qarbon’s customers include, Microsoft, Deutsche Bank, Siemens, Procter & Gamble, IBM, Boeing, Coca-Cola, Cisco Systems, Oracle Corporation, Google, The Home Depot, Target, and Apple Inc. Qarbon serves customers across the globe with partners in Africa, Asia, Australia, New Zealand, Europe, India, Latin America and the Middle East.

== Intellectual Property ==
Patent number: 6404441

Patent number: 7360159

The most notable patent infringement claim was against eHelp's RoboDemo product. Macromedia acquired eHelp and this product shortly after the claim was filed and in 2005 they were acquired by Adobe Systems. RoboDemo was renamed and re-introduced as Adobe Captivate. Qarbon has also filed claims against InstallShield, Bernard D & G, and Macrovision.

== Related file formats and extensions ==
Ext.	Explanation
.qvp	ViewletBuilder project files which can be edited with the ViewletBuilder Pro or ViewletBuilder Enterprise software.
.qvpx	XML-based project file format used by newer versions of ViewletBuilder (introduced in version 7).
.vie	ViewletQuiz project files which can be edited with the ViewletQuiz or ViewletBuilder Enterprise software.
.viex	XML-based project file format used by newer versions of ViewletQuiz (introduced in version 4).
.vcp	Viewletcam project files which can be edited with the ViewletCam software.

== See also ==
- Proxim Wireless
- Nile
