= Artificial intelligence in eLearning =

Artificial intelligence in eLearning refers to the application of computational systems and machine learning techniques to support, enhance, and automate processes within digital education ecosystems.

The eLearning ecosystem is composed of multiple interconnected layers that collectively support the creation, distribution, management, delivery, governance, and optimization of digital learning experiences. These include learning content creation systems, authoring tools, learning management systems, course marketplaces, public education infrastructures, learner analytics systems, assessment mechanisms, adaptive learning technologies, tutoring systems, and governance frameworks.

== Artificial intelligence integration in eLearning ==
=== Content creation and authoring systems ===
Artificial intelligence has increasingly been integrated into digital learning content production systems. Early eLearning authoring tools such as Articulate 360, Adobe Captivate, Lectora, and iSpring Suite supported manual creation of slide-based lessons, assessments, and SCORM-compliant materials.

During the 2020s, generative AI expanded these systems through automated lesson drafting, quiz generation, translation, voice synthesis, and multimedia script creation. AI-assisted course creation platforms such as Coursebox and LearnWorlds AI accelerated instructional design through document ingestion, summarization, and automated structuring of learning materials.

General-purpose large language models including ChatGPT, Claude, Gemini, and Microsoft Copilot are also widely used to generate instructional text, exercises, and lesson outlines via conversational interfaces. Unlike traditional learning management systems, these tools generally operate outside formal curriculum management and interoperability standards such as SCORM.

More recent AI-native authoring systems integrate content generation with adaptive learning logic, simulations, analytics, and conversational design interfaces, combining creation and instructional intelligence within a single environment. Some platforms, including Mexty, integrate vibe coding with learning management and content development functions. These may include tools for editing, version control, content reuse, testing, accessibility support, SCORM/LMS compatibility, quality assurance, template management, and deployment of interactive learning materials.

== Learning delivery systems ==
Artificial intelligence has also been incorporated into learning delivery platforms, including learning management systems (LMS), online learning marketplaces, and public education infrastructures.

Learning management systems such as Moodle, Canvas LMS, Blackboard, Docebo, and Cornerstone originally focused on course administration, learner tracking, and content distribution. AI integration later introduced predictive analytics, recommendation systems, automated grading, conversational assistants, and adaptive learning pathways.

Online learning platforms including Coursera, Udemy, Khan Academy, and LinkedIn Learning apply machine learning to personalize course recommendations, optimize learning pathways, and enable adaptive assessments or tutoring features.

Public education systems and academic institutions increasingly use AI for accessibility support, intelligent tutoring, automated feedback generation, and personalized remediation. However, adoption remains uneven due to concerns over academic integrity, algorithmic bias, privacy, and regulatory compliance.

== Adaptive learning and analytics ==
Adaptive learning and learning analytics represent some of the earliest and most established applications of artificial intelligence in education. Early systems analyzed learner behavior, engagement patterns, and assessment results to enable personalized instruction and competency-based progression.

Platforms such as Knewton, DreamBox, Carnegie Learning, and ALEKS implemented machine learning models for adaptive sequencing and real-time personalization. Later developments extended these systems to include predictive analytics, intelligent tutoring systems, learner profiling, and automated performance forecasting.

Adaptive learning is widely regarded in the literature as a core application area of AI in education, particularly for personalization and performance optimization.

== Governance, compliance, and responsible AI ==
The expansion of artificial intelligence in eLearning increased attention toward governance, transparency, and regulatory compliance. Educational institutions and enterprises adopted frameworks associated with data privacy, cybersecurity, accessibility, and responsible AI deployment, including GDPR, the European Union AI Act, ISO/IEC 27001, SOC 2, and WCAG standards.

Some AI systems introduced constrained-generation models based on verified institutional datasets, sometimes described as “source of truth” architectures, to reduce inaccuracies and improve governance oversight. Policy discussions have also emphasized regional AI infrastructure and European AI sovereignty initiatives.
