= ISpring Suite =

PowerPoint-based authoring toolkit

iSpring Suite
- Release: 2001; 25 years ago
- Operating system: Microsoft Windows
- Type: Educational software, Presentation software, Authoring tools
- License: Proprietary
- Website: ispringsolutions.com/ispring-suite

iSpring Suite is a PowerPoint-based authoring toolkit produced by iSpring Solutions that allows users to create slide-based courses, quizzes, dialog simulations, screencasts, video lectures, and other interactive learning materials. The output courses are published in HTML5. iSpring-made courses are compatible with the following LMS standards: SCORM 1.2, SCORM 2004, AICC, xAPI (Tin Can), and cmi5.

== History ==
In 2005, Flashspring Pro, the prototype of all iSpring products, was released. It was a simple PowerPoint-to-Flash converter with free and commercial versions. Later, iSpring released Flashspring Ultra and SCORM compatibility became available. The companion products FlashSpring Lite and FlashSpring Server were released in 2006 and 2007, respectively. In 2008 the name was changed to iSpring.

=== iSpring Suite 7 ===
One enhancement made to iSpring Suite 7 was the support of combined, cross-platform Flash + HTML5 format. It allowed users to create mobile-ready projects that adapt to any screen size and orientation.

iSpring Suite 7 came with free mobile apps for iOS and Android, which allow offline content viewing. The apps collect statistics on learning activity even with no Internet connection and send them to an LMS once the connection is restored.

=== iSpring Suite 8 ===
iSpring Suite 8 introduces several new features to the toolkit.

In version 8, a conversation simulator was added, allowing users to create simulated dialogues. Also, iSpring Suite 8 has a screen recording tool, allowing users to capture the screen and insert the recording on a PowerPoint slide, an audio/video editor both for screen recordings and audio/video narrations, and a video lecture player to show PowerPoint slides and lecture video side by side.

=== iSpring Suite 9 ===
Released in April 2018, the 9th version introduced 14 new interactions, a new built-in video editor with extended capabilities for screen recording, and major improvements of the quiz editor: the new drag and drop question, the new built-in equation editor, extended feedback options, and 7 new survey question templates. The other feature of iSpring Suite 9 is it can merge LMS projects easily.

=== iSpring Suite 10 ===
Released in September 2020, the 10 version is also known as iSpring Suite Max. In this version, the iSpring Cloud has been replaced by iSpring Space (authors collaboration tool). It also added the iSpring Page, a Micro-learning course authoring tool. It is a kind of online authoring tool but with a limited quiz/question type.

=== iSpring Suite 11 ===
iSpring Suite 11 that was launched on September 1, 2022, includes new design customization features, as well as preset course player templates. This release also introduced the ability to adjust course playback speed, gave interactive role-plays a new look, and expanded Content Library. The collection of eLearning assets has been enriched with illustrated characters and locations.

== Features ==
iSpring Suite includes 5 authoring components: the iSpring add-in, a quiz editor, a conversation simulator, a screen recording tool and an interaction editor — a set of standalone tools that can be used both separately and together. Additional components available in the publishing interface are PowerPoint-to-Video/YouTube (available separately as iSpring River), and iSpring Cloud hosting and sharing platform.

iSpring Converter Pro converts PowerPoint presentations into online presentations. It supports the standard PowerPoint features such as animation, transition effects and narration facilities.

== See also ==
- E-Learning
- Rapid learning
- Authoring system
- List of learning management systems
- Comparison of screencasting software
