= Rapid learning =

Rapid learning (or Rapid eLearning Development) has traditionally referred to a methodology to build e-learning courses rapidly. Typically the author will create slides in PowerPoint, record audio and video narration on top of the slides, and then use software to add tests, or even collaboration activities between the slides. The whole package is then sent, most often as an Adobe Flash file, to a learning management system or website.

E-learning has grown rapidly since the 1990s but developers and organizations were confronted by the complexity of authoring processes. The difficulty and expense of building online courses from scratch led to the idea of recycling existing resources like PowerPoint presentations and transforming them into e-learning courses. A traditional e-learning development project can take several months. In contrast the aim of rapid e-learning is to build and roll out content modules within weeks. For example, while one hour of standard e-learning can take 73 to 220 hours to develop, a PowerPoint to e-learning conversion can be estimated to take an average of 33 hours to develop.

The term "rapid learning" is also sometimes used as a synonym for "short-form" or "bite-size" learning. In this usage, it refers not to how rapidly a module can be created by an e-learning developer, but how rapidly it can be viewed by a learner.

== Software ==
Several rapid learning software applications with varying capabilities are on the market. Most of them are authoring tools that include rapid learning as a feature.

Some of these tools treat each slide as a learning object and allow to add tests and online activities between the slides. Some of these software are online services, the others are desktop applications to install on your computer.

A trend of the market is also to combine rapid learning (conversion of PowerPoint presentations) with video or screencast (filming your screen and your mouse movements) so as to provide both a sequence of slides and applications demos. This combination is particularly powerful when authoring courses on how to use a software.

== Best practice ==
Rapid learning development is now an integral part of the authoring practice worldwide. Some authors and consulting companies focus on how to reach the optimal compromise between the economic need for rapid learning and the pedagogical objective of a good instructional design. Best practice recommendations include:

- proceed to needs analysis and instructional design before building the online course so as to define the required learning activities to integrate in the course
- needs analysis should decide whether the course is a blended learning course or all online
- instructional design should decide which part of the course are online, which parts are face-to-face
- articulate PowerPoint-based content with tests and online activities
- web 2.0 tools and learning management systems allow to blend content modules created through rapid learning tools with rich interaction activities. The content modules make sense only if completing an interaction scenario or appearing as the feedback of tests and case studies
- using PowerPoint to build the course structure but rely on mindmapping to present the information in a more synthetic and visual way

== Limits ==
After 2000, a series of rapid learning tools were proposed on the market and became popular because of their simplicity and the feeling that anyone could build an e-learning course from a simple PowerPoint presentation. Some experts have highlighted the limits of this method or even insisted on the fact that rapid learning was the consequence of the misapprehension that if a face-to-face course worked well with PowerPoint, it would function equally well online. This criticism of rapid learning development focuses on the idea that the richness of an interaction with students in the classroom is not encapsulated in a PowerPoint presentation file. Consequently, an online course is a mere passive information presentation but not a training activity with questions, workshops, problems. Rapid learning has been criticized for ignoring the axiom that people "learn by doing". More globally, the critics of rapid learning have followed the same track as the critics on the use of PowerPoint in education.

The success of rapid learning has an economic reason. Many developers and organizations are able for the first time to build their online course without the help of an e-learning team (including instructional designers, art designers and other contributors). The overall evolution of internet practice and the development of the Web 2.0 collaboration scenarios might lead trainers to other scenarios. Rapid learning is seen an inheritance of the CD-ROM model and the idea that e-learning consists in an individual self-paced practice.

Students often complain that self-paced individual learning can be unengaging and offers little chances of interaction, correction and success. This can be overcome through scenarios where the information is presented as rapid learning modules encapsulated in Flash SCORM packages or distributed on Learning Management Systems, and the learning activities developed through other tools, such as blogs, wikis, forums or videoconferences.

== See also ==
- ActivePresenter
- Chamilo
- Electronic learning
- Instructional design
- iSpring Suite
- PowerPoint
- Screencast
- Rapid application development
