= Educaplay =

Online educational platform

- Original authors: Alfredo Anaya; José Luis del Rincón
- Developers: Create Play & Learn
- Release: 2010
- Operating system: Cross-platform (web browser)
- Available in: Multilingual
- Type: Educational platform
- License: Freemium
- Website: www.educaplay.com

Educaplay is an online educational platform that allows users to create and share gamified learning activities. It was launched in 2010 by the Spanish company ADR Formación. The platform is based on game-based learning methodology and is aimed at teachers, students, and training professionals. In 2020, UNESCO's Regional Office for Latin America and the Caribbean included it among recommended tools for teachers during the COVID-19 pandemic, alongside platforms such as Kahoot!, Quizizz, and Socrative.

== History ==
Originally built on Adobe Flash, Educaplay was migrated to HTML5. The platform has been presented at education industry events such as Expoelearning in Madrid.

== Features ==
The platform enables creation of interactive educational activities based on HTML5, accessible through any web browser without software installation.

=== Activity types ===
Educaplay offers crossword puzzles, word searches, multiple-choice quizzes, dictations, dialogues, fill-in-the-blank exercises, interactive maps, memory games, letter and word ordering, column and group matching, word wheel, video quizzes, and interactive presentations.

=== LMS integration ===
Activities are compatible with SCORM and LTI standards, enabling integration with learning management systems such as Moodle, Canvas, or Blackboard.

== Academic research ==
A quasi-experimental study with 70 students in Ecuador, published in Cátedra (SciELO), found statistically significant improvements in academic performance compared to conventional methods. Research in European Public & Social Innovation Review documented improvements in English vocabulary retention.

However, a study on primary education in Indonesia (Jurnal Cakrawala Pendas) concluded that implementation faces obstacles including limited technological infrastructure and insufficient digital literacy among teachers. Most available studies have methodological limitations such as small sample sizes and short intervention periods.

== Business model ==
Educaplay operates under a freemium model. The free plan allows unlimited activities with advertising. Paid plans remove ads and add LMS integration.

== Reception ==
INTEF (Spanish Ministry of Education) has reviewed the platform. TeachersFirst (U.S.) highlighted its variety of activity types. UNESCO included it as a recommended tool. Spanish newspapers La Vanguardia and ABC have covered it, and Educación 3.0 featured it in teacher tool guides.

In Latin America, the Government of Guanajuato (Mexico) documented its use in teacher training programs. Limitations include internet dependency and advertising in the free plan. Studies in developing countries point to adoption difficulties due to the digital divide.

== See also ==
- Gamification
- Game-based learning
- Educational technology
- Learning management system
