= National Learning Network =

UK repository of online learning materials

The National Learning Network (NLN) was a UK national partnership programme designed to increase the uptake of Information Learning Technology (ILT) across the learning and skills sector in England. Supported by the Learning and Skills Council and other sector bodies, the NLN provided network infrastructure and a wide-ranging programme of support, information and training, as well as the NLN Materials − a substantial range of e-learning content. The initiative began in 1999 with the aim of helping to transform post-16 education. The Government's total investment in the NLN totalled £156 million over a five-year period.

Although the network itself is no longer operational, the main output of the initiative − the NLN Materials − continues to represent a wide-ranging collection of e-learning materials in the UK. Freely available to the post-16 sector, they are still actively promoted and updated.

The name National Learning Network is also the name of several centres in Ireland for people with physical and Intellectual disabilities.

== History ==
The seeds for the UK's National Learning Network (NLN) were sown in the spring of 1999 through the collaboration of the Further Education Funding Council for England (FEFC), the Higher Education Funding Council for England (HEFCE) and agencies like Becta, NILTA, FEDA and Jisc. This government-funded project resulted in three main developments:

- The Joint Information Services Committee (JISC) that had been managing the Joint Academic Network (JANET) on behalf of UK Universities and Research Councils would now be part-funded by the Further Education Funding Council. Consequently, all UK Colleges of Further Education would be connected to the JANET network and benefit from the data sets and learning resources available through it.
- Support for the newly connected colleges would be provided by the JISC Regional Support Centres (RSC), set up by university and college partnerships to cover all FEFC funding areas. The RSCs' initial brief was to manage the connection of FE colleges to the JANET network, train local IT staff and provide high level technical support.
- A massive programme of learning materials development would be set up under the name of National Learning Network (NLN) to enable Further Education and the Adult and Community Learning (ACL) sectors to make best use of JANET and the enhanced ICT resources that these sectors enjoyed. A substantial body of work was developed by colleges, universities and commercial organisations and were made available to all qualifying parties. NLN has played a significant role in the adoption of Information and Learning Technology (ILT) by the post-16 education sectors in the UK.

== NLN Materials ==
Four rounds of interactive learning materials were commissioned and authored under the NLN banner, covering a wide range of academic and vocational topics. The last body of work − Round 4, adding to the 800 hours of materials already available, was aimed at the Adult and Community Learning sector, covering four main topics: Family Learning, English for Speakers of Other Languages, Learning to Learn, and Making Learning Work for You. These materials were made available from winter 2005. Round 1 and 2 of the materials were substantially updated during April to July 2006.

The materials are designed to be used in a variety of formats and delivery platforms, including within a Virtual Learning Environment (VLE). To facilitate this, all NLN materials have been packaged as Scorm Learning Objects, with metadata. Most of the LOs can be disaggregated into multiple Shareable Content Objects, and to varying degrees modified and repurposed by practitioners. In total, the NLN Materials consist of 2251 Learning Objects, 800 hours of learning, and have been used in around a third of UK FE institutions, as well as commercial and offender learning contexts.

Xtensis ltd. originally took a consultancy role in the project, gradually increasing their role to hosting the materials to practitioners in the ACL sector, then to all sectors, also introducing a download format that includes a navigational wrapper allowing the materials to be distributed and used on CD/DVD/intranet, while still being valid Scorm Content Packages.

Although most of the institutions involved in their creation have since been disbanded, the materials are still well used. Since 2015, authority of the NLN Materials service has passed to the Education and Training Foundation, with the materials hosted within Xtensis's social bookmarking site XtLearn.net which still allows direct access and independent download, but also enables mixing with other content sources from around the web into content collections.
