= ILT =

ILT may stand for:

- Instructor-led training
- Information Learning Technology
- Gallid alphaherpesvirus 1
- Inverse lithography technology
- Invercargill Licensing Trust
- International League T20, Twenty20 cricket tournament in the United Arab Emirates
- Inverse Laplace transform
- Instructional Leadership Team
