= TALQ Protocol =

- Developed by: TALQ Consortium
- Introduced: 2012
- Industry: Smart City, IoT
- Website: talq-consortium.org

The TALQ Protocol is an interface standard for smart city device networks, enabling interoperability between central management software (CMS) and outdoor device networks (ODN) from different vendors.

== TALQ Protocol ==
The TALQ Smart City Protocol (TALQ Protocol/TALQ Specification) is a communication protocol enabling the connection of various different outdoor device networks (ODN) with a central management software (CMS). The protocol is defined with the OpenAPI Specification, it follows the RESTful approach with JSON data and is built on TCP/IP and HTTPS.

It was originally a protocol for smart street lighting, but later expanded to include other smart city applications. The protocol is considered a global standard for smart city/IoT and the authority of the TALQ standard has been acknowledged internationally.

=== History ===
TALQ was created in 2012 to address and solve issues within outdoor lighting systems; unifying the languages used between the physical devices (e.g.: lamp post, luminaire controller), and the CMS, as different manufacturers used different protocols within outdoor lighting networks (OLN). TALQ introduced the TALQ Bridge (later called Gateway) which identifies the OLN and translates the information to the CMS.

Later, in 2017, the objective broadened to include other smart city applications as well. In 2021, the TALQ Protocol was released as a public resource on GitHub.

=== Development and operating principle ===
The TALQ Gateway represents the ODN data and translates this information into messages that can be understood by the CMS. These messages are created as per the TALQ data model and expressed in JSON.

TALQ is network technology-agnostic within the ODN, it provides a common interface represented by the Gateway and the CMS. The functionality of a physical device, like a luminaire controller for a streetlamp, is represented by a set of functions with associated attributes and events. An example function for a luminaire controller is the LampActuator function, in which the commands and events associated attributes are contained. The TALQ Protocol provides several such functions. When designing a new physical device, these functions can be used, or new vendor-specific functions can be designed by extending previously existing ones.

These vendor-specific functions enable differentiation between manufacturers.

=== Features ===
This protocol is not only limited to lighting, but can also be used for other smart city applications such as waste and parking space management, traffic monitoring, energy management or environmental data collection. The supported features include, among others, scheduling, sensor-based control, configuration, monitoring, asset management, event handling, energy savings, failure notifications, and maintenance optimization.

When establishing smart city applications like traffic monitoring, waste management, or smart street lighting, the TALQ standard enables cities and utilities to avoid vendor lock-in by having the choice among various compatible systems.

== TALQ Consortium ==
The TALQ Consortium was founded in 2012 by the six lighting companies Philips (since renamed Signify N.V.), Zumtobel, Schréder, Harvard Engineering, Streetlight Vision (since acquired by Itron Inc.) and Kingsun. In the following years, further companies joined the consortium, and in 2021, the consortium reached 50 members. The objective of the consortium was to advance the outdoor lighting market by creating a standardized communication protocol for smart street lighting.

The consortium's areas of responsibility are the management and further evolution of the TALQ Smart City Protocol. This includes delivery and governance of the interface specification, as well as management of its promotion and approving compliance with a certification procedure.

In its certification process, the consortium evaluates manufacturers' adherence to the TALQ interface standard for both completeness and correctness, utilizing the online TALQ certification tool (TCT) to ensure robust implementation. To use the TCT and receive certifications, vendors have to join the consortium. Since 2017, manufacturers of products that have successfully integrated the standard have been approved and officially certified by the consortium.

The consortium is a member program of the IEEE Industry Standards and Technology Organization (IEEE-ISTO), a non-profit organization for the development of standards within technology industry consortia, trade associations, and other similar entities.
