= Authoring software =

Authoring software can refer to:

- Optical disc authoring, software to create media on CDs and DVDs
- Authoring system, software made so non-programmers can produce content, usually for educational use
