= WebWeaver Suite =

Learning management system

WebWeaver
- Developer: DigiOnline GmbH
- Stable release: 6
- Platform: PHP
- Available in: German, English, other
- Type: Learning management system
- Licence: commercial
- Website: www.webweaver.info www.webweaver-school.de

WebWeaver is a commercial web-based Learning management system. This software has been developed and distributed by the German company DigiOnline GmbH including a variety of tools that allow and enhance communication and collaboration of those involved in education. Part of WebWeaver is a Content Management System (CMS), which is used for building and maintenance of websites.

== History ==
Work began in 1999 with the initial objective of the developers being to support teachers and educational staff in their first steps towards the collaborative usage of new digital media and provide them with a secure online environment. The further development of the software was driven by the educational and organisational needs of various educational institutions. This institution-oriented approach has been pursued by WebWeaver in its standard version since 2004.

Since 2011 WebWeaver is developed and distributed in two product lines : WebWeaver School for the school sector and WebWeaver as a customizable software for lifelong learning.

== Idea ==
The learning platform in its standard version includes the following areas: Private (personal desktop), Institution (tools for all members of an educational institution as well as internal groups and classes), Community (overarching tools as well as open and closed groups for all members of the platform), eLearning (online courses) and eContent (data distribution). The current goals of the platform are:

- to provide institutions with internal workspace including secure communication channels and collaborative data storage (Intranet),
- to support collaboration across the institutions,
- to promote and enhance the individual and collaborative learning.

== Tools ==
The standard version of WebWeaver includes the following tools:

- Address book
- Administration of resources
- Bill board
- Blogs
- Bookmarks
- Bulletin board
- Calendar
- Chat
- Courselet (creating and playing learning contents)
- File storage
- Forms
- Forum
- Learning plan
- Learning diary
- Learning progress check
- Mail Service (Webmail)
- Mailing lists
- Member lists
- Messenger
- Notices
- Photo album
- Polls
- Profile
- Project bourse
- Ressources
- Showcase
- Task
- Timetable
- Websites
- Wikis

== Application areas ==
The software is mainly used as a learning and community platform for educational purposes. It served as a technical base for the cost-free learning platform used in German schools lo-net² [www.lo-net2.de] and for the learning platform from the Swiss educational server lo-net² and for the learning platform from the Swiss educational server. WebWeaver also serves as learning, communication and working platform qualiboXX of the Federal Institute for Vocational Education and Training (BIBB) qualiboXX. The German Adult Education Association offers to its members the cloud service vhs.cloud as well as the learning portal vhs-Lernportal, both based on WebWeaver.

== Desktop tool ==
The web-based software is complemented with WebWeaver Desktop, which can be installed on the user’s computer as any other desktop tool. The tool includes a messenger, enables an easy access to the data storages of the platform using drag & drop as well as other features such as an administration tool. In 2022 DigiOnline launched the App WebWeaver for Windows as a new file manager.

== Mobile access ==
Apps for iOS and Android include a messenger and a mail service as well as file manager.
