= PENS (software) =

Content update notification protocol standard

PENS (Package Exchange Notification Services) is a content update notification protocol standard created by the AICC (Aviation Industry Computer-Based Training Committee).

Using PENS, a content system notifies the server that a package is available for collection. The content system can be an authoring tool or a content management system. A PENS compatible server then collects and processes the package, which can use existing content packaging formats, such as AICC course interchange files, SCORM 1.2 and SCORM 2004. The PENS server could be a learning management (LMS) or content management server (CMS) system. Finally, as the content is processed, the server can automatically inform the developer or other systems of workflow progress or report any problems via messages which can be sent by HTTP or email.

Since 2014 AICC has dissolved and transferred all of its documents to ADL.

== See also ==
- AICC
