= XAPI =

XAPI may refer to:

- Experience API (Tin Can API), an e-learning software specification that allows programmatic inclusion of the learning content
- XAPI management toolstack, a Xen Cloud Platform interface for hypervisor management and configuration of virtual machines
