= Service Interoperability in Ethernet Passive Optical Networks =

- Founded: December 2009
- Type: Standards working group
- Website: ieee1904.org

The Service Interoperability in Ethernet Passive Optical Networks (SIEPON) working group proposed the IEEE 1904.1 standard for managing telecommunications networks.

== Description ==
Ethernet passive optical network (EPON) is a technology for fiber to the x access networks, with millions subscriber lines. In response to rapid growth, the SIEPON project was formed in 2009 to develop system-level specifications, targeting "plug-and-play" interoperability of the transport, service, and control planes in a multi-vendor environment.

The project was organized to build upon the IEEE 802.3ah (1G-EPON) and IEEE 802.3av (10G-EPON) physical layer and data link layer standards and create a system-level and network-level standard, allowing interoperability of the transport, service, and control planes in a multi-vendor environment. The "P" prefix is used while the standard is being proposed, and then dropped when ratified. A draft standard was announced in September 2011. The Industry Standards and Technology Organization announced a conformity assessment program in February 2012. The first official standard in the series, IEEE Standard 1904.1-2013, was published in September 2013.
