= Training management system =

Software application

A training management system (TMS), training management software, or training resource management system (TRMS) is a software application for the administration, documentation, tracking, and reporting of instructor-led-training programs. It is primarily used by corporate training administrators to manage and streamline various aspects of training activities, including session registration, course administration, and compliance tracking.

A TMS can function as a standalone system or be integrated with other enterprise solutions such as enterprise resource planning (ERP) systems, Learning Management Systems (LMS), and Learning Record Stores (LRS). The goal of a TMS is to optimise and automate training-related processes, enhancing efficiency and improving overall organisational training effectiveness.

== Purpose and Use ==
The primary purpose of a TMS is to manage back-office processes associated with training programs. This typically includes the administration of instructor-led-training sessions, tracking learner progress, scheduling and managing instructors, and reporting on training outcomes.

TMS systems are critical for organisations that conduct frequent training programs, as they help reduce administrative overhead, improve compliance reporting, and enhance the learner experience. Key functionalities of TMS solutions typically include:

- Session registration. The ability to register, cancel or transfer learners for training programmes, track registration statuses, and manage waiting lists.
- Course and resource administration. Outlining session content, managing course calendars, managing resources such training rooms and instructors.
- Tracking and reporting. Monitoring learner progress and certificate expiration dates, generating performance reports, and analysing training effectiveness.
- Compliance training and management. Ensuring that training programs meet regulatory requirements, especially in industries such as healthcare, manufacturing, and finance.
- Financial management. Budget forecasting, cost-tracking, and invoicing for paid courses.

TMS solutions can be used across various sectors, including government, healthcare, finance, education, and manufacturing, among others. They are often employed to manage both internal employee training programs as well as external client or customer training.

TMSs can be complemented by other learning technologies, such as a learning management system for e-learning management and course delivery.

== Technical aspects ==
Most modern TMS solutions are web-based, providing users with easy access from any location with an internet connection. Initially, many TMS solutions were designed to be locally hosted on-premise, requiring organizations to purchase a license and install the software on their own servers. However, with the increasing adoption of cloud technologies, many TMS providers now offer their software as Software as a Service (SaaS), with hosting and maintenance managed by the vendor.

== See also ==
- Learning Record Store
- Student information system
