= Australian Computers in Education Conference =

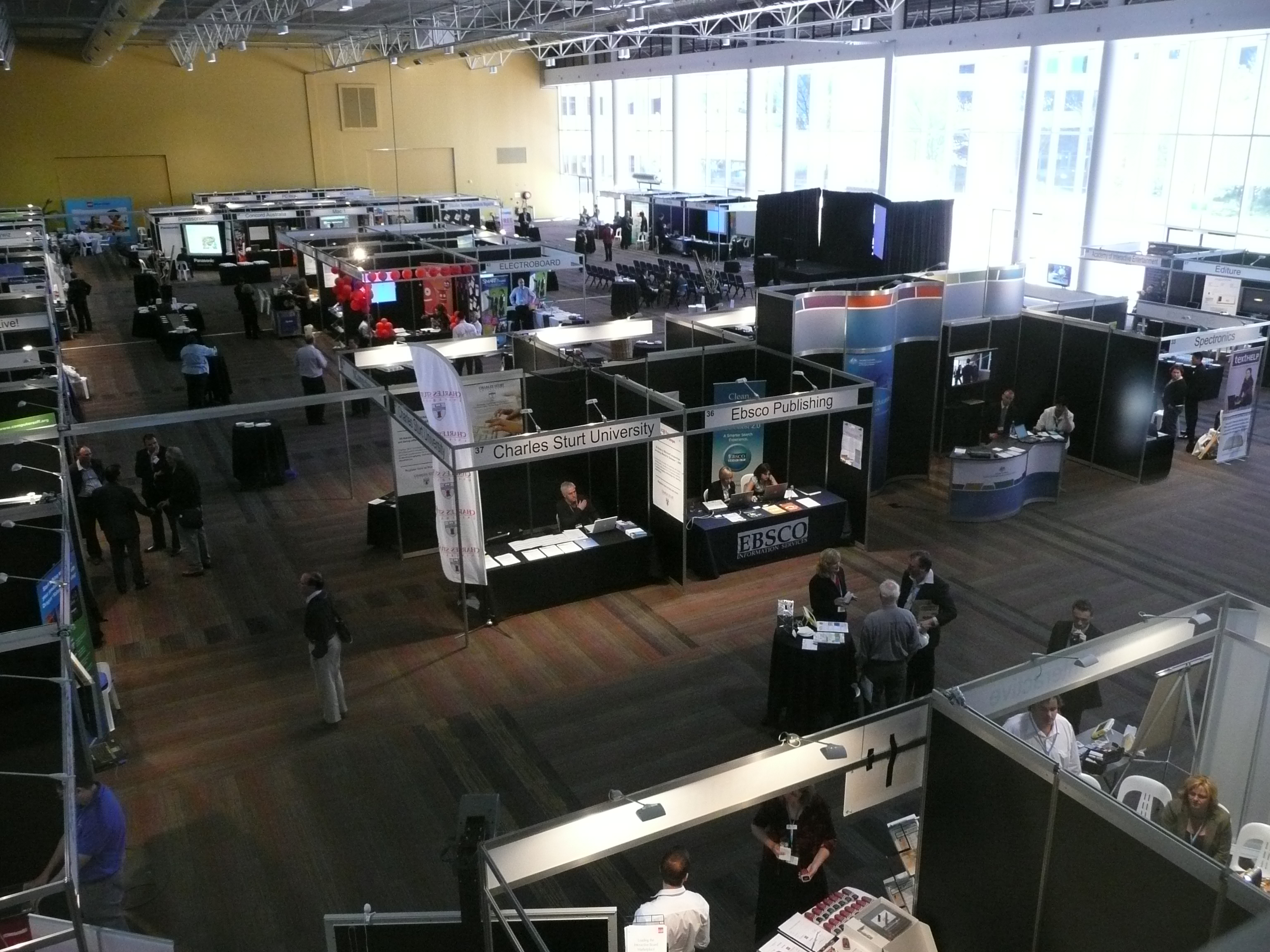
- Abbreviation: ACEC

Publication details
- Publisher: Australian Council for Computers in Education
- History: Inaugurated on October 10, 1986
- Frequency: Biennial
- Website: www.acce.edu.au

This National Conference is the biennial conference of the Australian Council for Computers in Education (ACCE). The conference opens to anyone who in interested in sharing their digital teaching experiences. The first conference took place in Melbourne, 1983. Between 1983 and 1996, the conference was held annually across Australia. After 1996, the conference became biennial. From 1994, a series of frameworks were launched in Australia to integrate Information and Communication Technology (ICT) into education. Western Australia's 2001 Competency framework for Teachers identified teachers as an important component in developing computer education. In 2010, Education Minister Julia Gillard, proposed an education agenda to provide Australia a better education system. Besides ACCE, there are many organizations and conferences supporting the development of computer education in Australia. Technology in education consists of two major approaches: Learning with technology and learning from technology. Technology in education learning and traditional classroom learning have different focuses and defining features. There are also four types of computer education: Bring your own device(BYOD), blended learning, online learning, and flipped learning.

== Purpose ==
The Australian Computers in Education Conference (ACEC) is open to anyone in the education field that wishes to share their digital experiences and is interested in using ICT to promote and enhance classroom learning. The conference aims to oversee the global trends and activities and compare them to the work accomplished by the Australian Computers in Education groups.

== History ==
The first conference (labelled as ACEC) took place in Melbourne in 1983. Since that time it has continued to provide teachers around the country a forum to exchange information on classroom activity, make connections with each other, and learn from experts in the field. The conference proceedings provide an insight into the nature of educational computing practice since the early 1980s and the papers are widely cited in the research field literature.

The conference was formalized in 1985. A meeting of Victoria Computer Education Group state presidents was held in Melbourne in November. A constitution was formulated, a secretariat was established, and the National Committee for Computers in Education took on a new name: the Australian Council for Computers in Education (ACCE). The meeting also decided to establish a national journal, Australian Educational Computing, under an editorial board.

The 5th conference was held in Adelaide in September 1987. It was hosted by the Conference in Education Group of South Australia. The major theme of the conference was Tomorrow's Technology Today. Within the major theme, there were a number of strands being addressed: special education, computer graphics, computer and equity, and staff development and teacher training.

The 11th conference was held in Brisbane in July 1993. It was hosted by the Computers in Education Group of New South Wales. 43 papers were presented at the conference, focusing on "research and scholarship in the use of computers in elementary, secondary and higher education level".

In 2008, the conference was held in Canberra and the Education Minister Julia Gillard delivered the opening Keynote Address, highlighting the importance of digital technologies in her education reform agenda.

In 2012, the conference was held in Perth. The theme of the conference was It's Time. The conference addressed the role of community is teachers'knowledge development and the role of teachers in technological development in education. Teachers were identified as both knowledge providers and facilitators of learning and e-learning process.

In 2014, the conference was held in Adelaide. The theme of the conference was Now It's Personal. Papers presented at the conference focused on the positive and negative impacts of ICT projects on student attitudes and capabilities, students'conceptual understanding of digital devices, and the importance of harmonizing pedagogy with technology.

== Conference locations ==
- 2016: Brisbane, theme: IF
- 2014: Adelaide, theme: Now ITs Personal. Venue: Adelaide Convention Centre
- 2012: Perth, theme: ITs Time. Venue: Wesley College, South Perth.
- 2010: Melbourne, theme: Digital Diversity. Venue: Melbourne Convention and Exhibition Centre
- 2008: Canberra, theme: "ACT on IcT" Venue: National Convention Centre
- 2006: Cairns, theme: IT's up here for Thinking. Venue: Cairns Convention Centre
- 2004: Adelaide
- 2002: Sandy Bay, Tasmania, theme: "Linking Learners"
- 2000: Melbourne, theme: Learning Technologies, Teaching and the Future of Schools. Venue: Carlton Crest Hotel. Website: conference website
- 1998: Adelaide
- 1996: Canberra
- 1995: Perth, theme: Learning without limits.

== Frameworks ==
Australia has six states and two territories. Each of them has a certain degree of independence. Constitutionally, each state has an independent education system and the government has a limited role in coordinating and funding specific computer education projects.

ICT and Learning Technologies(LT) in Australia are referred to the use of technologies in teaching and learning activities. Western Australia uses LT to refer to ICT as tools to improve the quality of teaching and learning. In Victoria, LT is referred to as different forms of ICT to support classroom learning.

Computers have become commonly used in Australian schools since the 1990s. The 1994 Statement on Technology for Australian schools outlined four strands for ICT in education: Designing, Making and Appraising; Information; Material; and Systems. "The statement also included the place of technology in society, the need of students to experience technology education and the form in which it should appear in the school curriculum."

In 1995, each state of Australia implemented its own strategic plan for using technology to support the library system, school administration and classroom learning. Each state also had their own emphasis in the use of technology in education: Queensland focused on databases, Tasmania focused on desktop publishing and Western Australia focused on tutorial packaging.

In 1997, Queensland set up the minimum professional standards for teachers in LT. Teachers were expected to understand the needs of students relative to the use of ICT, select relevant teaching strategies with the use of ICT to cater the needs of students, and create learning experiences where students can use ICT to interpret, analyze and represent knowledge.

In August 1999, all Australian states adopted the national goals to transform students into "confident, creative and productive users of new technologies". In the same year, the federal report,Teacher for the 21st Century, recognized the importance of ICT in the professional development of teachers.

In Western Australia, the 2001 Competency Framework for Teachers outlined the anticipation for teachers to evaluate LT through the application of personal knowledge, encourage students to select appropriate LT to enhance their learning experiences, and provide opportunities for students to use technology for a variety of purposes.

In 2008, the Council of Australian Governments (COAG) released the Melbourne Declaration on Education Goals for Young Australians. The Declaration asked all Australian governments to commit in the pursuit of equal education opportunities and outcomes, relative to the goals of 1999 to transform students into creative and confident users of technology and informed citizens. Education Minister Julia Gillard's 2008 reform agenda highlighted the importance of ICT in education. The agenda aimed to improve the quality of education by recruiting high-performing graduates into teaching and recognizing the high-quality teachers. The vision of the agenda was to create a better education system in Australia.

In 2011, the Digital Education Advisory Group (DEAG) was established. The group consists of experts from the government, education, academia and industry field. Their task was to assess the achievements of computer education, analyze what still remained to be achieved, set up new priorities and implement strategies for future developments of digital education. The assessment required examinations of digitcal education policy outcomes and published data of Australian and global initiatives. The National Digital Economy Strategy (NDES) was a strategic framework for Australia to become a world-leading digital economy by 2020. One of the eight goals was to expand online education such that Australian schools, universities and other higher education institutions will have access to online educational services and resources.

In 2012, the project called "Digital Education Revolution" (DER) has delivered 911,000 laptops and computers to students in Years 9-12 across Australia for educational purposes for all the subjects at school.

== ACCE and other supporting organizations and conferences ==
In Australia, there are not many formal national associations to support computer education. The ACCE is one of the formal national organizations on research, learning and innovation. It is the only national organization that is entirely devoted to computer education. ACCE has affiliates in each state. An example is the New South Wales Computer Education Group and Victoria Computer Education Group. The state affiliates take turns to host the ACEC and publish newsletters. Australian Computer Society (ACS) also gives support to computer education and is linked to the International Federation of Information Processing (IFIP).

There is a cooperation between organizations and sectors to accelerate the development of computer education. An example is the creation of Asia-Pacific Information Technology in Training and Education (APITITE), consists of ACCE, ACS and Technology for Training and Education (ITTE). Decision has been made by APITITE to combine conferences of the major organizations. The first conference of APITITE was held in June and July in 1994. There are several organizations that support the development of computer education of Australian higher education. Two organizations that are primarily focusing on the promotion of computer education are the Australian Society for Educational Technology (ASET) and the Australian Society for Computers in Learning in Tertiary Education (ASCILITE). These two organizations host annual and biennial conferences which have attracted both local and international delegates.

Australasian Computing Education Conference (ACE) was established in 1996 and has provided a forum for academics and experts who are interested in computer education. The conference is primarily for researchers in computer education and educators that are concerned about teaching computing or using computers in their teaching.

== Technology in education ==
Technology in education has two major approaches. One is learning from technology and one is learning with technology. Learning with technology is known as integrated learning system while learning from technology is known as constructivist environments.

Traditional classroom learning is teacher-centred and technology in classroom learning is student-centred. Traditional classroom learning focuses on mass instruction where one size fits all; technology in classroom learning focuses on mass customization to fit individual student and teacher needs. There is insufficient evidence to show that technology in the classroom learning will enable more learning compared to traditional classroom learning and alternative methods.

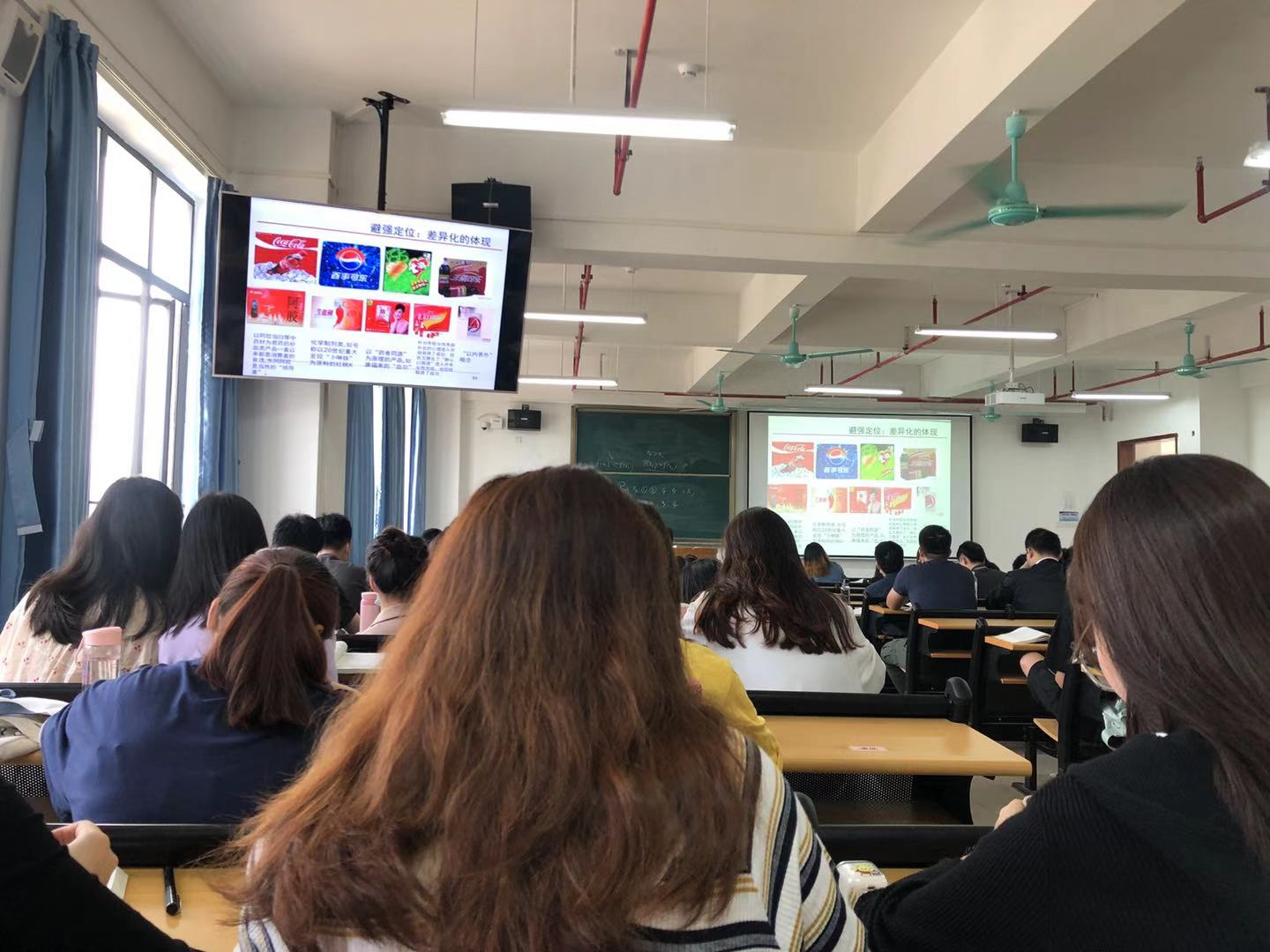
University students in a technology learning classroom

The common forms of technology used in classroom are projectors, desktops, laptops and mobile devices. Artificial Intelligence(AI) is the use of computers to complete the tasks that previously required mankind. AI has already been applied in education in some places and is expected to be applied on a larger scale in the future educational models to fill the gaps in education system. There are three categories of AI software applications in education that are available today: personal tutors, intelligent support for collaborative learning, and intelligent virtual reality.

The development of technology has displayed various advantages of integrating technology in education such as increased equity of access, repeatability and transportability. Previous empirical studies have revealed a total of 123 technology integration barriers in education. There are 6 main categories that hinder technology integration: Resources, knowledge and skills, institutions, attitudes and beliefs, assessment, and subject culture. Of the six main barriers, 40% of the studies have identified resources as the primary barrier.

There are four types of computer education in classrooms.

=== Bring your own device (BYOD) ===
In the BYOD environment, students bring their own digital device for educational purposes. BYOD allows school to reduce costs of supplying digital devices and allows students to use devices in which they are familiar with. By using their own devices security in social or online world is assured by almost 100%.

=== Blended learning ===
Blended learning is "an education environment where teachers use digital technology in traditional or flipped classrooms on a regular basis". It combines face-to-face learning environment with online learning environment. Blended learning is utilized to eliminate the weakness of fully online learning environment such as isolation. There are a number of variables and aspects involved in determining the structure of a blended learning environment. Decisions about structure are made with respect to the goals and capabilities of the instructor, the students and the learning environment.

=== Online learning ===
Online learning refers to distant education. The majority or all of the course content is delivered by the instructor to students online with no or limited face-to-face interaction and teaching.

=== Flipped learning ===
Flipped learning is a pedagogical model in which direct instruction moves from group learning space to individual learning space to allow instructors to focus on student engagement and active learning.

== See also ==
- C2SV
- NexCon
- TechfestNW
- DEMO conference
