= International Federation for Learning, Education, and Training Systems Interoperability =

The International Federation for Learning, Education, and Training Systems Interoperability (LETSI) is an international nonprofit organization focused on enabling technical interoperability for computer-based learning, education, and training systems. Comprising e-learning vendors, adopters, standards bodies, associations, and policy makers, LETSI's primary activity is to support the adoption of open software standards in learning systems. The LETSI community formed around an international planning effort for the next generation of the Sharable Content Object Reference Model (SCORM), which was originally created by the U.S. Advanced Distributed Learning Initiative. LETSI was founded in March 2008 to serve the international SCORM community.

== History ==
In 1997, the U.S. Department of Defense founded the Advanced Distributed Learning (ADL) Initiative, with the mission of improving "access to education, training, and performance aids, tailored to individual needs, delivered cost effectively, anytime and anywhere".

In January 2000, the ADL released the first edition of the Sharable Content Object Reference Model (SCORM), a technical framework designed to facilitate interoperability of computer-based education and training materials. Though developed for use within the DoD, SCORM became widely adopted in commercial, educational, government, and international projects.

Recognizing that SCORM had acquired an international constituency across a broad spectrum of markets, the ADL in 2005 determined that an "international collaborative approach" was required in order to meet the needs of the SCORM user base, and resolved that "an international stewardship organisation shall be established and become fully functional within a three-year period."

In March 2007, representatives from Australia, Brazil, Canada, China, France, Germany, Hungary, Japan, Korea, Mexico, Norway, Singapore, Switzerland, Tunisia, the United Kingdom, and the United States assembled at the London Institute for Education to discuss the formation of LETSI.

In March 2008, the LETSI founding sponsors signed a Memorandum of Understanding in Seoul, Korea about their common goals and principles and approved LETSI’s Operating Procedures Pro Tem.

In August, 2008, LETSI held the first SCORM 2.0 conference, in Pensacola, Florida.

== Governance ==
LETSI adheres to an open development process. The public may view meeting minutes, committee decisions, and materials related to work in progress at no cost through the LETSI wiki. Nonmembers may contribute comments, case studies, and other inputs to LETSI through the wiki. Voting, however, requires membership, which involves an annual fee.

Outputs of LETSI, such as a new SCORM reference model, are planned to be public and non-proprietary.

LETSI currently operates under IEEE Industry Standards and Technology Organization (ISTO) interim procedures. The Sponsors' Executive Committee (SEC), which is composed of sponsors, serves as LETSI’s governing body.

== Working groups ==
LETSI activities are organized into the following working groups, each responsible for a different area of the next SCORM:

- Architecture Working Group
- Business Requirements Working Group
- Orchestration (Sequencing) Working Group
- Teaching and Learning Strategies Working Group

== Software outputs ==
To increase consistency of adoption and to decrease time-to-market for innovation, LETSI plans to develop enabling software components (for example, code for RESTful and SOAP-based web services) and other tools for developers. These tools will be available to developers free of charge.

== See also ==
- Advanced Distributed Learning Initiative (ADL)
- Aviation Industry Computer-Based Training Committee (AICC)
