= Valamis =

Finnish enterprise software company

Valamis Group Ltd.
- Logo since May 17, 2018

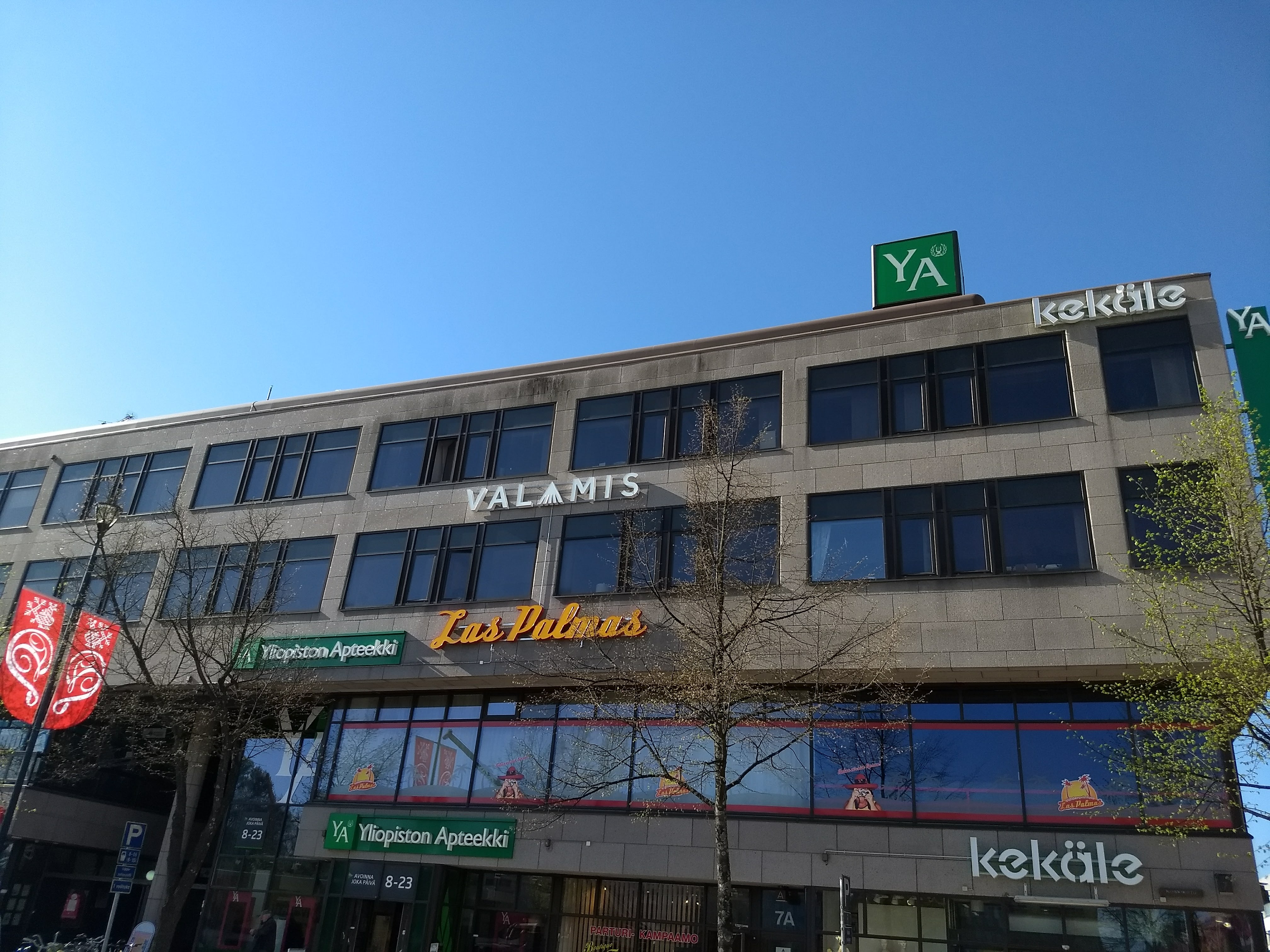
- Valamis's headquarters in Joensuu
- Formerly: Arcusys Ltd. (2003–2018)
- Industry: Enterprise software Educational technology
- Founded: 18 December 2003; 22 years ago
- Founders: Jussi Hurskainen (CEO); Mika Kuikka (President); Kyösti Nevalainen; Mikko Taivainen
- Headquarters: Joensuu, Finland
- Area served: Worldwide
- Products: Valamis - Learning Experience Platform
- Operating income: €9.8 million (2018); US$11.43 million
- Number of employees: 180 (2018)
- Parent: Adelis Equity Partners
- Subsidiaries: Valamis Learning UK Limited; Valamis Inc.; Valamis Deutschland GmbH; Valamis Benelux B.V.
- Website: www.valamis.com

Valamis Group Ltd. is a Finnish enterprise software company headquartered in Joensuu, Finland. The company maintains additional offices in countries such as the United States, United Kingdom, Germany, India, and the Netherlands.

The main product of the company is an online learning platform and learning management system (LMS).

== History ==
Arcusys was founded on 18 December 2003, by Jussi Hurskainen, Mika Kuikka, Kyösti Nevalainen and Mikko Taivainen. In the early years, Valamis' main business was working as a subcontractor for large manufacturing corporations. When the technology development took off within the company in 2007, Valamis started work with universities.

In 2012, Arcusys acquired the software company Fudeco Ltd and expanded its offices to Oulu, Finland.

In 2016, the company acquired the predictive analytics company Olapcon Ltd.

In May 2018, Arcusys changed its name to Valamis as part of strategic efforts to focus on its core digital learning platform.

In January 2019, Valamis acquired the software company Componence Services B.V. and opened an office in Amsterdam.

In December 2020, Valamis was acquired by Adelis Equity Partners. Adelis acquired shares from the passive shareholders and invested growth equity in the company through a private offering.

In July 2021, Valamis acquired the digital learning management software company The Working Manager Limited (TWM).
