= Authoring =

Authoring may refer to:

- Writing, as by an author
- Authoring systems, computer based systems that allow the creation of content for intelligent tutoring systems
- Optical disc authoring and DVD authoring, the process of creating a DVD or a CD from multimedia source materials.
