= ACEC =

ACEC may refer to:

- Advisory Committee on Electromagnetic Compatibility, a branch of the International Electrotechnical Commission
- American Council of Engineering Companies, a representative of America's engineering industry
- Area of Critical Environmental Concern, a program managed by the Bureau of Land Management
  - Area of Critical Environmental Concern (Massachusetts), a state level land protection program in Massachusetts
- Australian Computers in Education Conference, a conference held by the Australian Council for Computers in Education every two years
- SA Ateliers de Constructions Electriques de Charleroi, Belgian electrical engineering company founded in 1904, defunct 1989
