= Freedom of spirit =

Freedom of spirit may refer to:

- Autonomous learning
- Cognitive liberty
- Critical consciousness
- Freedom of religion
- Freedom of thought
- Free will
- Meditation
- Mental prayer
- Spiritual experience
