= Learning management =

Learning Management is the capacity to design pedagogic strategies that achieve learning outcomes for students. The learning management concept was developed by Richard Smith of Central Queensland University (Australia) and is derived from architectural design (an artful arrangement of resources for definite ends) and is best rendered as design with intent. Learning management then means an emphasis on ‘the design and implementation of pedagogical strategies that achieve learning outcomes. That is, in the balance between and emphasis on curriculum development and pedagogy, the emphasis is definitely on pedagogical strategies. Underpinning the learning management premise is a new set of knowledge and skills, collectively referred to as a futures orientation and which attempts to prepare the mindsets and skillsets of teaching graduates for conditions of social change that pervade local and global societies in the 2000s. The practitioner of learning management is referred to as a learning manager. Adjunct to the theory and practice of learning management is the Learning Management Design Process (LMDP). The LMDP is a curriculum planning process comprising 8 'learning design based' questions. The process was developed by Professor David Lynch of Central Queensland University in 1998 and is used primarily as a tool to train teachers to teach [3]. These 'eight questions' when answered in sequence focus the teacher to what is important when planning to teach students. The LMDP organizes its 8 questions through three sequential phases: Outcomes, Strategy, and Evidence. Each phase represents the bodies of information that its associated questions seek to pursue. The LMDP represents a rethink of the various curriculum development models that have predominated the planning of teaching and curriculum in the developed world over past decades. The teacher develops their 'teaching plan' by engaging with each phase and its questions and recording ‘findings’ (or answers) in plan form.

== Definition ==
A learning management system (LMS) is a software application or Web-based technology that ranges from managing training and training records to distributing courses to employees/students over the internet. Typically, LMS' provide an employer/instructor with a way to create and deliver specialized content, monitor employee/student participation, and assess their overall performance and completion of the required courses. A learning management system may also provide employees/students with the ability to use interactive features such as managing courses, online assessment, threaded discussions, video conferencing, and discussion forums to reach their full potential.

This software allows for the employee/student to take learning into their own hands while either staying current in their specific field or branch out and learning new skills.

== What is needed in a Learning Environment ==
Online learning environments are a fairly new and fast-growing industry that is available to many individuals and companies around the world. It is important for the learning environment to offer a secure place where a large number of people can come to receive training and new skills so that they can grow and learn in their fields. Many times it is no longer possible for managers and professors to get an entire group of people together for a course or mandatory training. Companies and institutes are finding it hard to keep track of paperwork proving training completion, forms, and evaluations. With LMS these problems are solved with everything now digital and available with just a few strokes on a keyboard. Some of the return that companies get back from investments in LMS’ are the ability to quickly train and track the learning of employees, and the ability to better train employees, avoid fines by being able to quickly showing compliance as well as giving employees room to grow and learn with a full scale of training. Because LMS is such an industry, the market is continuously growing and improving its services. Many of these companies encourage informational feedback from clients on what is working for them and what is not.

== Learning Management Industry ==
In the relatively new LMS market, commercial vendors for corporate and education applications range from new entrants to those that entered the market in the nineties. In addition to commercial packages, many open-source software solutions are available.

In 2005, LMSs represented a fragmented $500 million market (CLO magazine). The six largest LMS product companies constitute approximately 43% of the market. In addition to the remaining smaller LMS product vendors, training outsourcing firms, enterprise resource planning vendors, and consulting firms all compete for part of the learning management market.

LMS buyers are less satisfied than a year ago. According 2005 and 2006 surveys by the American Society for Training and Development (ASTD), respondents that were very unsatisfied with an LMS purchase doubled and those that were very satisfied decreased by 25%. The number that was very satisfied or satisfied edged over 50%. (About 30% were somewhat satisfied.) Nearly one quarter of respondents intended to purchase a new LMS or outsource their LMS functionality over the next 12 months.

In a 2009 survey, a growing number of organizations reporting deploying an LMS as part of larger Enterprise Resource Planning (ERP) systems.

Channel learning is underserved. For many buyers, channel learning is not their number one priority, according to a survey by Training Outsourcing. Often there is a disconnect when the Human Resources department oversees training and development initiatives, where the focus is consolidating LMS systems inside traditional corporate boundaries. Software technology companies are at the front end of this curve, placing a higher priority on channel training.
