= 8 learning management questions =

Set of questions for teachers

The 8 Learning Management Questions (or 8 LMQs) is a set of questions developed in and primarily utilized in Australia for teacher training and curriculum development. This sequential design-based set of questions is designed to assist teachers in developing a teaching plan for their classrooms, with a focus on achieving the intended learning outcomes for all students. The process is mainly focused on enabling teachers to translate teaching theory into practice.

David E. Lynch developed the questions in 1998. The 8 questions, which are divided into three design phases, are answered in a sequential numerical order. The 8 Learning Management Questions form the foundation of teacher training at Central Queensland University and Charles Darwin University in Australia, and are also used to inform teaching practices in the Northern Territory.

The 8 LMQs serve two important purposes. Firstly, they act as a "professional knowledge organizer". This means that the 8 LMQs enable teachers to identify and organize the fundamental elements required for the successful development and execution of learning experiences, units of work, or individual lessons. For student-teachers, the 8 LMQs also act as a "knowledge organizer" where essential professional knowledge learned as part of their preparation program is organized, providing them with a bank of considerations that they can utilize while engaging with each question. In other words, the teacher education program should be structured in a way that informs each LMQ. The 8 LMQs have two key purposes. Firstly, they act as a "professional knowledge organiser." This means the 8 LMQs enable the teacher to identify and organise the fundamental considerations required for the successful development and execution of learning experiences, units of work, or individual lessons. For the student-teacher, the 8 LMQs act as a "knowledge organiser" whereby essential professional knowledge learned as part of their preparation program is organised so that they have a bank of considerations they can draw upon as they engage with each question. This means the teacher education program should be presented in a way that informs each LMQ.

This provides the student-teacher with a ready-reference arrangement of knowledge that they can draw upon and unpack when designing and executing successful learning experiences. The second purpose of the 8 LMQs is to transition teaching from teacher-centred activities to more responsive student-centred learning approaches. The 8 LMQs are therefore a deliberate strategy to draw the teacher to the nuances of each student and away from one-size-fits-all approaches that are characteristic of teaching, curriculum planning, and lesson planning.

OUTCOMES PHASE LMQ1: What have my students achieved to date?

LMQ2: What do i do to help my students achieve the objectives of the lesson better and faster?

STRATEGY PHASE LMQ3: How do my students best learn?

LMQ4: What resources do i have at my disposal?

LMQ5: What are my teaching strategies?

LMQ6: Who will participate in which aspect to support the teaching strategy?

EVIDENCE PHASE LMQ7: How will i check that students have achieved the defined learning outcomes?

LMQ8: How will i report student progress?

The 8 LMQs are based on the Dimensions of Learning (DoL) pedagogic framework, which provides evidence-based teaching strategies for developing and delivering specific learning experiences or lessons. These teaching strategies are step-by-step approaches that have been confirmed by research to underpin successful learning experiences.

The term learning management is used deliberately because the questions were developed as a subset of the learning management teaching knowledge base.
