= Information Learning Technology =

Information and Learning Technology (or ILT) is a term mainly used in the British further education sector. It describes the methods of using technology to enhance the learning experience within education.

== Possible applications of Information and Learning Technology ==
- Use of sound within an otherwise static presentation: There may be an image in a PowerPoint presentation, which could be clicked upon in different areas to provide audio commentary.
- Use of digital video or digital images for learning activities.
- Use of a VLE to run courses and activities within and outside an educational establishment.
- Interactive quizzes/activities - either online or within a classroom using an electronic voting system made up of infra-red handsets and a receiver.
- Use of podcasts or downloadable MP3s for classroom notes, revision or whole lectures.
- Use of collaborative documents within a group environment.
- Use of planification, budget-tracking and resource management software such as a training management system to streamline back-office training processes.
