= Autonomous learning =

Autonomous learning may refer to:

- Autonomous learning in homeschooling
- Learner autonomy
- Machine learning
- Self-paced instruction
