= Instructor-led training =

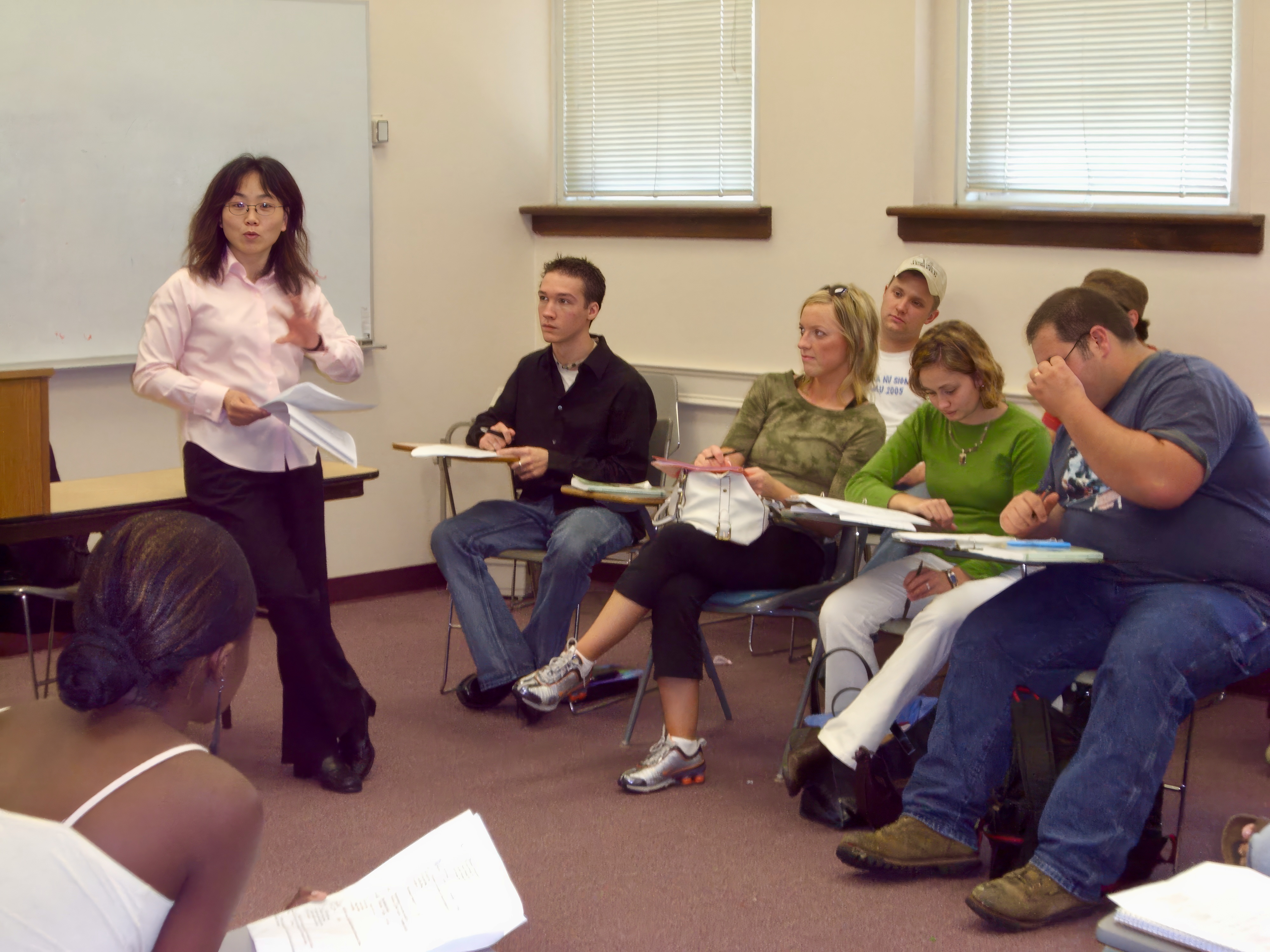
Professor and students in a university classroom in Tennessee

Instructor-led training, or ILT, is the practice of training and learning material between an instructor and learners, either individuals or groups. Instructors can also be referred to as a facilitator, who may be knowledgeable and experienced in the learning material, but can also be used more for their facilitation skills and ability to deliver material to learners.

Instructors may deliver training in a lecture or classroom format, as an interactive workshop, as a demonstration with the opportunity for learners to practice, or even virtually, using video-conferencing tools; and the instructor may have facilitation and teaching skills, in which they can use different methods to engage learners and embrace different learning styles.

Other learning delivery methods include e-learning which delivers self-paced courses online, and blended learning which mixes instructor-led and e-learning elements.

== Use and effectiveness ==
Instructor-led training represents overall 66% of corporate training and development; it reaches 76% in high-performing companies and 80% in high-consequence industries (healthcare industry, pharmaceutical industry, finance, utilities, etc.). It is also the most widely-used method for extended enterprise training, which trains customers and partners, with an 80% usage rate. In the UK, one in three companies who use e-learning currently deliver more than three-quarters of their training and development activities completely through face-to-face experiences.

The primary reason why human resources departments prefer instructor-led training is its high effectiveness in terms of knowledge retention: in a survey rating every training and development delivery format, in-person instructor-led classrooms are in third position, with 3.63 out of 5, whereas e-learning modules are in seventh position, with a grade of 3.05 out of 5.

ILT is an effective means of delivering information, as it allows for real-time feedback, questions and answers, manipulation and changeable delivery to suit the needs of learners in a real-time environment, and a learning environment can be created by the instructor's style.

== Managing instructor-led training ==
Although instructor-led training dominates the market in terms of use because of its effectiveness, it tends to be a costlier learning delivery method. Hiring an instructor, renting or maintaining facilities, providing hands-on tools, travel, food, and boarding can push companies on a tight budget. Additionally, classroom occupancy rates and resource use are not always maximized.

This is why streamlining logistics, scheduling and administration, managing resources, and optimizing the budget are key in managing instructor-led training. Organizations such as corporate training departments, corporate university as well as training companies generally manage this through a core enterprise resource planning (ERP) such as a training management system.

The training management system optimizes ILT management by streamlining every aspect of the training process: planning (training plan and budget forecasting), logistics (scheduling and resource management), financials (cost tracking, profitability), reporting, and sales for for-profit training providers. For example, a training management system can be used to schedule instructors, venues and equipment through graphical agendas, optimize resource use, create a training plan and track remaining budgets, generate reports and share data between different teams.

While training management systems focus on managing instructor-led training, they can complete an LMS. In this situation, an LMS will manage e-learning delivery and assessment, while a training management system will manage ILT and back-office budget planning, logistic and reporting.

== Recent trends ==
Recently, there have been many trends in modernizing and optimizing instructor-led training through educational technology.

Instructor-led training can be delivered within a classroom or remotely through a virtual classroom, in which case it is called virtual instructor-led training. Instructor and learners are in different locations, and a classroom environment is replicated through online tools. This type of training can be delivered synchronously or asynchronously.

Instructor-led training can also be combined with e-learning in a blended learning scenario to achieve a maximum effectiveness. In this case, some of the training is delivered live while online courses serve as refreshers between sessions. A growing type of blended learning is called the flipped classroom model, where students acquire information by watching lectures online and then engage in problem-solving, discussion and group activities in class.

Training within the classroom can be also enhanced through a range of technology and collaborative tools such as video software and system to access content during the class.

Lastly, instructor-led training back office management can be optimized through dedicated software which streamline all processes (scheduling, logistics, costs and budget management, administration, reporting, etc.) such as a training management system. This allows training organizations to improve the efficiency of their ILT and optimize their training budget.
