= Funding opportunity announcement =

A funding opportunity announcement (FOA) is a notice in Grants.gov of a U.S. federal grant funding opportunity.

Funding opportunity announcements can be found at Grants.gov/FIND and this website lets organizations apply for grants for over 1,000 grant programs from 26 federal agencies.

Each FOA includes instructions – a Grant Application Guide, and forms – a Grant Application Package.

== Overview ==
FOA is a publicly available document by which a U.S. Federal agency makes known its intentions to award discretionary grants or cooperative agreements, usually as a result of competition for funds. Funding opportunity announcements may be known as program announcements, requests for applications, notices of funding availability, solicitations, or other names depending on the agency and type of program.

== Program announcement (PA) ==
Program announcement (PA) identifies areas of increased priority and/or emphasis on particular funding mechanisms for a specific area of science.

== Request for application (RFA) ==
Request for application (RFA) identifies a more narrowly defined area for which one or more agencies have set aside funds for awarding grants.

== Request for proposal (RFP) ==
Request for proposal (RFP) solicits contract proposals. An RFP usually has one receipt date, as specified in RFP solicitation

== Notice (NOT) ==
Notice (NOT) Announces policy and procedures, changes to RFA or PA announcements, RFPs and other general information items.

== NIH ==
NIH and other HHS Agencies have developed omnibus Parent Announcements for common grant mechanisms that have transitioned to electronic submission, for use by applicants who wish to submit what were formerly termed “unsolicited” or "investigator-initiated" applications.

== Funding opportunity number ==
Funding opportunity numbers (FON) is a number that a federal agency assigns to its grant announcement.

FON are currently unique within the Grants.Gov System. (An enhancement was recently completed which NO longer allows duplicate funding opportunity numbers within the system .)

It must not have special characters other than a “–“ (dash) in the number.

== See also ==
- Broad Agency Announcement
