= Nile (company) =

Multinational technology company

- Company type: Private
- Industry: IT Networking
- Founded: 2018; 8 years ago
- Founder: Pankaj Patel; Suresh Katukam; John Chambers; Sri Hosakote
- Headquarters: San Jose, California, United States
- Area served: North America, Asia, Europe, and Middle East
- Key people: Pankaj Patel (CEO); Bill Choi (CFO); Suresh Katukam (CPO); Sri Hosakote (CDO); Shashi Kiran (CMO); Frank Wiacek (CRO)
- Products: Campus Network-as-a-Service, Trust Service, Guest Service, and DHCP as a Service
- Website: www.nilesecure.com

Nile is a multinational technology company that delivers network and security infrastructure services for enterprises and government organizations. The company is based in San Jose, California, and operates primarily in North America, with a presence in twenty-five countries across Asia, Europe, and the Middle East.

== History ==
Nile was established in 2018 by former Cisco Systems executives John Chambers and Pankaj Patel, Suresh Katukam, and Sri Hosakote. The company introduced its primary offering, the Nile Access Service, in September 2022.

In August 2023, the company secured $175 million in Series C funding co-led by March Capital and Sanabil Investments to support expansion.

In March 2024, Nile launched several new AI-powered automation services to its Nile Access Service. The company received CRN Tech Innovators Award in 2024 and was recognized in the Gartner Peer Insights Voice of the Customer Report as a strong performer in enterprise wired and wireless LAN services.

== Operations ==
Nile specializes in a Campus Network-as-a-Service (NaaS) model, offering both wired and wireless Local Area Network (LAN) connectivity with integrated Zero Trust Networking (ZTN), automated lifecycle management, and the industry's first performance guarantee. Nile's Campus Network-as-a-Service leverages continuous monitoring, analytics, and automation to enhance reliability and reduce manual network management requirements. The company's services primarily target enterprises in North America but also operates across Asia, Europe, and the Middle East. Major customers include Stanford University, Pitney Bowes, Carta, and more.

Nile maintains two main offices in San Jose, California, and Bengaluru, India, with approximately 200 employees. The company operates as a private, venture-funded entity.

== Overview ==
The Nile Access Service is built on a vertically integrated hardware, software, and cloud-based management platform that combines high-performance wired and wireless network infrastructure with integrated Campus Zero Trust security and AI-powered automation capabilities. The service is designed to simplify deployment, automate maintenance, and provide continuous optimization through built-in monitoring and closed-loop automation.
