= Word Wheel =

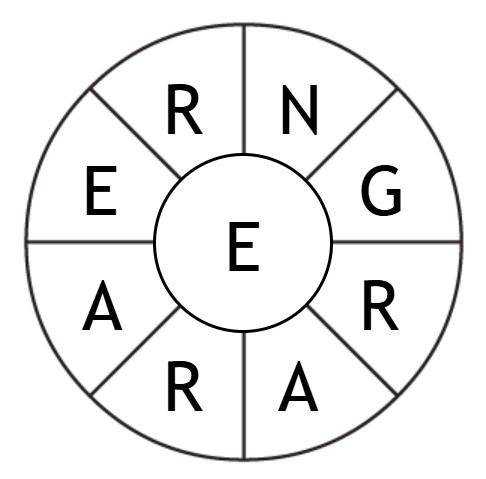
Word Wheel with 'rearrange'

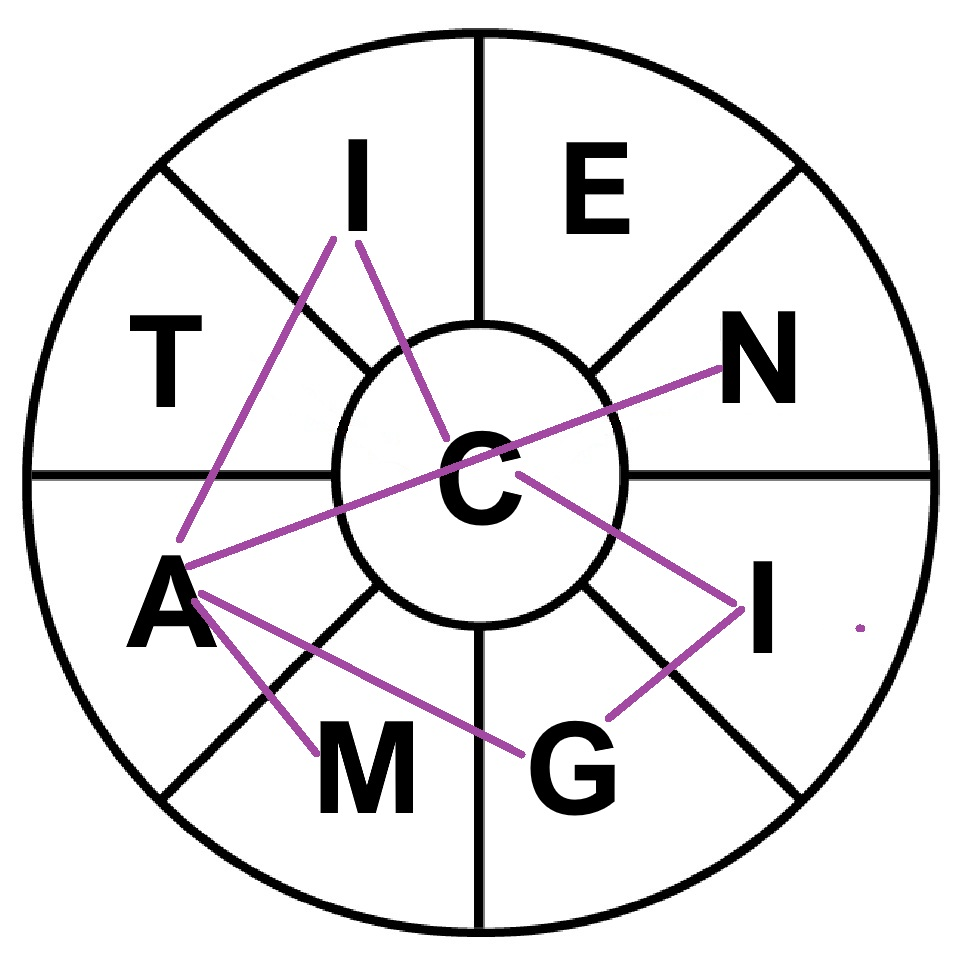
In 'magician' the 'A' is used twice

Word Wheel is a wordpuzzle in which words are formed from a circular arrangement of letters, usually with a mandatory central letter. Additionally, the wheel often contains a nine-letter anagram in which all available letters are used exactly once. The puzzle is a regular feature on the puzzle pages in various international newspapers, such as the Daily Express and The Guardian. The Times publishes the puzzle under the name "Polygon".

== Description ==
A standard word wheel consists of nine letters, one of which is placed in the center (the hub) and the remaining eight in a circle around it. The words to be formed must usually consist of at least three or four letters and often contain a nine-letter anagram in which all available letters are used exactly once.

Although variants with more or fewer letters exist, the objective remains the same: to find as many valid words as possible that meet the rules. There is no single correct solution; the number of possible answers depends on the solver’s vocabulary.

The game shares similarities with Scrabble and various anagram puzzles.

== Game rules ==
Typical game rules stipulate that only dictionary words are allowed. Proper nouns, abbreviations, and archaic words are generally excluded. Letters may only be used multiple times if they actually appear multiple times in the wheel.

The goal of the puzzle can vary: sometimes the aim is to achieve a minimum score, while in other cases it revolves around finding the longest word or discovering the nine-letter anagram. Word Wheels are used for language training, memory exercises, and as a form of entertainment.

== Digital variants ==
Besides the paper version, there are various digital versions of the Word Wheel that are popular on mobile devices, websites, and puzzle apps. In these versions, players are often supported with features such as hints, automatic word checking, scoring, and leaderboards. Some platforms reward finding the so-called puzzle word, the anagram that uses all the letters.

The rules of the game may vary by website or app. On certain platforms, letters may not be repeated, while other variants do allow repetition or doubling of letters. Digital word wheels are available in puzzle apps, educational websites, and digital newspapers. Some apps use international leaderboards where players can compare their results.

== History ==
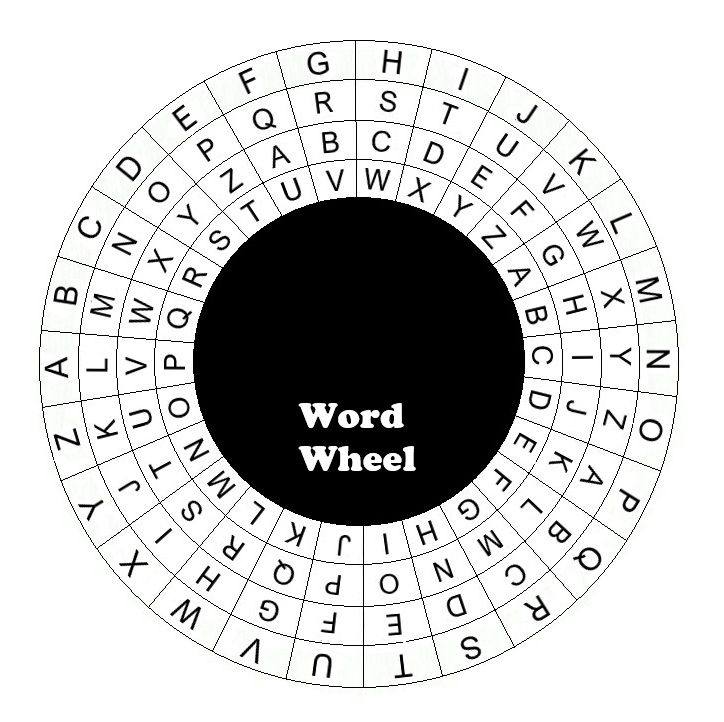
Letter Wheel is a precursor to the Word Wheel

The spinning word wheels ('letter wheels') of American William H. Rieff of Philadelphia, Pennsylvania, are considered an early precursor to the modern Word Wheel puzzle. Rieff obtained a patent for his design in 1882 and subsequently introduced it as a game and practice material for spelling. It consisted of spinning cardboard discs that allowed children to form words in a playful way and thus practice their spelling skills.

Each wheel contained the letters of the alphabet, from A through Z, in fixed order. By spinning the discs, players had to reveal at least two four-letter words simultaneously. For example, when the word PEAR was formed, the word LAWN appeared elsewhere on the dial. Although the task seems simple, there are 17,576 possible unique positions of the wheels, which together yield more than 456,000 combinations of four letters. The modern word wheel puzzle did not appear in newspapers until the twentieth century. In education, physical, rotating word wheels are still used to support young children in recognizing sounds and practicing spelling. In this context, the outer ring often contains consonant combinations, while the inner ring displays vowel patterns. The precise origin of the Word Wheel puzzle is not fully documented. The puzzle type presumably originated in the late 20th century as a variation on existing word puzzles, including anagrams and Scrabble. From the 1990s and 2000s, Word Wheels appeared increasingly frequently in British and American newspapers, such as The Guardian, The Times, and The Washington Post. Their popularity increased further due to the rise of digital puzzle platforms and mobile applications.

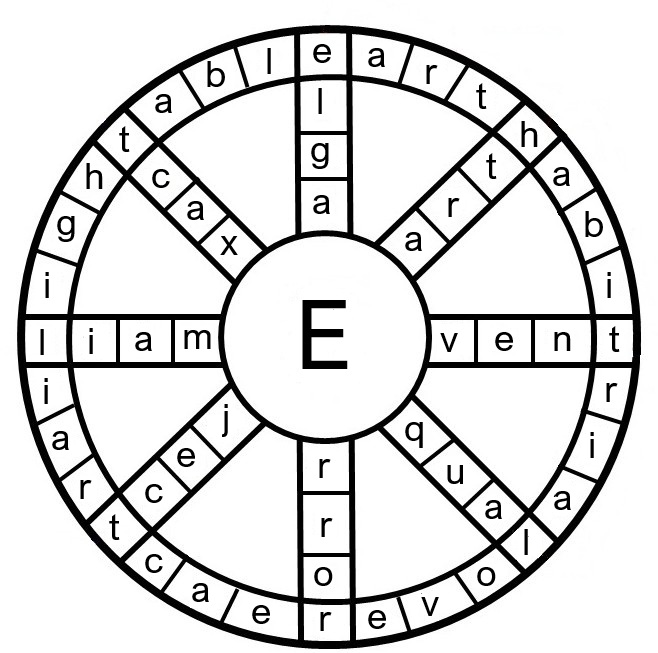
Wagon Word Wheel

The concept shows clear similarities to the game 'Spelling Bee' by The New York Times, which was introduced in 2014. However, this game uses stricter rules and a more extensive scoring system.

== Wagon Word wheel ==
The name Word Wheel also suits the puzzle type Wagon Word Wheel or Letter Wheel. In a Wagon Word Wheel, the eight 'spoke words' must begin with the pre-filled starting letter. Each 5-letter word to be filled in must begin with the letter in the center of the wheel (the axle). The words located on the outer edge of the wheel begin and end with the letters placed at the ends of the spokes. These rim words also consist of five letters and are read clockwise around the wheel.
