= Experience API =

E-learning software specification

The Experience API (xAPI) is an e-learning software specification that records and tracks various types of learning experiences for learning systems. Learning experiences are recorded in a Learning Record Store (LRS), which can exist within traditional learning management systems (LMSs) or on their own.

== Summary ==
The Experience API (Tin Can API) is meant to succeed SCORM, the Sharable Content Object Reference Model, which is a standard for packaging e-learning content. The new Experience API allows trainers to deploy several new capabilities that were not supported with SCORM at the time, such as:

- Recording learning from non-browser activities, such as games and simulations.
- Platform transition; e.g. start e-learning on a mobile device, finish it on a computer
- Team-based e-learning
- Tracking learning plans and goals

The Experience API spec is open source. xAPI uses a Restful web service with JavaScript Object Notation (JSON) for its data format. The web service allows software clients to read and write experiential data in the form of “statement” objects. In their simplest form, statements are in the form of “I did this”, or more generally “actor verb object”. More complex statement forms can be used. There is also a built-in query API to help filter recorded statements, and a state API that allows for a sort of “scratch space” for consuming applications.

== History ==
In 2008, it was determined that the interoperability standards were too limited for SCORM. LETSI appears to request community ideas, as a result of this SCORM 2.0 comes out.

In 2011 Advanced Distributed Learning (ADL), the United States Department of Defense-sponsored stewards of SCORM, recognized the need for a newer and more capable software specification than the original SCORM specification, which was then more than ten years old. To address the need, ADL issued a Broad Agency Announcement (BAA) asking for assistance in improving SCORM, and the BAA was awarded to Rustici Software, a Nashville-based software company experienced with SCORM.

Rustici Software conducted interviews with the e-learning community to determine where to make improvements, and then developed the research version of the Experience API specification. This process was called Project Tin Can. The moniker "Tin Can API" was derived from Project Tin Can, and is still used interchangeably with the name "Experience API".

The Experience API was developed by a community working group and released as version 1.0 in April 2013. There are currently over 160 adopters (19 January 2016).

== Current status ==
The current version of the specification is “IEEE 9274.1.1-2023” – also referred to as xAPI 2.0 - released 10 October 2023 by the IEEE.

Previous versions include: 1.0.3, 1.0.2., 1.0.1., 1.0.0. version 0.8 (official output of the BAA) and version 0.9 (research version specification) 0.95 (second research version specification).

== Implementations ==
Client Libraries
Name	Language	Licence
xAPI-Java	Java	Apache-2.0 license
xAPI.js	JavaScript	MIT license
TinCanPHP	PHP	Apache-2.0 license
