= AI sovereignty =

AI sovereignty is a country's or organization's capacity to control their artificial intelligence (AI) technology. This may cover foundational model algorithms, training data, compute infrastructure, applications, governance policies, and talent pipelines.

As both public and private organizations adopt AI technology, the transition has raised issues around compliance, safety, and control beyond traditional technology sovereignty and data sovereignty. Countries are also developing native AI capabilities to address national security concerns and protect technological sovereignty in the public sector.

In many regulatory frameworks, in addition to data storage, model performance and decision-making reasoning are also subject to scrutiny. Therefore, building control into the architecture has become essential. Beyond traditional IT infrastructure, the scope includes training AI models, such as foundation models and large language models (LLMs), which requires continuous training and updates, as well as inference which happens in real time across complex IT environments.

While there is no universal definition for the term, it could be described in three layers:

1. Physical layer (infrastructure, devices)
2. Code layer (standards, rules, design)
3. Information layer (content, data)

In a public-sector context, the term can mean a government's desire for more agency over domestic AI capabilities. A "hard" version could mean complete self-sufficiency over the entire technology, while a "soft" version could mean a government retaining control and regulatory power over foreign AI solutions vendors.

For private-sector organizations, AI sovereignty usually means operational control. They may choose to deploy AI solutions with on-premise hardware over public cloud facilities, eschewing dependencies on a single vendor, and retaining governance over data and models.
