= Pedagogy 3.0 =

Approach to teaching and learning

Pedagogy 3.0 is a neologism, developed in 2010 by Jim Vanides for the Hewlett Packard Catalyst Initiative. It refers to the attitudes, competencies and skills required by teachers and educators working in a Web 3.0 enabled world.

Web 3.0 is considered to extend the social aspects of Web 2.0, through its use of internet-enabled mobile devices, cloud computing, social networking, and cloud-based collaborative working tools (e.g. Google Apps), which facilitate real-time and asynchronous collaborations. Web 3.0 will extend the Web 1.0 capabilities of information searching through personalisation of information delivery through its use of semantic web algorithms, and search engines.
Pedagogy 3.0 is also the name of a consortium in the HP Catalyst Initiative that is dedicated to exploring the characteristic features of a pedagogy that makes full use of this technology. The group is primarily focussing on developing models of pedagogy for STEM+ subjects, (Science-Technology-Engineering-Mathematics and other subjects based on empirical evidence, including anthropology, geography, psychology, and sociology).

The HP Catalyst Pedagogy 3.0 consortium considers that pedagogy 3.0 facilitates collaborative, open-ended involvement between students, with the teacher adopting the roles of facilitator and mentor. Open-ended activities may run alongside other, more teacher-directed, activities in a versatile pedagogy that is an extension of blended learning pedagogic models. Learning in such scenarios is constructivist and has similarities with project-based, inquiry and problem-based approaches, although extended to exploit the collaborative features emerging in Web 3.0 tools.
