= Docebo =

Canadian software company

Docebo Inc.
- Type: Public
- Traded as: TSX: DCBO; Nasdaq: DCBO
- Industry: Information Technology
- Founded: 2005; 21 years ago
- Headquarters: Toronto, Ontario, Canada
- Key people: Alessio Artuffo (CEO)
- Services: Learning management system
- Website: docebo.com

Docebo Inc. is an educational technology company founded in 2005. Its flagship product is Docebo Learn, an AI learning management system. Its shares are traded on both the Toronto Stock Exchange (TSX: DCBO) and the Nasdaq Global Select Market (Nasdaq: DCBO). The company's corporate headquarters are located in Toronto, Ontario.

== History ==
=== Founding and early development (2005–2012) ===
Docebo was founded in 2005 by Claudio Erba and in its formative years, Docebo primarily operated within Italy. The company secured its first round of funding in 2012: €2.4 million from Principia SGR, an Italian venture capital firm, marking an early milestone in its financial growth.

=== North American expansion and internationalization (2012–2016) ===
Following its initial success, Docebo embarked on an internationalization strategy. In 2013, the company established its first U.S. office in Athens, Georgia. Docebo received its second venture-backed financing round in 2015: $3 million from Klass Capital, a Canadian firm. This investment supported the company's continued growth in the region and led to the establishment of its corporate headquarters in Toronto, Ontario, Canada.

Docebo now operates in the global market with offices in Athens, GA; Toronto; London; Paris; Berlin; Biassono; Melbourne; and Dubai.

=== Public listings (2019–2020) ===
Docebo transitioned to a public company with its initial public offering (IPO) on the Toronto Stock Exchange (TSX) on October 8, 2019. This Canadian IPO raised gross proceeds of C$75 million. Building on this public market presence, Docebo expanded its reach by commencing trading in the United States on the Nasdaq Global Select Market under the ticker symbol "DCBO" on December 7, 2020. This U.S. IPO generated gross proceeds of $144 million.

=== CEO succession (2023–2024) ===
In November 2023, Docebo revealed a CEO succession plan. Claudio Erba, the company's founder, transitioned from his role as Chief Executive Officer and a member of the board of directors to become the Chief Innovation Officer, effective February 29, 2024.

Alessio Artuffo, who had been with Docebo for over a decade and held various leadership positions, including Director of International Business Operations, Chief Revenue Officer, and President & Chief Operating Officer, was appointed Interim Chief Executive Officer effective March 1, 2024.^{9} He assumed the permanent role of CEO in September 2024.

In 2025, Docebo publicly declared an "AI-first roadmap strategy" and achieved FedRAMP Moderate Authorization.

=== AI strategy and expansion into skills (2025-present) ===
In April 2025, Docebo launched an AI-first product roadmap. In January 2026, Docebo acquired 365Talents, a French AI Skills Intelligence platform. This acquisition was described as an effort to "strengthen Docebo’s ability to help organizations identify, develop, and deploy skills at scale by embedding skills intelligence more directly into learning workflows."

== Products and services ==
Docebo offers a cloud-based AI-powered learning platform designed to manage and deliver personalized learning experiences across various audiences and industries.^{2}

=== Core Capabilities ===
The Docebo platform provides tools for content creation, workflow automation, performance measurement, and training for a wide range of audiences. Key features include:

- Content management and personalization. Docebo's platform can automate administrative tasks like tagging, notifications, and enrolments; personalize learning journeys for individual users; and connect disparate workflows to streamline learning processes. The platform also allows central management of learning assets with permissions and user management options.
- Custom portals: The platform enables users to create audience-specific pages for different groups of learners. It offers a suite of free and paid extensions, including certifications, automation, custom domains, audit trails, gamification, and allows organizations to configure the learning management system (LMS) for their specific use cases.^{2}
- Content creation: Docebo has native tools for creating, managing, translating, and delivering learning materials, including courses, assessments, and AI video. This includes features for authoring and pre-designed templates to build learning content efficiently.^{2} The platform also offers AI Virtual Coaching, allowing learners to engage in realistic, scenario-based simulations and receive instant feedback on key performance metrics.
- Data-driven insights: The platform offers detailed analytics and data visualizations, allowing users to track performance metrics, identify learning trends, and demonstrate the impact and return on investment (ROI) of their learning programs.^{2}
- Community-based learning: Docebo incorporates features that foster collaboration and knowledge-sharing among learners. This includes tools for Q&A, personalized discussions, and real-time messaging, transforming the platform into a dynamic learning community.^{2}

=== Use cases and target audiences ===
Docebo's customer base is primarily composed of mid-market and enterprise organizations and government agencies. The platform can be used to meet a wide range of learning objectives and serves diverse audiences, including:

- Employee Onboarding, aimed at improving engagement and productivity.
- Talent Development, focused on skill enhancement and unlocking employee value.
- Compliance Training, designed to meet regulatory standards and mitigate risk.
- Sales Enablement, to equip sales teams with necessary knowledge and skills.
- Customer Education, to educate customers and enhance product adoption.
- Partner Training, enabling partners to become brand champions.
- Frontline Workforce training, improving retention and productivity.
- Member Training, growing memberships and engaging members.

=== Integrations ecosystem ===
The Docebo platform integrates with numerous HR/HCM platforms (e.g., Workday, SAP SuccessFactors), CRM systems (e.g., Salesforce, Hubspot), e-commerce solutions (e.g., Shopify, PayPal), communication tools (e.g., Microsoft Teams, Slack, Zoom), and analytics platforms (e.g., Google Analytics, PowerBI, Snowflake).

== Financials and market position ==
Docebo has demonstrated consistent growth in its customer base and financial performance. As of Q3, 2025, the company reported Annual Recurring Revenue (ARR) of $235.6 million. At that time, Docebo served 3,978 customers.

== Acquisitions ==
Docebo has strategically acquired companies to expand its product capabilities and market reach.

Date	Acquired Company	Sector/Description	Purpose/Contribution
November 9, 2020	Formetris	Learning evaluation platform	Contributes to reporting and measurement capabilities
January 24, 2022	Skillslive	Learning Technology	Contributes to overall learning platform capabilities
April 4, 2023	PeerBoard	Community-as-a-service platform	Expanded external training offerings and enhanced social learning capabilities, crucial for customer, partner, member, and franchise education environments
June 12, 2023	Edugo.AI	Generative AI-based Learning Technology	Enhanced existing AI capabilities and added new generative AI features to the Docebo platform, leveraging advanced Large Language Models (LLM) and algorithms
January 20, 2026	365Talents	AI Skills Intelligence	Integrates skills mapping and workforce analytics into learning workflows to support workforce readiness.
April 21, 2026	Zive	AI knowledge platform	Provides AI knowledge infrastructure enabling new enterprise learning components (AgentHub, Enterprise Knowledge), improving integration of knowledge access and AI-driven workflows across distributed work environments.

== Operations and global presence ==
Docebo maintains its headquarters in Toronto, Ontario, Canada. The company has a significant global footprint with offices in several key international cities. These include Athens (United States), Melbourne (Australia), Paris (France), Berlin (Germany), Biassono (Italy), Dubai (United Arab Emirates), and London (United Kingdom). Beyond its physical office locations, Docebo serves customers in over 90 countries.
