= Executive Order 13111 =

1998 United States executive order

United States Presidential Executive Order 13111 (E.O. 13111), issued by the administration of President Bill Clinton in 1998, created a task force on learning technology.

Section 5 of E.O. 13111 established an Advisory Committee on Expanding Training Opportunities. The Advisory Committee, also referred to as the Advisory Committee on Federal Training Technology, provided the president with an independent assessment of how the federal government could encourage the effective use of learning technology to provide more accessible training for all Americans. It studied the progress made by the federal government in its use of technology in training programs. The committee also provided an analysis of options for helping adult Americans finance the training and post-secondary education needed to upgrade skills. The Office of Personnel Management supported the committee's activities.
