= Integrated learning systems =

Integrated learning systems are hardware/software solutions designed to deliver instructional content. The effective delivery of that content is measured, monitored, and maintained with an array of assessment and management tools that may also be part of that system.

Integrated learning systems are generally associated with educational/academic environments, but are also deployed within private industry, for example, as a way to introduce employees to new, mission critical systems and software applications.

As opposed to static online help or even animated tutorials, integrated learning systems are highly interactive and are designed to provide feedback as to progress and grasp of the subject matter at hand. Built-in tools further allow executive management or instructors and trainers to monitor and measure a student's progress.

== General characteristics ==
- Instructional objectives are specified with individual lessons tied to the objectives.
- Lessons are integrated into the standard curriculum.
- Courseware spans several grade levels in comprehensive fashion.
- Courseware is delivered on a networked system of microcomputers or terminals.
- Management systems collect and record results of student performance.
