= Advanced Distributed Learning =

US government R&D program

The Advanced Digital Learning (ADL) Initiative was a US government program that conducts research and development on distributed learning and coordinates related efforts broadly across public and private organizations. ADL reports to the Defense Human Resources Activity (DHRA), under the director of DHRA. Although it is a DoD program, ADL serves the entire US federal government, operates a global partnership network including international defense ministries and US-based academic partners, and collaborates closely with industry and academia. ADL advises the DoD and US government on emerging learning technologies, best practices for improving learning effectiveness and efficiency, and methods for enhancing interoperability. Notable ADL contributions to distributed learning include the Sharable Content Object Reference Model (SCORM), Experience API (xAPI), and the DoD Instruction 1322.26.

== History ==
The ADL Initiative traces its antecedents to the early 1990s, when Congress authorized and appropriated funds for the National Guard to build prototype electronic classrooms and learning networks to increase personnel's access to learning opportunities. By the mid-1990s, DoD realized the need for a more coordinated approach, and the 1996 Quadrennial Defense Review formalized this by directing development of a department-wide strategy for modernizing technology-based education and training. This strategy became the original ADL Initiative, and in 1998, the Deputy Secretary of Defense directed the Under Secretary of Defense for Personnel and Readiness (USD(P&R), in collaboration with the Services, Joint Staff, Under Secretaries of Defense for Acquisition and Technology and the Comptroller), to lead ADL. The Deputy Secretary of Defense also directed the USD(P&R) to produce the department-wide policy for advanced digital learning, develop a corresponding “master plan” to carry out the policy, and to ensure sufficient programs and resources were available for the associated implementation (see the 1999 ADL Strategic Plan in Appendix 1 for more details).

By 1998, the DoD and other Federal agencies (e.g., the Department of Labor) had each established their own ADL projects, and the Office of Science and Technology Policy (OSTP) moved to consolidate these via the Federal Training Technology Initiative. Thus, following guidance from Congress, OSTP, and the National Partnership for Reinventing Government, the DoD ADL Initiative was grown into a Federal-wide program. Specific direction for this can be found in Section 378 of Public Law 105-261, the Strom Thurmond National Defense Authorization Act for Fiscal Year 1999, which required the Secretary of Defense to develop a strategic plan for expanding distance learning initiatives, as well as Executive Order 13111 (President William J. Clinton, 12 January 1999). The Executive Order, titled “Using Technology to Improve Training Opportunities for Federal Government Employees,” established a task force and advisory committee to explore how federal training programs, initiatives, and policies can better support lifelong learning through the use of learning technologies and to provide learning standards, specifications, and applications which can be sustained and extended to incorporate new technologies and learning science as they occur.

Shortly after President Bill Clinton signed Executive Order 13111, the Pentagon released the Department of Defense Strategic Plan for Advanced Digital Learning (April 30, 1999) and the corresponding Department of Defense Implementation Plan for Advanced Distributed Learning (May 19, 2000). This strategy empowers the ADL Initiative to:

- Influence the development/use of common industry standards
- Enable acquisition of interoperable tools and content
- Create a robust and dynamic network infrastructure for distribution
- Enable the modernization of supporting resources
- Engender cultural change to move from “classroom-centric” to “learner-centric”

Since its inception in the 1990s, the ADL Initiative has achieved several notable milestones, including the development of SCORM, ADL PlugFests, xAPI, and the Total Learning Architecture. More information about the history and products of ADL can be found in the ADL-sponsored book, Learning on Demand: ADL and the Future of e-Learning, published in 2010.

== Organization ==
The ADL Initiative reports to the Defense Human Resources Activity (DHRA), under the Director, DHRA. Originally, the ADL Initiative reported to the OSD Director for Readiness and Training Policy and Programs in the Under Secretary of Defense for Personnel and Readiness (USD(P&R)) chain of command. Until April 18, 2021, the ADL Initiative reported to the Deputy Assistant Secretary of Defense for Force Education and Training (DASD(FE&T)), who reported to the Assistant Secretary of Defense for Readiness (ASD(R)), who in turn reported to the Under Secretary for Personnel and Readiness (USD(P&R)) within the Office of the Secretary of Defense.

ADL Initiative Directors

Don Johnson	1998–2002
Robert L. (“Bob”) Wisher, Ph.D.	2002–2009
Paul Jesukiewicz, Interim Acting Director	2009–2010
Kristy Murray, Ph.D.	2010–2014
Paula Durlach, Ph.D., Interim Acting Director	2014–2015
Sae Schatz, Ph.D.	2015—

== Subject Areas ==
ADL uses the term “distributed learning” broadly, to refer to all network-centric learning technologies and their corresponding best practices for their use. Similarly, ADL uses the term “learning” to include education, training, operational performance support, and other forms of ad hoc, just-in-time, or self-directed learning. Within these topical areas, ADL conducts research and development (Budget Area 6.3, Advanced Technology Development), facilitates coordination, and assists with the implementation of emerging science and technologies. More precisely, ADL's work emphasizes the following six areas: [7]

- e-Learning (e.g., traditional web-based courseware)
- Mobile learning (m-Learning) and associated mobile performance support
- Web-based virtual worlds and simulations
- Learning analytics and performance modeling
- Associated learning theory (e.g., pedagogy, andragogy, instructional design)
- Distributed learning interoperability specifications

== SCORM ==
When ADL was established, the use of Learning Management Systems (LMSs) was increasing rapidly, but the content delivered through those systems remained separated (locked into silos). For example, while the Navy and Army have standard courses with similar content, that content could not be shared and reused from one service to another because their LMSs would not allow it. The silo’d nature of content delivered through LMSs was not cost efficient, and became one of ADL's first challenges to tackle resulting in the development of the SCORM (sharable content object reference model).

SCORM integrates related technical standards, specifications, and guidelines intended to support reusable, interoperable, and durable learning content and systems. SCORM content can be delivered through a SCORM-conformant LMS using the same version of SCORM. Department of Defense Instruction 1322.26 directs DoD components to continue using SCORM for asynchronous course-tracking capabilities delivered through a web browser. SCORM has also been widely used in academia, industry, and government.

== Experience API ==
In 2011, ADL recognized the need for a software specification that tracks learning experiences that occur outside of a LMS and a web browser. As a result, ADL issued a Broad Agency Announcement (BAA) asking for assistance in improving SCORM. The BAA was awarded to Rustici Software, a Nashville-based software company experienced with SCORM. Rustici Software conducted numerous interviews with the e-learning community to determine where improvements needed to be made and developed the research version of the Experience API specification as a result. This process was called Project Tin Can. The moniker “Tin Can API” was derived from Project Tin Can. When version 1.0 was officially released in April 2013, the specification was dubbed “xAPI” but by that time, some people already knew the specification by the original moniker. The Experience API (xAPI) allows the capture of big data on human performance, along with associated instructional content or performance context information. xAPI applies “activity streams” to tracking data and provides sub-APIs to access and store information about state and content. This enables nearly dynamic tracking of activities from any platform or software system—from traditional LMSs to mobile devices, simulations, wearables, physical beacons, and more.

== Department of Defense Instruction 1322.26 ==
Under delegated authority, ADL stewards DoDI 1322.26, “Development, Management, and Delivery of Distributed Learning.” This DoDI provides guidance to support implementation of DoD Directive (DoDD) 1322.18, “Military Training.”

== See also ==
- Computer-aided instruction
- Educational technology
- Learning management system
