= Broad Agency Announcement =

The Broad Agency Announcement (BAA) is a technique for United States government agencies to solicit proposals from outside groups for certain research and development. The agency will then select proposals to fund as contracts or grants. BAAs are broad in their subject matter and focus on advancing science rather than acquiring specific products, which are instead covered under a Request for proposals.

BAAs pertains to basic and applied research, and certain early-stage development work. They are not intended for acquisition "related to the development of a specific system or hardware procurement." It may only be used "when meaningful proposals with varying technical/scientific approaches can reasonably be foreseen."

The technique may be used to acquire "scientific study and experimentation directed toward advancing the state-of-the-art or increasing knowledge or understanding." The technique shares the name of the means of initiating it. The announcement, published in Federal Business Opportunities, describes "broadly defined areas of interest". Proposals received in response to the announcement are evaluated through a peer or scientific review process, unlike the more traditional technique for evaluation of proposals under FAR Subpart 15.3 An award under the technique is treated as meeting the statutory requirement in the Competition in Contracting Act for full and open competition (vis a no-bid contract).

== See also ==
- Funding opportunity announcement
