= Aviation Industry Computer-Based Training Committee =

The Aviation Industry Computer-Based Training Committee (AICC) was an international association of technology-based training professionals that existed from 1988 to 2014. The AICC developed guidelines for aviation industry in the development, delivery, and evaluation of CBT, WBT, and related training technologies.

AICC specifications were usually designed to be general purpose (not necessarily Aviation Specific) so that learning technology vendors can spread their costs across multiple markets and thus provide products (needed by the Aviation Industry) at a lower cost. This strategy resulted in AICC specifications having broad acceptance and relevance to non-aviation and aviation users alike.

== History ==
The AICC was formed in 1988 by Aircraft manufacturers (Boeing, Airbus, and McDonnell Douglas) to address Airline concerns about non-standard computing (cost) issues arising from the proliferation of new multimedia training materials emerging at that time.

In 1989, the AICC published computing platform recommendations for CBT, training media. A PC-platform was established as the primary delivery platform for CBT media.

In 1992, the AICC produced a digital audio interoperability specification for DOS based platforms. This specification allowed multiple CBT vendors to use a single audio card. AICC audio drivers were produced for Elan, SoundBlaster, WICAT, and other audio cards. A large number of older legacy CBT applications still use this specification today.

In 1993, the AICC produced what is widely regarded as the first runtime interoperability specification for Learning Management Systems (LMS) a.k.a. CMI Systems. This AICC specification (CMI001 - AICC/CMI Guidelines For Interoperability) was originally designed for CD-ROM/LAN (local file-based) operation and was updated in January 1998 to add a web-based interface called HACP (HTTP-based AICC/CMI Protocol). In September 1999, the CMI001 specification was updated to add a JavaScript API runtime interface. The runtime environment data model and API used in the SCORM specification is a derivative of this work.

== Current ==
The AICC HACP standard for CMI is widely used by Learning Management Systems and other systems to call content and assessments. Although it is pre-XML, it is very robust and unambiguous and many consider it to be more secure and reliable than alternatives such as SCORM, especially for content or assessments hosted on web servers not collocated with the calling system (e.g. Cross Domain Communication).

An emerging standard is the AICC PENS standard, which lets content creating tools send a manifest to an LMS easily. (See CMI010 - Package Exchange Notification Services). The September 2006 AICC meeting included a Plugfest where vendors demonstrated PENS interoperability.

In November 2010, the AICC announced that it would begin work on a replacement of its existing CMI specification. This effort was later given the name "CMI-5". A SOAP-based specification for CMI-5 was drafted in May 2012 but was never formally released.

In October 2012, the AICC announced that it had adopted the Experience API (xAPI) specification (a.k.a. "Tin Can") for its CMI-5 effort starting a significant re-design that is currently in progress.

The AICC coordinated its efforts with other learning technology specifications organizations engaged in similar work such as IMS Global, OKI, ADL, IEEE/LTSC, LETSI, and ISO/SC36.

In December 2014, the AICC formally announced that it had dissolved citing declining participation. The AICC transferred the CMI-5 effort and its document archive to the ADL.

See AICC Document Archive - Hosted by ADL

== cmi5 Status ==
cmi5 is still currently under development. It is a specification developed by the ADL (Advanced Distributed Learning) Initiative as a modern replacement for SCORM, built on the xAPI (Experience API) framework. It's designed to manage and track learning experiences, particularly in LMS environments.In 2022, the cmi5 Working Group, facilitated by the ADL Initiative, submitted a Project Authorization Request (PAR) to the IEEE Learning Technology Standards Committee (LTSC) to formalize cmi5 as an IEEE standard. This move aims to establish cmi5 under a globally recognized standards body, much like xAPI (IEEE 9274.1.1) before it.

In 2025 the IEEE standardization process is ongoing (P9274.3.1 - xAPI cmi5 Working Group). The PAR has been approved, and the cmi5 specification is being refined for IEEE adoption, potentially as a "2.0" version incorporating updates from the working group. However, it's not yet fully ratified as an IEEE standard—standardization can take years due to consensus-building, revisions, and balloting.
