= Self-paced instruction =

Self-paced instruction is any kind of instruction that proceeds based on learner response. The content itself can be curriculum, corporate training, technical tutorials, or any other subject that does not require the immediate response of an instructor. Self-paced instruction is constructed in such a way that the learner proceeds from one topic or segment to the next at their own speed. This type of instruction is becoming increasingly popular as the education world shifts from the classroom to the Internet.

== See also ==
- Autodidacticism
- Autonomous learning (disambiguation)
