= IEEE-ISTO =

- Founded: January 1999
- Headquarters: Piscataway, New Jersey, US
- Website: www.ieee-isto.org

The Industry Standards and Technology Organization (ISTO) is a not-for-profit organization established by the Institute of Electrical and Electronics Engineers (IEEE) in 1999. Its purpose is to accelerate the development and adoption of technology standards by helping its member organizations set up as legal entities and support their ongoing operation. Organized as a global 501(c)(6) not-for-profit corporation, it functions as a federation of industry alliances, consortia, and trade groups.

By contracting to join the ISTO federation, alliances and other collective startups are able to form a legal and autonomous not-for-profit collective entity. ISTO’s legal infrastructure offloads from member alliances the annual obligations of entity insurance coverage, annual financial audits and annual tax filings. On a daily basis, ISTO provides operational support to its member programs.

== History ==
The ISTO was formed in January 1999 to provide the IEEE with more flexibility in supporting standards creation by groups that found the conventional IEEE process of standards creation ineffective.

After eighteen months of planning and development, the IEEE announced the formation of a new, independent, not-for-profit corporation named the IEEE Industry Standards and Technology Organization (ISTO).

The formation of the ISTO was approved by the IEEE Board of Directors in November 1998, based upon a five-year business plan. The goal of the ISTO was to provide a link between standards development activity in informal consortia and the formal standards activities of the IEEE. By offering a wide variety of management, operational and technical support to industry participants setting specifications outside of the traditional process used by SDOs (standards development organizations) like the IEEE Standards Association, the ISTO would meet an industry need while maintaining an affiliation with IEEE.

When the ISTO was formed, the IEEE was the sole founding member. IEEE provided the ISTO with a line of credit to fund initial operations which was repaid years later as ISTO continued to grow. The ISTO headquarters was located within the IEEE Operations Center in Piscataway, NJ.

== Member programs ==
In 2000, the ISTO Staff and the Board of Directors undertook a marketing and promotion campaign which resulted in the Medical Device Communications Industry Group (MDCIG), the Printer Working Group (PWG), and the Nexus5001 Forum becoming the first three programs of ISTO.

As the year 2000 drew to a close, the number of Programs supported by the ISTO had grown to eight VoiceXML Forum, MessageML, SyncML, the Broadband Wireless internet Forum (BWIF) and the 1355 Association.

The concept of the ISTO as an umbrella organization under which industry standards activities could be performed efficiently and successfully had been demonstrated and the opportunities for new Programs continued to grow. The addition of three more Programs in 2001 [Customized learning Experience Online (CLEO) lab, Wireless Village and Mobile Games Interoperability Forum (MGIF)] brought the number of Programs to eleven.

With the ongoing increase of new ISTO programs over the years, it became necessary to add staff resources and tools to provide professional support.

== Market adoptions ==
The staff give advice on strategic and tactical program management, ISTO has cooperated with over 50 industry alliances and trade groups and worked on these technologies:

- Telecom/mobile interfaces
- Internet of things
- High performance computing
- Wireless power charging
- Datacenter networks optimization
- Blockchain technology
- eHealth
- Integrated voice response
- Electronic design automation (EDA)
- Lighting
- Smart cities

== Support offering ==
ISTO offers the following:

- Legal Infrastructure (including Tax, Audit, and Insurance obligations)
- Strategic Consulting and Program Management
- Open Source and Alliance Management Tooling
- Standardization and Certification Programs
- Financial/Accounting Management
- Membership Administration
- Contract Administration
- Event Planning and Management
- PR and Marketing Communications
- Legal Registrations, Licensing, Compliance

=== Legal infrastructure (including Tax, Audit, Insurance obligations) ===
Infrastructure – ISTO's legal framework enables its not-for-profit legal status to be shared with its member alliances. ISTO also fulfills IRS obligations for member alliances as it includes member alliances in its annual financial audit and annual tax filing.

Liability Insurance/Indemnification – ISTO carries a comprehensive package of insurance policies (renewed annually) to cover all member alliances organized under its legal umbrella. Coverage includes policy clauses such as Directors and Officers (D&O), Errors and Omissions (E&O) and general liability.

ISTO Membership – The ISTO Federation allows for member programs to participate in cross-program activities such as ISTO Program Leadership Caucuses, the ISTO Annual Member Meeting and the nomination and election of ISTO Director candidates.

Independent Formation – ISTO manages the self-incorporation of member alliances and oversees the submission and filing of IRS Form 1024 for member alliances to apply for not-for-profit status. ISTO is knowledgeable of all legal, tax and audit requirements for 501(c)(6) entities and ensures legal compliance for new not-for-profit organizations.

=== Strategic consulting and program management ===
Formation Assistance – ISTO supports the formation of industry alliances, assisting with membership structures, mission statements, and Board formation as well as drafting governing documents including Bylaws, Intellectual Property Rights (IPR) policies and Membership Agreements. ISTO sets up bank accounts, financial statements, contract templates and develops brand identity.

Board Secretariat – ISTO serves as Board Secretariat for a number of organizations around the world.

Association Management– ISTO provides executive-level strategic and tactical support to meet organizational goals and committee/working group objectives, respectively.

=== Open source and alliance management tooling ===
Membership Management Systems that are fully integrated with group calendaring, committee dashboards, eVoting modules, wikis, member rosters, email reflectors and secure document/ communications repositories Collaboration tools to support remote meetings, online communities, user groups and online specifications development Website hosting and content/domain management Systems administration and development and management of databases, email programs, internal communications and other needs Open source tools including open source repositories for code development and collaboration and other Web 2.0 tools Media monitoring to measure news about member organizations and/or related technologies

=== Standardization and certification programs ===
ISTO supports the setup and ongoing administration of various models for standardization, compliance/interoperability test programs, and licensing by its member alliances.

=== financial/accounting management ===
ISTO provides accounting and financial management support that adheres to GAAP (Generally Accepted Accounting Practice) and has received top ratings in its annual financial audit. ISTO supports daily AP/AR and invoicing requirements for member Programs as well as the annual obligations of financial audits and tax filings.

=== Membership and contract administration ===
ISTO provides membership administration from recruitment to processing to retention, managing member relations and analyzing membership trends.

=== Event planning and management ===
ISTO supports member meetings around the world and plans for high-profile symposiums and technical summits.

=== PR and marketing communications ===
ISTO manages member alliance PR, social media, blogs, vlogs, e-newsletters, surveys, evaluations, webinars, white papers, webinars, member surveys, infographics, branded materials, and website and logo development.

=== Legal registrations, licensing, compliance ===
ISTO handles registrations a licensing of member Program IP.
