= Learning management system =

Educational software application

A Learning Management System (LMS) is a software application for the administration, documentation, tracking, reporting, automation, and delivery of educational courses, training programs, materials, or learning and development programs. The learning management system concept emerged directly from e-Learning. Learning management systems make up the largest segment of the learning system market. The first introduction of the LMS was in the late 1990s. LMSs have been adopted by almost all higher education institutions in the English-speaking world. Learning management systems have experienced a massive growth in usage because of the emphasis on remote learning during the COVID-19 pandemic.

Learning management systems were designed to identify training and learning gaps using analytics and reporting. LMSs are focused on online learning delivery but also support a range of uses, serving as a platform for online content, including both asynchronous and synchronous courses. In the higher education space, an LMS may offer classroom management for instructor-led training or a flipped classroom. Modern LMSs include intelligent algorithms to make automated recommendations for courses based on a user's skill profile as well as extract metadata from learning materials to make such recommendations even more accurate.

== Purpose ==
An LMS delivers and manages all types of content, including videos, courses, workshops, and documents. In the education and higher education markets, an LMS will include a variety of functionality similar to corporate LMSs, with features such as rubrics, teacher- and instructor-facilitated learning, a discussion board, and often a syllabus. A syllabus is rarely a feature in the corporate LMS, although courses may start with a heading-level index to give learners an overview of topics covered.

== History ==
Several historical phases of distance education preceded the development of the LMS.

=== Correspondence teaching ===
The first known document of correspondence teaching dates back to 1723, through the advertisement in the Boston Gazette of Caleb Phillips, professor of shorthand, offering teaching materials and tutorials. The first testimony of a bi-directional communication organized correspondence course comes from England, in 1840, when Isaac Pitman initiated a shorthand course, wherein he sent a passage of the Bible to students, who would send it back in full transcription. The success of the course led to the founding of the phonographic correspondence society in 1843. The pioneering milestone in distance language teaching was in 1856 by Charles Toussaint and Gustav Langenscheidt, who began the first European institution of distance learning. This is the first known instance of the use of materials for independent language study.

=== Multimedia teaching: The emergence and development of the distance learning idea ===
The concept of e-learning began to develop in the early 20th century, marked by the emergence of audio-video communication systems for remote teaching. In 1909, E.M. Forster published his story 'The Machine Stops' and explained the benefits of using audio communication to deliver lectures to remote audiences.

In 1924, Sidney L. Pressey developed the first teaching machine, which offered multiple types of practical exercises and question formats. Nine years later, University of Alberta Professor M.E. Zerte transformed this machine into a problem cylinder capable of comparing problems and solutions.

This, in a sense, was "multimedia" because it used several media formats to reach students and deliver instruction. Later, printed materials would be joined by telephone, radio broadcasts, TV broadcasts, audio, and videotapes.

The earliest networked learning system was the Plato Learning Management system (PLM) developed in the 1970s by Control Data Corporation.

=== Telematic teaching ===
In the 1980s, modern telecommunications started to be used in education. Computers became prominent in the daily operations of higher education institutions and as instruments for student learning. Computer-aided teaching aimed to integrate technical and educational means. The trend then shifted to video communication, as a result of which University of Houston decided to hold telecast classes to their students for approximately 13–15 hours a week. The classes took place in 1953, while in 1956 Robin McKinnon Wood and Gordon Pask released the first adaptive teaching system for corporate environments, SAKI. The idea of automating teaching operations also inspired the University of Illinois experts to develop their Programmed Logic for Automated Teaching Operations (PLATO), which enabled users to exchange content regardless of their location. In the period between 1970 and 1980, educational venues were rapidly considering the idea of computerizing courses, including the Western Behavioral Sciences Institute from California, which introduced the first accredited online-taught degree.

=== Teaching through the internet: The appearance of the first LMS ===
The history of the application of computers to education is filled with broadly descriptive terms such as computer-managed instruction (CMI), and integrated learning systems (ILS), computer-based instruction (CBI), computer-assisted instruction (CAI), and computer-assisted learning (CAL). These terms describe drill-and-practice programs, more sophisticated tutorials, and more individualized instruction, respectively. The term is currently used to describe several different educational computer applications. FirstClass by SoftArc, used by the United Kingdom's Open University in the 1990s and 2000s to deliver online learning across Europe, was one of the earliest internet-based LMSs.

The first fully featured Learning Management System (LMS) was called EKKO, developed and released by Norway's NKI Distance Education Network in 1991. Three years later, New Brunswick's NB Learning Network presented a similar system designed for DOS-based teaching, and devoted exclusively to business learners.

=== COVID-19 and learning management systems ===
The suspension of in-school learning caused by the COVID-19 pandemic led to a dramatic shift in how teachers and students at all levels interact with one another and with learning materials. UNESCO estimated that as of May 25, 2020, approximately 990,324,537 learners, or 56.6% of all enrolled students, had been affected by COVID-19-related school closures. In many countries, online education through the use of Learning Management Systems became the focal point of teaching and learning. For example, statistics from a university's LMS during the initial school closure period (March to June 2020) indicate that student submissions and activity nearly doubled compared to pre-pandemic usage levels.

Student satisfaction with LMS usage during this period is closely tied to the information quality contained within LMS modules and maintaining student self-efficacy. From the teacher perspective, a study of K-12 teachers in Finland reported high levels of acceptance for LMS technology, however, training support and developing methods for maintaining student engagement are key to long-term success. In developing nations, the transition to LMS usage faced many challenges, which included a lower number of colleges and universities using LMSs before the pandemic, technological infrastructure limitations, and negative attitudes toward technology amongst users.

== Technical aspects ==
An LMS can be either hosted locally or by a vendor. A vendor-hosted cloud system typically follows a SaaS (software as a service) model. All data in a vendor-hosted system is stored by the supplier and accessed by users over the internet on a computer or mobile device. Vendor-hosted systems are typically easier to use and require less technical expertise. An LMS that is locally hosted stores all LMS data on users' internal servers. Locally hosted LMS software will often be open-source, meaning users will acquire the software and its code (either through payment or free of charge). With this, the user can modify and maintain the software through an internal team. Individuals and smaller organizations tend to stick with cloud-based systems due to the cost of internal hosting and maintenance.

There are a variety of integration strategies for embedding content into LMSs, including AICC, xAPI (also called 'Tin Can'), SCORM (Sharable Content Object Reference Model), and LTI (Learning Tools Interoperability).

Through an LMS, teachers may create and integrate course materials, articulate learning goals, align content and assessments, track student progress, and develop customized tests. An LMS allows the communication of learning objectives and organizes learning timelines. An LMS perk is that it delivers learning content and tools straight to learners, and assessment can be automated. It can also reach marginalized groups through special settings. Such systems have built-in customizable features, including assessment and tracking. Thus, learners can see their progress in real time, and instructors can monitor and communicate on the effectiveness of learning. One of the most important features of LMS is trying to create a streamline communication between learners and instructors. Such systems, besides facilitating online learning, tracking learning progress, providing digital learning tools, managing communication, and possibly selling content, may also be used to provide various communication features.

== Features ==
=== Managing courses, users, and roles ===
Learning management systems may be used to create professionally structured course content. The teacher can add text, images, videos, PDFs, tables, links, and text formatting, interactive tests, slideshows, etc. Moreover, they can create different types of users, such as teachers, students, parents, visitors, and editors (hierarchies). It helps control which content students can access, track studying progress, and engage students with contact tools. Teachers can manage courses and modules, enroll students or set up self-enrollment.

=== Online assessment ===
An LMS can enable instructors to create automated assessments and assignments that learners can access and submit online. Most platforms allow a variety of question types, such as: one- or multi-line answers; multiple-choice answers; ordering; free text; matching; essay; true or false/yes or no; fill-in-the-gaps; agreement scale; and offline tasks.

=== User feedback ===
Students can exchange feedback with both teachers and their peers through the LMS. Teachers may create discussion groups to allow students to provide feedback, share their knowledge on topics, and increase interaction in the course. Students' feedback is an instrument that helps teachers improve their work, identify what to add or remove from a course, and ensure students feel comfortable and included.

=== Synchronous and asynchronous learning ===
Students can either learn asynchronously (on demand, self-paced) through course content such as pre-recorded videos, PDF, SCORM (Sharable Content Object Reference Model), discussion forums, or they can undertake synchronous learning utilizing video conference communication, live discussions, and chats.

=== Learning analytics ===
Learning management systems will often incorporate dashboards to track student or user progress. They can then report on key metrics such as completion rates, attendance data, and likelihood of success. Utilising these metrics can help facilitators better understand gaps in user knowledge.

== Learning management industry ==
In the relatively new LMS market, commercial providers for corporate applications and education range from new entrants to those that entered the market in 1990. In addition to commercial packages, many open-source solutions are available.

As of 2023, in the U.S. higher-education market, the leading LMSs by number of institutions are Canvas (Instructure), D2L Brightspace, Blackboard Learn (Anthology), and Moodle. According to the "State of Higher Ed LMS Market for US and Canada: Year-End 2023 Edition", Canvas holds approximately 41 % institutional market share, followed by Blackboard at 17%; Moodle and Brightspace are tied at about 16 % each.

Many users of LMSs use an authoring tool to create content, which is then hosted on an LMS. In some cases, LMSs that do use a standard include a primitive authoring tool for basic content manipulation. More modern systems, in particular SaaS solutions, have chosen not to adopt a standard and instead offer rich course authoring tools. There are several standards for creating and integrating complex content into an LMS, including AICC, SCORM, xAPI, and Learning Tools Interoperability. However, using SCORM or an alternative standardized course protocol is not always required and can be restrictive when used unnecessarily.

Evaluation of LMSs is a complex task, and substantial research supports various forms of evaluation, including iterative processes that assess students' experiences and approaches to learning.

== Advantages and disadvantages ==
Both supporters and critics of LMSs recognize the importance of developing 21st century skills; however, the controversy lies in whether they are practical for teachers and students alike.

In one study, an LMS led to a reported higher computer self-efficacy, while participants reported being less satisfied with the learning process that is achieved in the LMS. A study among Indian students has suggested that a negative experience with an LMS can leave "the learner with a passive, un-engaging experience, leading to incomplete learning and low performance".

=== Advantages ===
There are six major advantages of LMS, which in themselves constitute the concept of LMS.

- Interoperability: Data standards on LMS allow information to be exchanged from one system to another
- Accessibility: The consistent layout used on the LMS provides students with disabilities a better opportunity to access web content.
- Reusability: Reusability refers to the LMS system's ability to be reused for educational content. A critical aspect of lowering the high expenses of developing educational experiences in e-learning settings is.
- Durability: Due to the rising adoption of technology in academics, the growth of the LMS market was valued at $24.05 billion in 2024 and is projected to grow at a CAGR of 19.9% from 2025 to 2030.
- Maintenance ability: LMS allows developers to continually enhance their software and better adapt it to their user base.
- Adaptability: LMS is always improving, updating, and learning new behaviors quickly. LMS has been active since 1990s and keeps adjusting to the changing society today.

=== Disadvantages ===
- Teachers have to be willing to adapt their curricula from face-to-face lectures to online lectures.
- There is the potential for instructors to try to directly translate existing support materials into courses, which can result in very low interactivity and engagement for learners if not done well.

== See also ==
- 8 learning management questions – Set of questions for teachers
- Competency management system
- Educational technology – Use of technology in education to enhance learning and teaching (e-learning)
- Intelligent tutoring system – Computer system to provide instruction to learners
- LAMS – Learning Activity Management System
- Learning objects
- Learning Record Store (LRS)
- List of learning management systems
- Massive open online course
- Student information system – Software for educational institutions to manage student and school data
- Virtual learning environment

== Bibliography ==
- Levensaler, Leighann; Laurano, Madeline (2009), Talent Management Systems 2010, Bersin & Associates, archived from the original on 11 October 2009
