= Edu-sharing =

E-learning integration solution

edu-sharing
- Developers: DFG-project CampusContent, edu-sharing community
- Stable release: 8.0 final / March 2023
- Operating system: Linux (SLES, OpenSuse, Ubuntu, Debian, CentOS)
- Type: Content management system
- License: GPL
- Website: edu-sharing.com

edu-sharing is an open-source e-learning integration solution. The core of the system is a repository for the cooperative creation, management, and usage of objects such as files, links, instances of integrated tools and courses of connected learning management systems such as Moodle. Through open interfaces, different edu-sharing repositories can be connected to each other as well as to diverse repositories or repository networks. This enables the exchange of content and educational know-how across the borders of systems and organizations and between disparate learning management systems and other e-learning tools connected to such repositories.

== Application ==
edu-sharing is mainly targeting educational applications. In this context it is used to:

- extend the document management functionality of connected learning management systems by offering a dedicated ECMS for educational content
- publish content stored in edu-sharing and connected sources by means of didactical search engines
- connect e-learning tools across the borders of organisations

== Features ==
Content can be managed using a web-based user interface or via WebDAV. The system offers different search options such as a faceted search. edu-sharing supports arbitrary metadata sets such as LOM and Dublin Core. For the usage of content stored in the repository in an educational scenario, the system offers interfaces to systems such as Moodle, ILIAS, OLAT, and MediaWiki. A novel rendering service enables the usage of content that is not natively supported by learning management systems. Examples for such content items are SCORM-courses, QTI-compliant tests and drills, H5P-objects audio and video files or courses of specific learning management systems. To facilitate the re-use of content, users may attach licenses (e.g. Creative Commons) to their content. Compared to other repository systems for learning content, edu-sharing offers some outstanding features:

- autonomy (Each repository is managed independently (for instance by an educational institution) Each installation forms an independent content-pool.)
- secure working spaces (Single users or groups can cooperatively manage content in private environments. The publication of content is optional)
- so-called "collections" for the organisation of content in structures independent from their storage location to map syllabi and others
- interfaces to learning environments
- interfaces to tools such as Etherpad, which can be instantiated via LTI
- Solr open source enterprise search
- media transcoding for cross-platform usage of audio and video files

== edu-sharing association ==
The edu-sharing network is coordinated by edu-sharing.net e.V., a non-profit association based in Weimar, Germany. The association also runs offices in Chongqing, China, and Krems, Austria. The association was founded in February 2010 by key members of the DFG-funded project and competence center in e-learning, CampusContent, supporters from the IT industry who are involved in the project’s technology development, and members of the system's user community. The association's mission is to drive the future development of open-source software through a growing network of stakeholders, including IT-service providers, content owners from various domains, educational experts, and content and methodology users. As part of the yearly summit, the members of the association vote for the community roadmap, which accounts for 25% of the total roadmap votes.

== History ==
The edu-sharing technology is the outcome of several years of research and development activities in the "CampusContent" project carried out at FernUniversität in Hagen. The project received a major grant from the DFG from 2004 to 2009. CampusContent was initiated and directed by Bernd Krämer and inspired by an earlier EC-funded project, EuropeMMM, he was involved in from 1996 to 1999. EuropeMMM demonstrated for the first time the joint development of multimedia materials among authors, publishers, and educators, and their customised supply to users through a shared content repository. CampusContent extended this idea to the development of a competence center for the production, collection, quality assurance, distribution and re-use of modular multimedia content and codified educational know-how. CampusContent targeted academic education and promoted the idea of open educational resources and open source.

Early during the funding period of CampusContent, schools raised an increasing need for content-sharing technology. To emphasize the widening of the technology's target population, the founders of the association edu-sharing.net decided to promote the technology under the new name edu-sharing. Its further development through edu-sharing therefore initially addressed the needs for applications in schools, which contributed to a considerable spread throughout Germany and neighboring countries.

== Technology ==
The edu-sharing repository is based on the Alfresco document management system. The GUI uses Angular JS. The rendering service uses PHP.

== Literature ==
- Michael Klebl, Bernd J. Krämer, Annett Zobel: From content to practice: Sharing educational practice in edu-sharing. British Journal of Educational Technology, 41(2010), Nr. 6, S. 936-951 ().
- Bernd J. Krämer, Michael Klebl, Annett Zobel: Sharing Educational Knowledge and Best Practices in Edu-sharing. In: Second International Conference on Mobile, Hybrid, and On-line Learning, Saint Maarten, The Netherlands, Antilles, 2010, ISBN 978-0-7695-3955-3, S. 53–59 ().
- Bernd J. Krämer, Michael Klebl, Annett Zobel: edu-sharing – das Portal zur Vernetzung von Anbietern und Nutzern digitaler Lernressourcen. Waxmann Verlag GmbH, Münster 2010, ISBN 978-3-8309-2326-8, S. 20–36 ().
