= TAO (electronic assessment) =

Computer-based testing software

- Developers: Open Assessment Technologies S.A., LIST (formerly CRP Henri Tudor), EMACS research unit of the University of Luxembourg
- Stable release: 3.5.0 / January 2022; 4 years ago
- Written in: PHP
- Operating system: Cross-platform
- Type: Course management system
- License: GPLv2
- Website: taotesting.com

Testing Assisté par Ordinateur (English: Computer Based Testing; abbreviated TAO) is a French electronic assessment system.

The TAO framework provides an open architecture for computer-assisted test development and delivery, with the potential to respond to the whole range of evaluation needs. It provides to all the actors of the entire computer-based assessment process a comprehensive set of functionalities enabling the creation, the management, and the delivery of electronic assessments. The TAO platform is developed by the EMACS research unit of the University of Luxembourg and the SSI department of the Centre de Recherche Public Henri Tudor.

== Overview ==
The TAO framework is an open-source project which provides a general and open architecture for computer-assisted test development and delivery. The open source project only delivers a limited amount of modules as there is no Results Management. As upcoming evaluation needs will imply the collaboration among a large number of stakeholders situated at different institutional levels and with very different needs for assessment tools, the TAO framework has the purpose to provide a modular framework for collaborative distributed test development.

In order to reach this goal, the testing problem has been broken down into its constitutive parts:

- Item development and management
- Subject management
- Test development and management
- Group management
- Test delivery management
- Results management

These parts are implemented under the form of multiple specialized modules connected in a peer-to-peer network. As the TAO architecture should fit into many different use cases, there is no central node in the system (the whole network of TAO nodes is an open-system with no global consistency) and it is assumed that there cannot be an a priori model for each data domain that reaches consensus within all the actors. On the contrary, each module owner or user is free to build the model that best corresponds to his own view. In order to support this model diversity, TAO modules are equipped with advanced modelling functionalities allowing users to build dynamically their own model and share data organized according to different models.

== Features ==
General features

- Multilingual application - user interface as well as data is supported in most languages (European languages, Japanese, Chinese, Korean, Turkish, etc.)
- Web application - full Internet access without installation of any client application, except well-known and widely used browser plug-ins.
- Groupware – collaboration of diverse users independent of location and time
- User management
- Rights management
- Classification, modelisation of resources
- Open for new graphical layouts
- Fulltext search
- API providing all services (to access, modify data, manage users, …)
- Semantic web standard (RDF/RDFS)
- Import/export functions (ontologies)

Item development and management

- QTI 2.1 and 2.2 items import, export and editing
- WYSIWYG authoring
- Integration of any multimedia resource (images, sound, text, videos, animations)
- Items sharing and item banking
- Preview of created item during design phase

Test development and management

- Selection of items among different item modules
- Support for QTI 2.2 test import, export and editing

Subject management

- Assignation of logins/passwords for subjects to access tests
- Generic process to formalize any sort of dataset for a set of subjects using the common set of input components

Group management

- Populate groups with subjects of different subject modules)
- Assign tests to a group of selected subjects

Test delivery management

- Test is available on any system (Windows, Mac OS X, Linux) using any browser (Mozilla, Chrome, Edge, Safari, Opera)
- Online- and Offline-testing
- Deliver assessment offline but store answers
- Delivery planning

Results management

- Wizard to build tables with results
- Export results to QTI 2.2 results or CSV files
- Wizard to create report with multiple scores combined

== TAO Architecture ==
The description of the platform architecture at the current stage is organized on a component basis. A part of these components are independent from the computer-assisted testing domain.

The TAO platform should be considered as a particular instantiation (for a particular purpose) of a more general platform dedicated to the collaborative and distributed management of web resources and of the ontologies describing these resources. The more specific components will be presented afterward. The TAO platform consists in a series of interconnected modules. Each module is a specialization of a more generic kernel application called Generis4.

The specialization consists in adding a specific model to the kernel defining the domain of specialization, several plug-ins providing specific functionalities to the specialization according to the domain and relying on specific properties of the model, possibly some external applications, and a specific (optional) user graphical interface.

== TAO Modules ==
TAO is designed as a modular system. This decentralised structure is necessary on one hand to maintain the anonymity of the Subjects and on the other hand to allow the collaboration among several users, to change items and tests.

The modules may be placed on the same server or on different servers connected through the internet or local area networks.

There is a distinction between the portal of test execution (Delivery Server) and the servers of the different modules, providing the information about Subjects, Groups, Items, Tests, Deliveries and Results.

In the Subject module the testees are recorded and managed. Its flexibility allows the design of datasheets (e.g. name, address, birthday, gender, etc.). The Subjects may be assigned to sets according to the specific assessment context (Human resources management, education, edumetric monitoring, etc.).

The subjects may be subsumed in regard to global features and classifications in the Group module. The main object of this module is to assign the favoured test(s) to the appointed group. The Subjects and Tests that belong to one group may be originated from different modules on different servers. This module establishes the basis to run a test.

The Item module enables the creation and design of items, exercises. Different kinds of templates are provided to the item authors like Multiple Choice Question, puzzle design, Fill-in-the-gap, etc. Any other demands may be added within the scope of further development.

A selection of favourite Items – originated from different modules on different servers - is combined to a test in the Test module. Furthermore, the test mode (sequencing, scoring, cumulating, etc.) and layout is configured here.

In the Delivery module the test administrator will be able to define test campaigns, constraints on test execution (Test may be made available during a given period, Tests may be assigned with a maximum number of executions). This module will also enable to select on which Result module all results should be sent to.

The Test Delivery Server provides the compiled tests via URL. The Subjects will access their assigned Test(s) through their logins and passwords. Finally all the results of passed tests with referring Subject, Group, Item and Test specific data as well as the individual data collected during test execution are stored and managed in the Result module. Currently there is no real Results module available (if you expect to see more than a list of a number of students tests with links).

== Item templates ==
Tests or surveys consist of items (exercises, questions) that may have different characteristics. These characteristics are defined by Item Templates. They describe the way an item is presented.

On the basis of a certain template an item is filled with text and/or multimedia elements, the Item Content. This process is called item authoring.

The main constituents of a particular item are its underlying Item Template and its specific Item Content.

TAO provides the following Item templates (types of items):

- QTI: QTI covers 17 interaction types
- PCI: Custom Interactions that follow the QTI standard

== Publications ==
- Latour, T. and Martin, R., ERCIM News, 71, October (2007) 32-33. TAO, An Open and Versatile Computer-Based Assessment Platform Based on Semantic Web Technology Article in the journal ERCIM. 2006
- Jadoul, R. and Mizohata, S. (2006). PRECODEM, an example of TAO in service of employment. Oral presentation at IADIS International Conference on Cognition and Exploratory Learning in Digital Age, CELDA 2006, 8–10 December 2006. Barcelona, Spain. Note for CELDA2006: Selected Papers will be published to a Special Issue of the Journal of Research on Technology in Education (ISSN 1539-1523) published by ISTE (International Society for Technology in Education).
- Plichart, P., Latour, T., Keller, U., Martin, R., Busana, G., Jadoul, R., Swietlik, J. (2006). TAO - An Open and Versatile Platform for Computer-Based Assessment. Poster presentation at 12th International Conference on Technology Supported Learning and Training, ONLINE EDUCA BERLIN 2006. November 29 - December 1, 2006, Berlin, Germany.
- Martin, R., Busana, G., Keller, U., Plichart, P., Latour, T., Jadoul, R., Swietlik, J. (2006). TAO - Presentation of Use Cases & Item Templates used in a Modular Platform for Computer-Based Assessment. Poster presentation at 12th International Conference on Technology Supported Learning and Training, ONLINE EDUCA BERLIN 2006. November 29 - December 1, 2006, Berlin, Germany.
- Jadoul, R., Plichart, P., Swietlik, J., Latour, T. (2006). eXULiS - a Rich Internet Application (RIA) framework used for eLearning and eTesting. Oral presentation at the IV International Conference On Multimedia And Information And Communication Technologies In Education, m-ICTE 2006. 22–25 November 2006. Seville, Spain In: Méndez-Vilas, A., Solano Martin, A., Mesa González, J., Mesa González, J.A. (eds.): Current Developments in Technology-Assisted Education (2006), Vol. 2. FORMATEX (http://www.formatex.org/micte2006/book2.htm), Badajoz, Spain, (2006) pp. 851–855
- Jadoul, R. Merche, J.F., Martin, R., Latour, T. (2006). CASCADE - a prospective formative testing tool. Poster presentation at the IV International Conference On Multimedia And Information And Communication Technologies In Education, m-ICTE 2006. 22–25 November 2006. Seville, Spain
- Jadoul, R. and Mizohata, S. (2006). PRECODEM, un exemple de TAO mis au service de l'emploi. Communication orale à ADMEE 2006. L'évaluation au 21e siècle. Vers de nouvelles formes, modélisations et pratiques de l'évaluation ? 19e Colloque International de l'ADMEE-Europe, 11-13 septembre 2006. Abbaye de Neumünster, Luxembourg.
- Plichart P., Latour Th., Martin R., Busana G., Vandenabeele L. (2006), TAO : A Modular and Versatile Platform for Collaborative and Distributed Computer-based Assessment Management : New features and use cases. Corporate demonstration in World Conference on Educational Multimedia, Hypermedia and Telecommunications – ED-MEDIA 2006, June 26–30, 2006. Orlando, Florida USA
- Busana, G., & Martin, R. (2005). Construction et évaluation de compétences en résolution de problèmes en mathématiques à l'aide de l'environnement informatisé CAMPUS, déployé par la plateforme TAO. Communication orale au 18e colloque international de l’Adméé-Europe : « Comment évaluer? Outils, dispositifs et acteurs » à l’IUFM de Reims, 24-26 octobre 2005, Reims, France.
- Martin, R., Latour, T., Burton, R., Busana, G., & Vandenabeele, L. (2005). Une plateforme collaborative et ouverte de testing assisté par ordinateur permettant l'élaboration et la passation d'instruments d'évaluation par voie d'Internet. Communication orale au 18e colloque international de l’Adméé-Europe : « Comment évaluer? Outils, dispositifs et acteurs » à l’IUFM de Reims, 24-26 octobre 2005, Reims, France.
- Busana, G., & Martin, R. (2005). CAMPUS: a generic framework for Computer Assisted Mathematical Problem Understanding and Solving. Communication de type poster à EDMEDIA 2005 World Conference on Educational Multimedia, Hypermedia & Telecommunications, 27 June - 2 July 2005. Montréal, Canada.
- Martin, R., Latour, T., Burton, R., Busana, G., & Vandenabeele, L. (2005). Covering Different Levels of Evaluation Needs by an Internet-Based Computer-Assisted Testing Framework for Collaborative Distributed Test Development and Delivery. Communication orale à EDMEDIA 2005 World Conference on Educational Multimedia, Hypermedia & Telecommunications, 27 June - 2 July 2005. Montréal, Canada.
- Latour, T., Martin, R., Burton, R., Busana, G., & Vandenabeele, L. (2005). TAO, a Modular and Versatile Platform for the Collaborative and Distributed Computer-based Assessment Management. Communication de type poster à EDMEDIA 2005 World Conference on Educational Multimedia, Hypermedia & Telecommunications, 27 June - 2 July 2005. Montréal, Canada.
- Martin, R., Latour, T., Burton, R., Busana, G., & Vandenabeele, L. (2005). TAO: Eine kollaborative Plattform für Internet-basiertes Testen. Paper presented at the Tagung der Sektion Empirische Bildungforschung der DGfE, 17.03 - 19.03. Berlin, Deutschland.
- Plichart P., Jadoul R., Vandenabeele L., Latour Th. (2004). TAO, A Collective Distributed Computer-Based Assessment Framework Built on Semantic Web Standards. In Proceedings of the International Conference on Advances in Intelligent Systems – Theory and Application AISTA2004, In cooperation with IEEE Computer Society, November 15–18, 2004. Luxembourg, Luxembourg.
- Martin, R., Busana, G., Latour T., & Vandenabeele, L. (2004). A distributed architecture for internet-based computer-assisted testing. Communication orale à EDMEDIA 2004. World Conference on Educational Multimedia, Hypermedia & Telecommunications at the University of Lugano, 21-26 juin 2004. Lugano, Suisse.

== Licence ==
The TAO platform is released under the GPLv2 licence.
