= QTI =

Specification for assessment contents and results representation

The IMS Question and Test Interoperability (QTI) specification defines a standard format for the representation of assessment content and results, supporting the exchange of this material between authoring and delivery systems, repositories and other learning and learning content management systems (LMS and LCMS, respectively). As reported by the Joint Information Systems Committee (JISC), an organisation that "supports UK post-16 and higher education and research by providing leadership" in uses of communications and information technologies "in support of learning, teaching, research and administration", the phrase "question and test interoperability (QTI)" is defined as a

Specification for tests and items which allows these to be authored and delivered on multiple systems interchangeably. It is designed to facilitate interoperability between systems.

The specification consists of a data model that defines the structure of questions, assessments and results from questions and assessments together with an XML data binding that essentially defines a language for interchanging questions and other assessment material. The XML binding is used for exchanging questions between different authoring tools and by publishers. The assessment and results parts of the specification are less widely used.

The standard is mainly implemented by commercial products; few open source assessment systems support it, and the most popular open source learning management systems limit support. (Moodle does not support it, and Canvas only supports the old 1.2 version.) The fact that you have to register to download the specs begs the openness of the standard.

== Background ==
QTI was produced by the IMS Global Learning Consortium (IMS GLC), which is an industry and academic consortium that develops specifications for interoperable learning technology. QTI was inspired by the need for interoperability in question design, and to avoid people losing or having to re-type questions when technology changes. Developing and validating good questions can be time consuming, and it is desirable to be able to create them in a platform and technology neutral format. As of this date, IMS has less than 800 members and is not the voice for the entire industry. You cannot use the QTI name in anything other than an RFP according to their website.

QTI version 1.0 was materially based on a proprietary Questions Markup Language (QML) language defined by QuestionMark, but the language has evolved over the years and can now describe almost any reasonable question that one might want to describe. (QML is still in use by Questionmark.)

Version 2.0 was finalized in 2005 and addressed the item (that is, the individual question) level of the specification only; a draft version of Version 2.1, which covered the structure of tests and results, was also released in 2005. Because Version 2.0 did not address test-level issues and was not compatible with Version 1, and because 2.1 was still under development, adoption of Version 2 was retarded. This was compounded in 2009 when IMS GLC withdrew the Version 2.1 draft and advised the user community that the only version "fully endorsed" by IMS GLC was 1.2.1, in effect also deprecating Version 2.0. Despite this, after several more drafts, 2.1 was finalized and released in 2012.

Version is 2.2, which was finalized in 2015, has subsequently had two minor revisions, 2.2.1 and 2.2.2, the latest of which was in November 2017. Version 2.2 updated and improved integration with W3C standards such as HTML5, SSML, PLS, CSS, ARIA, and MathML, and otherwise made relatively small changes to the Version 2.1 core specification.

Version 2.x is a significant improvement on Version 1, defining a new underlying interaction model. It is also notable for its significantly greater degree of integration with other specifications (some of which did not exist during the production of v1): the specification addresses the relationship with IMS Content Packaging v1.2, IEEE Learning Object Metadata, IMS Learning Design, IMS Simple Sequencing and other standards such as XHTML. It also provides guidance on representing context-specific usage data and information to support the migration of content from earlier versions of the specification. Version 3 is now available.

IMS is now called 1EdTech.

=== Certification ===
IMS offers certification of compliance to QTI standards, as noted in the table below. However, it is only offered to members of the consortium, and as of this date, costed US$ 1,000 to US$ 7,500 per year. There is also a cost to certify your software, in addition to the membership cost. This effectively leaves open source projects without the ability to be certified.

== Timeline ==
Date	Version	Comments; Refs.
March 1999	0.5	Internal to IMS.
February 2000	1.0 public draft	
May 2000	1.0 final release	
August 2000	1.01	
March 2001	1.1	
January 2002	1.2	
March 2003	1.2.1 addendum	
September 2003	2.0 charter	Initiation of working group.
January 2005	2.0 final release	
January 2006	2.1 public draft	
July 2006	2.1 public draft version 2	
March 2009	2.1 draft withdrawn, 2.0 deprecated	
September 2012	2.1 final release	
September 2015	2.2 final release	
November 2017	2.2.2 revision of 2.2	
May 2022	3.0 final release	

== Applications with IMS QTI support ==
Name	QTI version	Type of tool	Comment, Ref.	License	Certified
AssessmentQ	2.1	Intuitive web-based e-assessment platform, supporting authoring, delivery, grading, reporting, analytics and certification.	Supports import of QTI 2.1 files, PDF, XLIFF and Excel files.	Proprietary	No
ATutor	1.2, 2.1	LCMS	QTI 1.2; as of this date, QTI 2.1 export remains experimental. ATutor is no longer maintained.	GPL	No
Campfire Learning	2.1, 2.2	Curriculum and assessment management platform	Supports both import and export of QTI.	Proprietary	No
Canvas by Instructure	2.1	LMS	2.1, Import and export of QTI files, Support of authoring, item banking, and content delivery; since September 2023, New Quizzes supports exporting QTI 1.2.	AGPL	Yes
CSGrader	Not stated	Digital Education tool for creating programing assignments for schools, universities, and bootcamps	Does not support QTI.	Proprietary	No
Chamilo	1.2, 2.0	LMS/LCMS	Export QTI 1.2 & 2.0, import QTI 2.0 (1.2 disabled by default but available); supports SCORM 1.2.	GPL	No
Classera	2.2	Authoring		Proprietary	No
Cognero	1.2, 2.1	online assessment system providing online authoring, delivery, sharing, and reporting	Import and export QTI 1.2, export QTI 2.1.	Proprietary	Yes
Desire2Learn	1.2	LMS	Can export IMS QTI 1.2, an online tool provides QTI 1.2 import.	Proprietary	No
Examplary	2.1, 3.0	Test authoring tool with AI editing support.	Can export and import QTI 2.1 and 3.0 packages and Moodle XML.	Proprietary	No
FastTest	1.2, 1.2 (Pearson), 2.1	Single ecosystem for item authoring, form assembly, Angoff studies, online delivery, reporting, psychometric analysis, and computerized adaptive testing with item response theory	Supports both imports and exports.	Proprietary	No
GETMARKED	2.1, 1.2	Browser-based AI tool that automatically convert any docx or pdf quiz or exam into QTI. Does not require pdf or word document to conform to any specific format.	Supports exports to QTI 2.1, QTI 1.2, Blackboard Pool, Google Classroom and Moodle XML.	Proprietary	No
GradeMaker	2.1, 2.2	High stakes exam authoring tool for national Awarding Bodies and Higher Education with comprehensive workflow, versioning and auditing.	Supports exports to QTI file and publishing direct to test players.	Proprietary	No
ILIAS	Not stated	LMS	Supports SCORM 1.2 and SCORM 2004.	GPL	No
IMC	1.2	LMS	Supports both imports and exports.	Proprietary	No
Inspera Assessment	2.1, 2.2	Digital e-Assessment tool supporting authoring, delivering, marking and reporting, as well as providing learning analytics, computerized adaptive testing with item response theory.	Supports exporting and importing tests and items in QTI 2.1 and 2.2. The tests and items authored in Inspera's system are stored and conducted using QTI 2.2.	Proprietary	No
itslearning	2.1	LMS	Supports QTI import.	Proprietary	Yes
Learnosity	2.1	Suite of APIs, including assessment item rendering, assessment delivery, authoring and reporting tools	Supports both imports and exports.	Proprietary	No
Lectora	Not stated	Authoring tool	Supports AICC, SCORM 1.2 and SCORM 2004.	Proprietary	No
OpenOLAT	2.1	LMS / LCMS	Implementation based on QTI 2.1, import/export QTI 2.1 supported, 12 different question types.	Apache	No
Online Learning And Training	1.2	LCMS	QTI 2.1 compliance can be achieved with ONYX as plugin.	Apache	No
ONYX Testsuite	1.2, 2.1	Assessment suite, consists of authoring, delivery and reporting tool	Based on QTI 2.1, import/export QTI 1.2, import Blackboard/WebCT/OLAT.	Proprietary	Yes
ONYX WebEditor	1.2, 2.1	Online authoring tool (incl. converter and item-bank)	Based on QTI 2.1, import/export QTI 1.2, import Blackboard/WebCT/OLAT.	Proprietary	Yes
Remindo (by Paragin)	2.1	E-assessment and itembanking platform (incl. secure exam player) for constructing, delivering, grading and distributing exams, assessments and formative tests.	Based on QTI 2.1, import/export.	Proprietary	Yes
Quiz/Survey/Test (QST)	1/2/3	Complete Assessment Solution - Online and mobile, very scalable and secure. Question Bank, GradeBook, Free. Convert questions to different formats. Authoring, Delivery, Marking.	Import QTI 1/2/3 files, Export QTI 2.2, Import/Export Moodle XML. From a simple mobile quiz to full proctored desktop testing to detailed analysis.	GPL	No
QTImigration	1.0, 2.0	Converts QTI v1 to QTI v2		BSD	No
QTI-SDK	2.0, 2.1, 2.2	Software Development Kit aiming at providing tools to manipulate and deliver QTI assessments.	An IMS QTI Software Development Kit for PHP 7.4 and higher supporting a wide range of features described by the IMS QTI specification family.	GPL	No
QTIWorks	2.1	System for managing, verifying and delivering assessments	Development on system has ended.	BSD	No
QuestBase	Not stated	Authoring tool and delivery system	Free online tool that can import IMS QTI.	Proprietary	No
QuestionMark Perception	Not stated	Authoring tool and delivery system	Can export IMS QTI, an online tool provides QTI 1.2 import.	Proprietary	No
Question Writer 2.0 Publisher Edition	1.2	Authoring tool	Exports as QTI 1.2 and SCORM 1.2.	Proprietary	No
Question Writer 3.5 Professional	1.2	Authoring tool	Exports as QTI 1.2 and SCORM 1.2. Also specific QTI export for Pearson VUE.	Proprietary	No
Rogō	1.2	e-Assessment	Imports/exports QTI 1.2 format questions.	GPL	No
Sakai	1.2	LMS	Import and export QTI 1.2	ECL	No
SharePoint LMS	1.2	LMS	Can export IMS QTI 1.2, an online tool provides QTI 1.2 import.	Proprietary	No
TAO	2.1	Computer-based assessment platform	Package achieves four areas of compliance in single platform, "Content" (validity of the packages produced/ingested), "Authoring" (ability to author and export valid QTI Items & Tests), "Delivery" (ability to deliver QTI Items & Tests), "Item/Test Bank" (ability to store, import, export QTI items & tests).	GPL	Yes
Trifork—QTI Assessment Delivery Engine	2.2 & 3.0	Delivery System	QTI 2.2 & 3.0.	Proprietary	No
Trifork—QTI Editor	2.2 & 3.0	Authoring tool	QTI 2.2 & 3.0.	Proprietary	No

== See also ==
- GIFT (file format)
