= QML (disambiguation) =

QML is a user interface markup language, used with Qt Quick.

QML or qml may also refer to:

== Computing ==
- Questions Markup Language, a markup language, the predecessor of QTI (IMS Question and Test Interoperability specification)
- QML, a Haskell like functional quantum programming language
- Quantum machine learning, the integration of quantum algorithms within machine learning programs
- .qml, file extension for stylesheets for the QGIS geographic information system

== Other uses ==
- Queen Mary University of London
- Quake Movie Library, a collection of Machinima
- Quantified modal logic, a modal logic originally developed by Ruth Barcan Marcus
- Qualified Manufacturer List, term used by the United States Department of Defense
- ISO 639:qml, an ISO 639-3 language code
