= Xerte =

Open source software

Xerte is open source software for authoring learning objects. It is developed by the University of Nottingham in the UK and is free to download from the Xerte Community website.
