= NCTE =

NCTE may refer to:

- National Center for Transgender Equality, an American nonprofit social equality organization
- National Centre for Technology in Education, a 1988–2012 Irish government agency
- National College of Textile Engineering, now the National Textile University, in Faisalabad, Pakistan
- National Council for Teacher Education, an Indian regulatory body
- National Council of Teachers of English, an American professional association
