= Agrega =

Spanish digital repository

The Agrega project (Agrega is the Spanish word for "add") is a digital repository which is to be used by 19 educational authorities in Spain. Each educational authority will have its own repository of curricular learning objects created according to educational standards, and each single repository will be able to integrate and interoperate with other learning systems locally and worldwide.

== Objectives ==
The project's objectives are to:

- Promote, unify and establish a common cataloging, packaging and publishing standard of Spanish education community learning objects
- Create a technological reference framework where learning objects can be accessed under different models of utilization
- Generate a common procedure and establish practices to create digital learning objects from standards

== History ==
In order to create a sustainable learning federation, the project has the goal to:

- Generate a federation of interoperable Spanish educational repositories as opposed to a single central repository
- Promote openness for repository interoperability using known standards whenever possible. Agrega is based in digital repositories standards such as IMS DRI, SQI, RSS and OAI-PMH and digital objects standards as SCORM for object packaging and IMS SS for object sequencing and LOM-ES Spanish profile for metadata (which is based on Learning object metadata).
- Use standards and open source tools with an active and steadily growing community whenever possible. Agrega is being developed with open source tools.
- Develop a service-oriented architecture (SOA) and promote a technical architectural style with the goal of achieving loose coupling among heterogeneous interacting software agents.

The Agrega project has a focus on integration and interoperability between Agrega learning repositories and the rest of the world. Moreover, it is open to collaborative evolution based on a generic GPL licensing. It is the first step towards providing a nationwide access to content generated by the education community in a consistent and interoperable way.

Curricular content for Agrega is being developed under Creative Commons licensing schemes, can be experimented directly from a web site, offline or by an LMS, and all the contents and application will be localised in Spanish, Basque, Catalan, Valencian, Galician and English.

With this system, teachers and students will be able to search a repository of certified curricular content, access all the learning objects in the repository from a standard browser, and share content with other teachers and students. Teachers and the education community will be able to create new content in a consistent manner. They will also be able to compose, package, and reuse already existing content and publish certified curricular content.

== Partners ==
The partners of the Agrega project are Red.es (a public entrepreneurial entity attached to the Ministry of Industry), the Ministry of Industry, the Ministry of Education and the Spanish Autonomous Communities of Spain.
