= BigBlueButton =

Open source web conference system

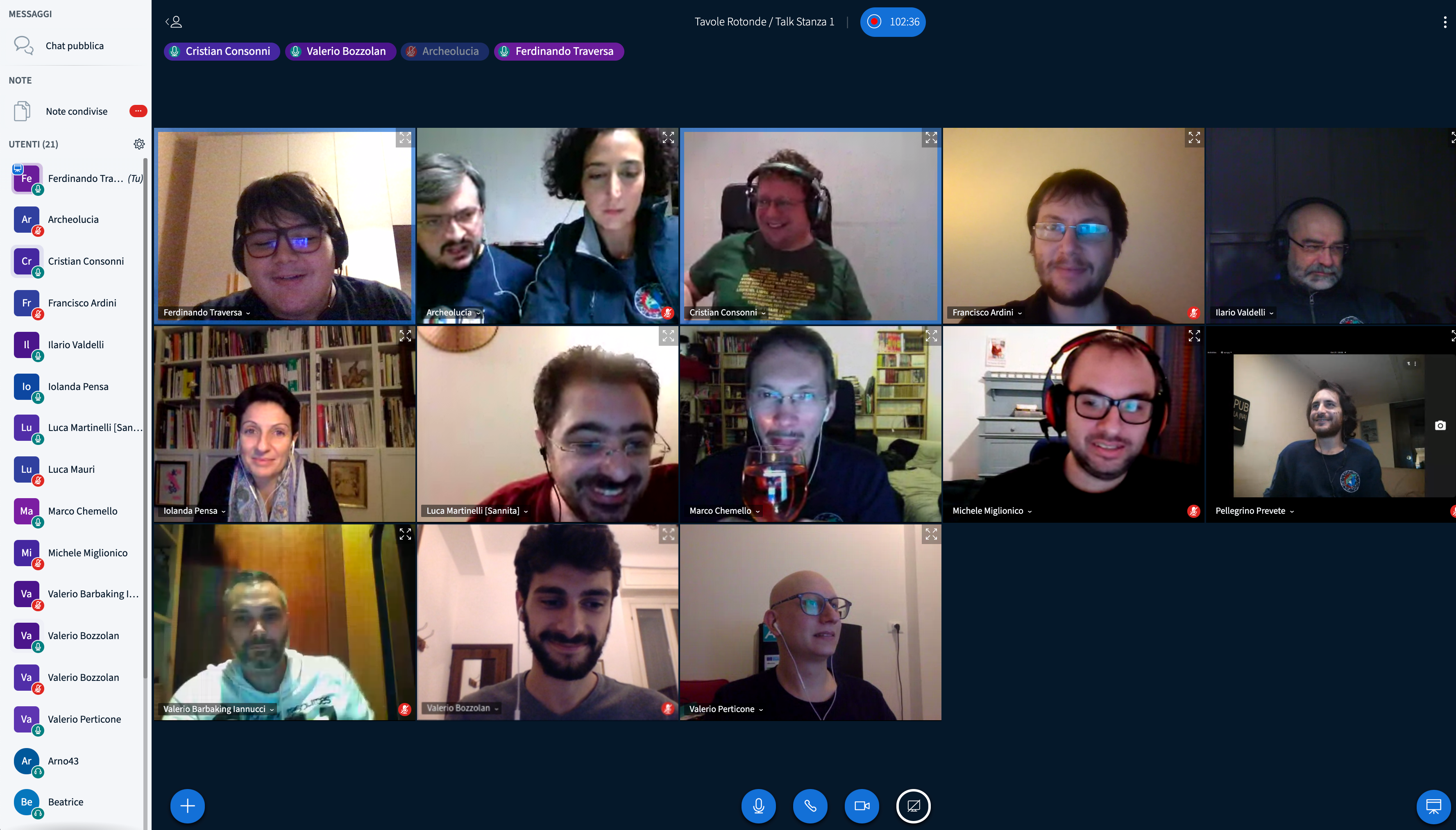
- Developer: BigBlueButton Inc.
- Stable release: 4.0.0 / 14 October 2026; 2 days ago
- Written in: Java, Grails/Groovy, Scala (back-end), JavaScript/React (web framework) (front-end client)
- Operating system: Linux
- Type: Collaborative software, Web conferencing
- License: LGPL
- Website: bigbluebutton.org
- Repository: github.com/bigbluebutton/bigbluebutton

BigBlueButton is a free and open-source virtual classroom software program designed for online education. It is primarily accessed through Learning Management Systems, providing engagement tools and analytics which enable educators to interact with their students remotely.

== History ==
The project was started at Carleton University in 2007 by the Technology Innovation Management program. The first version, initially referred to as the Blindside project, was written by Richard Alam under the supervision of Tony Bailetti. BigBlueButton is an affiliate member of the Open Source Initiative. The BigBlueButton name derives from the idea that starting a web conference should be as simple as "pressing a (metaphorical) big blue button".

In 2009, Richard Alam, Denis Zgonjanin, and Fred Dixon uploaded the BigBlueButton source code to Google Code and formed Blindside Networks, a company pursuing the traditional open source business model of providing paid support and services to the BigBlueButton community.

In 2010, the core developers added a whiteboard for annotating the uploaded presentation. Jeremy Thomerson added an application programming interface (API) which the BigBlueButton community subsequently used to integrate with Sakai, WordPress, Moodle 1.9, Moodle 2.0, Joomla, Redmine, Drupal, Tiki Wiki CMS Groupware, Foswiki, and LAMS. Google accepted BigBlueButton into the 2010 Google Summer of Code program. To encourage contributions from others, the core developers moved the source code from Google Code to GitHub. The project indicated its intent of creating an independent, not-for-profit BigBlueButton Foundation to oversee future development.

In 2011, the core developers announced that they were adding record and playback capabilities to BigBlueButton 0.80.

In 2020, the project released BigBlueButton 2.2, a full rewrite of the client and server to support HTML5.

In March 2020, BigBlueButton 2.2 was awarded by the President of the ENTD, Pasquale Aiello, as the best web conferencing system and used in the project UNIOPEN, approved by the European Commission for Digital Skills and Job Coalition action plan.

In 2021, version 2.3 was released. In 2022, BigBlueButton was directly embedded into the Moodle 4.0 core, the largest Learning Management System. It also released two new updates that included BigBlueButton 2.4 in January and BigBlueButton 2.5 in late September. BigBlueButton used a freely licensed version of MongoDB for version 2.2, but unintentionally picked up MongoDB's nonfree license change in 2.3. BigBlueButton worked to remove MongoDB and as of 3.0 no longer uses MongoDB.

In 2025, BigBlueButton 3.0 was released. BigBlueButton continues to be used by organizations including the Ministry of National Education (France), the Air Education and Training Command, not-for-profits such as School on Wheels, and schools throughout the world for remote learning and teaching.

| Version | Release date |
|---|---|
| 0.4 | 12 June 2009 |
| 0.5 | 21 July 2009 |
| 0.60 | 12 August 2009 |
| 0.70 | 15 July 2010 |
| 0.8-beta1 | 12 September 2011 |
| 0.90-beta | 15 October 2014 |
| 1.0-beta | 6 October 2015 |
| 1.1 | 25 May 2017 |
| 2.2 | 11 March 2020 |
| 2.3 | 30 April 2021 |
| 2.4 | 20 December 2021 |
| 2.5 | 9 June 2022 |
| 2.6 | 21 March 2023 |
| 2.7 | 7 September 2023 |
| 3.0.0 | February 28, 2025 |
| 3.0.32 | July 2, 2026 |
Unsupported Supported Latest version

== Architecture ==
As a web page application, the BigBlueButton frontend uses React and the backend uses MongoDB and Node.js. It also uses Redis to maintain an internal list of its meetings, attendees, and any other relevant information. As of version 2.5, the server runs on Ubuntu 20.04 64-bit and can be installed either from packages or an install script.

== Adoption among non-profits ==
In 2020, BigBlueButton was adopted by many FLOSS focused non-profits including Wikimedia Australia, Constant vzw and new FLOSS focused coops like Catalan's The Online Meeting Cooperative. In France it is recommended since May 2020 by the Digital Interministry Direction defining the state's information and communication systems.

== Third-party integrations ==
- Canvas (Learning management system)
- Chamilo (Learning management system)
- Drupal (Content management system)
- ILIAS (Learning management system)
- Moodle (Learning management system)
- Mattermost (Web-based chat service)
- Nextcloud (Open source cloud solution)
- OpenOLAT (Learning management system)
- Sakai Project (Learning management system)
- Tiki Wiki CMS Groupware (Content management system)
- Qwerteach (Saas/Tutoring platform)
- WordPress (Content management system)
- KampüsProject (Learning management system)
- CollaboratorLMS (Learning management system)
- Smartschool (Web-based school platform)

=== Formerly available integrations ===
- DoceboLMS (SaaS/cloud learning management system) As of 2024, Docebo appear to have removed their integration.

== See also ==
- Collaborative software
- Web conferencing
- Comparison of web conferencing software
