= GIFT (file format) =

Computer markup language

The GIFT (General Import Format Template) format is a "wiki-like" markup language for describing tests, originally proposed by Paul Shew in 2003. It is associated with the Moodle course management system.

== Question types in GIFT ==
GIFT allows someone to use a text editor to write multiple-choice, true-false, short answer, matching, missing word and numerical questions in a simple format that can be imported to a computer-based quizzes. The content is an UTF-8-encoded text file.

Example:

//Comment line 
::Question title 
:: Question {
     =A correct answer
     ~Wrong answer1
     #A response to wrong answer1
     ~Wrong answer2
     #A response to wrong answer2
     ~Wrong answer3
     #A response to wrong answer3
     ~Wrong answer4
     #A response to wrong answer4
}

== See also ==
- QTI
