= Chamilo =

Free educational software

- Developers: BeezNest and Chamilo community members
- Stable release: LMS 1.11.28 / 21 October 2024; 2 years ago
- Written in: PHP
- Operating system: Cross-platform
- Type: Course Management System
- License: GPLv3 or superior
- Website: chamilo.org
- Repository: github.com/chamilo/chamilo-lms

Chamilo is a free software (under GNU/GPL licensing) e-learning and content management system, aimed at improving access to education and knowledge globally. It is backed up by the Chamilo Association, which has goals including the promotion of the software, the maintenance of a clear communication channel and the building of a network of services providers and software contributors.

== History ==
The Chamilo project was officially launched on 18 January 2010 by a considerable part of the contributing community of the (also GNU/GPL) Dokeos software, after growing discontent on the communication policy inside the Dokeos community and a series of choices that were making parts of the community insecure about the future of developments. As such, it is considered a fork of Dokeos (at least in its 1.8 series). The reaction to the fork was immediate, with more than 500 active users registering on the Chamilo forums in the first fortnight and more contributions collected in one month than in the previous whole year.

The origins of Chamilo's code date back to 2000, with the start of the Claroline project, which was forked in 2004 to launch the Dokeos project. In 2010, it was forked again with the publication of Chamilo 1.8.6.2.

Chamilo used to come in two versions. The LMS (or "1.*") version directly builds on Dokeos. Chamilo LCMS (or 3.0) is a completely new software platform for e-learning and collaboration. However, due to frequent structural changes, the lack of migration workflow from LMS, the complexity of its interface and a certain lack of leadership, support for the project was abandoned by the association in 2015 to focus on improved LMS development.

== Community ==
Due to Chamilo's educational purpose, most of the community is related to the educational or the human resources sectors. The community itself works together to offer an easy-to-use e-learning system.

=== Active ===
Community members are considered active when they start contributing to the project (through documentation, forum contributions, development, design).

In 2009, members of the Dokeos community started working actively on the One Laptop Per Child project together with a primary school in Salto, Uruguay. One of the founding members of the Chamilo Association then registered as a contributing project for the OLPC in which his company would make efforts to ensure the portability of the platform to the XO laptop. The effort has been, since then, continued as part of the Chamilo project.

=== Passive ===
The community is considered passive when they use the software but do not contribute directly to it. As of February 2016, the passive community was estimated to be more than 11,000,000 users around the world.

== Chamilo Association ==
Since June 2010, the Chamilo Association has been a legally registered non-profit association (VZW) under Belgian law. The association was created to serve the general goal of improving the Chamilo project's organization and to avoid a conflict of interest between the organization controlling the software project decision process and the best interests of the community using the software. Its founding members, also its first board of directors, were originally 7, of which 3 are from the private e-learning sector and 4 were from the public educational sector. The current board of directors is composed of 5 members.

== Main features of Chamilo LMS ==
- courses, users and training cycles (including SOAP web services to manage remotely)
- social network for learning
- SCORM 1.2 compatibility and authoring tool
- LTI 1.1 support
- multi-institutions mode (with central management portal)
- time-controlled exams
- international characters (UTF-8)
- automated generation of certificates
- tracking of users progress
- competence based training (CBT) integrated with Mozilla Open Badges
- multiple time zones
- proven support for more than 700,000 users (single portal on a single server)

== Technical details ==
Chamilo is developed mainly in PHP and relies on a LAMP or WAMP system on the server side. On the client side, it only requires a modern web browser (versions younger than 3 years old) and optionally requires the Flash plugin to make use of advanced features.

== Interoperability ==
The Chamilo LMS (1.*) series benefits from third-party implementations that allows easy connexion to Joomla (through JFusion plugin), Drupal (through Drupal-Chamilo module), OpenID (secure authentication framework) and Oracle (through specific PowerBuilder implementations).

== Extensions ==
Chamilo offers a connector to videoconferencing systems (like BigBlueButton or OpenMeetings) as well as a presentations to learning paths converter, which require advanced system administration skills to install.

== Releases ==
You can get more information on releases from the original website. Chamilo LMS and Chamilo LCMS are two separate products of the Chamilo Association, which is why the releases history is split below.

=== Chamilo LMS ===
- 2024-10 - LMS v1.11.28: Maintenance version on top of 1.11.26.
- 2023-09 - LMS v1.11.26: Maintenance version on top of 1.11.24.
- 2023-08 - LMS v1.11.24: Maintenance version on top of 1.11.22.
- 2023-08 - LMS v1.11.22: Maintenance version on top of 1.11.20.
- 2023-06 - LMS v1.11.20: Maintenance version on top of 1.11.18.
- 2023-01 - LMS v1.11.18: Maintenance version on top of 1.11.16 introducing support for AI as a service to assist in the generation of questions, add support for wiki pages categories, attendance signatures and learner portfolio
- 2021-08 - LMS v1.11.16: Maintenance version on top of 1.11.14 introducing support for IMS/CC 1.3 and IMS/LTI provider mode
- 2020-11 - LMS v1.11.14: Maintenance version on top of 1.11.12 introducing xAPI compatibility
- 2020-08 - LMS v1.11.12: Maintenance version on top of 1.11.10
- 2019-05 - LMS v1.11.10: Maintenance version on top of 1.11.8
- 2018-08 - LMS v1.11.8: Maintenance version on top of 1.11.6, introducing GDPR features
- 2018-01 - LMS v1.11.6: Maintenance version on top of 1.11.4
- 2017-05 - LMS v1.11.4: Maintenance version for 1.11.2 introducing Google Maps connector to help communities of learners find close-by students, maintenance mode, SEPE standards integration, ODF online editor
- 2016-11 - LMS v1.11.2: Maintenance version for 1.11.0
- 2016-05 - LMS v1.11.0: This version introduces a basic course importer from Moodle, the management of skills levels, beta IMS/LTI support and the vChamilo plugin
- 2016-07 - LMS v1.10.8: Maintenance version for 1.10.6
- 2016-05 - LMS v1.10.6: Maintenance version for 1.10.4
- 2016-05 - LMS v1.9.10.4: Maintenance version for 1.9.10.2
- 2016-03 - LMS v1.10.4: Maintenance version for 1.10.2
- 2015-12 - LMS v1.10.2: Maintenance version for 1.10
- 2015-10 - LMS v1.10: First version to introduce OpenBadges and vCard features.
- 2015-01 - LMS v1.9.10: This version is a bugfix and minor-improvements release. It is the first version to comply with accessibility standard WAI WCAG Level AAA.
- 2014-06 - LMS v1.9.8: This version is a bugfix and minor-improvements release. First version to integrate a support tickets and a payment systems.
- 2014-04 - LMS v1.9.6.1: This version is a security-patch release.
- 2013-06 - LMS v1.9.6: This version is a bugfix and minor-improvements release.
- 2013-01 - LMS v1.9.4: This version is a bugfix and minor-improvements release.
- 2012-09 - LMS v1.9.2: This version of Chamilo comes with new features and improvements, including versatile mobile-friendly design features, question categories and the option to include voice recording in tests.
- 2012-08 - LMS v1.9.0: Chamilo LMS 1.9.0 is the first version of Chamilo (and arguably the first overall LMS platform) to fully support HTML5 (to the exception of a little mistake in the login field) and offer an adaptative HTML/CSS design. It adds a series of features like voice recording as a test answer, webcam capture, questions categories, videoconference recording and an improved plugins system to improve global and courses-specific features without touching the upstream Chamilo code. The same month of this release, Chamilo registered passed 1.2M users around the world.
- 2011-08 - v1.8.8.4: Although announced a bit later than its real release date, Chamilo 1.8.8.4 was released mostly as a fix version for 1.8.8.2. During the adoption period of this version, Chamilo reached 700,000 reported users. This version also considerably improved certificates generation.
- 2011-05 - v1.8.8.2: After a slightly flawed 1.8.8 not officially released, version 1.8.8.2 was released with new features like speech to text, online audio-recording, photo edition, SVG diagrams drawer, full-text indexing, certificates generation.
- 2010-07 - v1.8.7.1: Version 1.8.7.1, codename Palmas, was launched at the end of July 2010. It included security fixes to the wiki tool, many fixes to bugs found in 1.8.7 and a series of minor global improvements and new features.
- 2010-05 - v1.8.7: Version 1.8.7, codename Istanbul, was launched in May 2010 with major internationalization (language and time) improvements to the previous version, moving a first major step away from Dokeos. It also added new pedagogical tools to its previous version. This version was the first to be released officially as GNU/GPL version 3.
- 2010-01 - v1.8.6.2: Version 1.8.6.2 of Chamilo was originally meant to be released as Dokeos 1.8.6.2 in January 2010. Because of the community schism, it was left incomplete and continued (starting November 2009) as the Chamilo project.

=== Chamilo LCMS ===
- 2015: The LCMS project was discontinued (or continued outside the realm of the Chamilo Association)
- 2013-07 - LCMS v3.1: This version is a bugfix and minor-improvements release on top of LCMS v3.0.
- 2013-05 - LCMS v3.0: This version is refactores, v2.1 version of the LCMS software.
- 2012-01 - v2.1: Chamilo LCMS 2.1 is the first Chamilo 2 release that has extensively been tested in a variety of production environments. It can be considered to be stable. Chamilo 2 is user centred and repository based. All data reside in the repository, thus doing away with data duplication to a major extent. It includes a portfolio application and access from the user's repository to external repositories such as Google Docs, YouTube, Vimeo, Slideshare and many more.
- 2010-12 - v2.0: The first version 2.0 of Chamilo. Considered to be stable software with experimental web 2.0 and 3.0 aspects expected to analyze the impact of brand new technology on education. Apart from introducing the concept of true content, object and document management, Chamilo 2.0 also focuses on integration with existing repository systems (Fedora, YouTube, Google Docs, etc.) and supports some of the most popular authentication systems (ao. LDAP, CAS, Shibboleth). Its modular and dynamic architecture provides a basis for a multitude of extensions which can be added upon installation or at a later date by means of a repository of additional functionality packages.
- 2010-06 - v2.0 beta: Chamilo 2.0 beta is not considered production-safe (as its name implies) but implements a series of improvements to get to a more stable and usable release.
- 2010-06 - v2.0 alpha: Chamilo 2.0 was originally (first plans date back to 2006 in the Dokeos Users Day in Valence, France) meant to be released as Dokeos 2.0, as a completely new backend for the LMS. The complete team of developers working on this version decided, in 2009, to move to the Chamilo project, thus leaving the Dokeos project repository with incomplete sources. Although Dokeos promised since then to release version 2.0 on 10 October 2010 (with a corresponding counter counting down from more than 200 days before that), it is not the total remake it was supposed to be, and it is actually expected to be equivalent in features to 1.8.6.1, mostly adding valuable visual and usability improvements.

== Statistics ==
The free-to-use Chamilo campus registered 100,000 users in October 2011 (15 months after its launch), for 38,000 users in December 2010 (11 months after its launch). The Peruvian private Universidad San Ignacio de Loyola reported 1,700 users connected in the same 120 seconds time frame in August 2011. Globally, Chamilo registered 700,000 users in October 2011, more than 5,000,000 users in June 2013 and more than 20,000,000 users in August 2018.

== Worldwide adoption ==
- Chamilo is backed up by a series of small to medium companies and universities, which are required to register as members of the association and contribute to the open source software to be recognized as official providers. One of the prerequisites to become a member is to show an understanding of the concept of free software for the benefit of worldwide education. One of the prerequisites to become an official provider is to contribute something to the community.
- Chamilo is also used in public administrations, Spanish, Belgian, Dutch and Peruvian ministries, as well as unemployment services and NGO's.
- Over the years, the cumulative number of organisations using Chamilo freely worldwide grew as follows.

Institutional adoption
Year	Number of installations
2012	2,000
2014	11,000
2016	31,000
2019	53,000
2022	82,000

== Coverage ==
- In 2012, Chamilo appears in the FOSS Weekly podcast to discuss the founding principles of the project. Chamilo later receives funding from the Linux Foundation to translate Chamilo to Tagalog.
- In 2018, Chamilo is included in EPALE, the Electronic Platform for Adult Learning in Europe.
- In 2020, the Belgian news channel RTL interviews Yannick Warnier (in French) regarding the project as the COVID-19 crisis impacts education.
- In 2020, Chamilo is added to the French Inter-ministry Free Software Catalog.

== See also ==
- Learning management system
- Online learning community
