= Learnosity =

Irish-based education technology company

- Type: Private
- Industry: Education Technology
- Founded: 2007
- Headquarters: Dublin, Ireland
- Key people: Gavin Cooney (Founder & CEO); Mark Lynch (Founder & CTO)
- Services: Assessment software
- Website: www.learnosity.com

Learnosity is an Irish education technology company. It produces assessment software used by educational organizations and test publishers. The company is headquartered in Dublin.

== History ==
Learnosity was founded in Dublin, Ireland in 2007 by CEO Gavin Cooney and CTO Mark Lynch. The company creates online education assessment and teaching software. It initially created software for audio assessment and mobile-assisted language learning, notably for the FÓN project – a joint collaboration between The National Council for Curriculum and Assessment (NCCA) and the National Centre for Technology in Education (NCTE).

In 2016, 3P Learning acquired a 40% stake in the company. 3P Learning sold its stake in Learnosity to Battery Ventures in 2018. At the time, it was valued at €30 million.

In 2021, Learnosity acquired the British assessment software company Questionmark.

In 2025, Learnosity was acquired by Leeds Equity Partners.
