= Pasquale Aiello =

Italian scientist (born 1976)

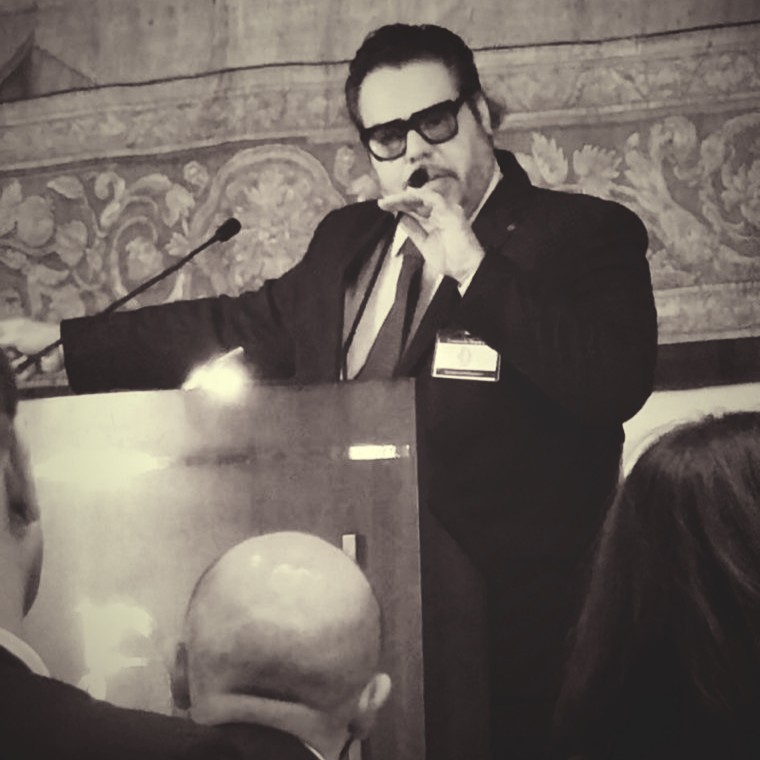
- Born: 5 December 1976 (age 49); Naples, Italy
- Education: University of Harvard
- Occupations: Research scientist, data scientist, digital humanist, top manager
- Known for: Founding National Authority for Digital Transformation; Founding Ethical Trendsetting Global Organization; Author of the first book of digital humanism "Ethical Unlockdown AnnoX - FaseZero".; Scientific Commissioner for the Italian Ministry of University and Research
- Website: www.researchgate.net/profile/Pasquale-Aiello

Pasquale Aiello (born 5 December 1976) is an Italian research scientist. He is an ethical researcher of socio-cultural and geo-political changes during the Industrial Revolution. He works via mathematical models and neuroscience.

== Career ==
In 2018 he gave life to a current of thought and action guided by ethics and specialization, ethical trendsetting. He promotes the power of ethical polarization. In 2020 he founded National Authority for Digital Transformation (ENTD - Ente Nazionale per la Trasformazione Digitale), the first non-governmental body specialized in research and development with a focus on innovative governance systems based on the aggregating principles of communities.

He is an activist in Digital humanities and business ethics specialized in digital intelligence, emotional intelligence and multiple intelligences. He is active in politics as a representative of interests at the Chamber of Deputies.

Aiello is Scientific Commissioner for the Italian Ministry of University and Research and supports the European Commission with publications, research and studies on unconventional and innovative methodologies at the application and vision level as Policy maker. He is considered the father of the Digital Intelligence Matrix, a model that starts from the ability/propensity/willingness to learn attitudes in relation to the typing of subjects with collaborative and/or competitive behaviors.

He is President of the National Body for Digital Transformation.

In November 2021 he was included among the world's 10 most influential thought leaders.

== Advisor ==
- Harvard Business Review, Member of the International HBR Advisory Council
