= H5P =

Free and open-source content collaboration framework

- Developer: H5P Team
- Initial release: January 25, 2013; 12 years ago
- Operating system: Cross-platform
- Platform: PHP, JavaScript
- Type: Content Collaboration Framework
- License: MIT+
- Website: h5p.org

H5P is a free and open-source content collaboration framework based on JavaScript. H5P is an abbreviation for HTML5 Package, and aims to make it easy for everyone to create, share and reuse interactive HTML5 content. Interactive videos, interactive presentations, quizzes, interactive timelines and more have been developed and shared using H5P on H5P.org. H5P is being used by 17 000+ websites. In June 2018 the core team announced that H5P would be supported financially by the Mozilla Foundation within the MOSS program. Results were presented roughly one year later.

The framework consists of a web based content editor, a website for sharing content types, plugins for existing content management systems and a file format for bundling together HTML5 resources.

The web based editor is by default able to add and replace multimedia files and textual content in all kinds of H5P content types and applications. In addition a content type may provide custom widgets for the editor enabling any kind of editing capabilities and experiences including WYSIWYG editing of the entire content type.

H5P.org is the community website where H5P libraries, applications and content types may be shared. H5P applications and content types work the same way in all H5P compatible websites.

Currently four platform integrations exist, one for Drupal, WordPress., Tiki, and one for Moodle. The platform integrations include the generic H5P code as well as interface implementations and platform specific code needed to integrate H5P with the platforms. H5P has been designed to have a minimum of platform specific code and a minimum of backend code. Most of the code is JavaScript. The aim is to make it easy to integrate H5P with new platforms.

The file format consists of a metadata file in JSON format, a number of library files providing features and design for the content and a content folder where textual content is stored in JSON format and multimedia is stored as files or links to files on external sites.

H5P created an OER Hub after the announcement at the H5P Conference in 2020.

In 2024, H5P Group was acquired by D2L, a Canada-based learning technology company.

== Most innovative examples of H5P ==
- Branching Scenario enabling creators to set up scenario-based learning opportunities;
- AR scavenger which allows users use Augmented reality without installing special software;
- Cornell Notes where students can follow the Cornell method to directly attach their notes and ideas to a text, a video or an audio file and retrieve their documentation later on; and
- Image Choice where one can create a task where the alternatives are images.

== Support ==
H5P's primary support website is H5P.org. Here, H5P may be tried out; it hosts the online manual for H5P and a living repository for H5P information, documentation and forums.
