= OLAT =

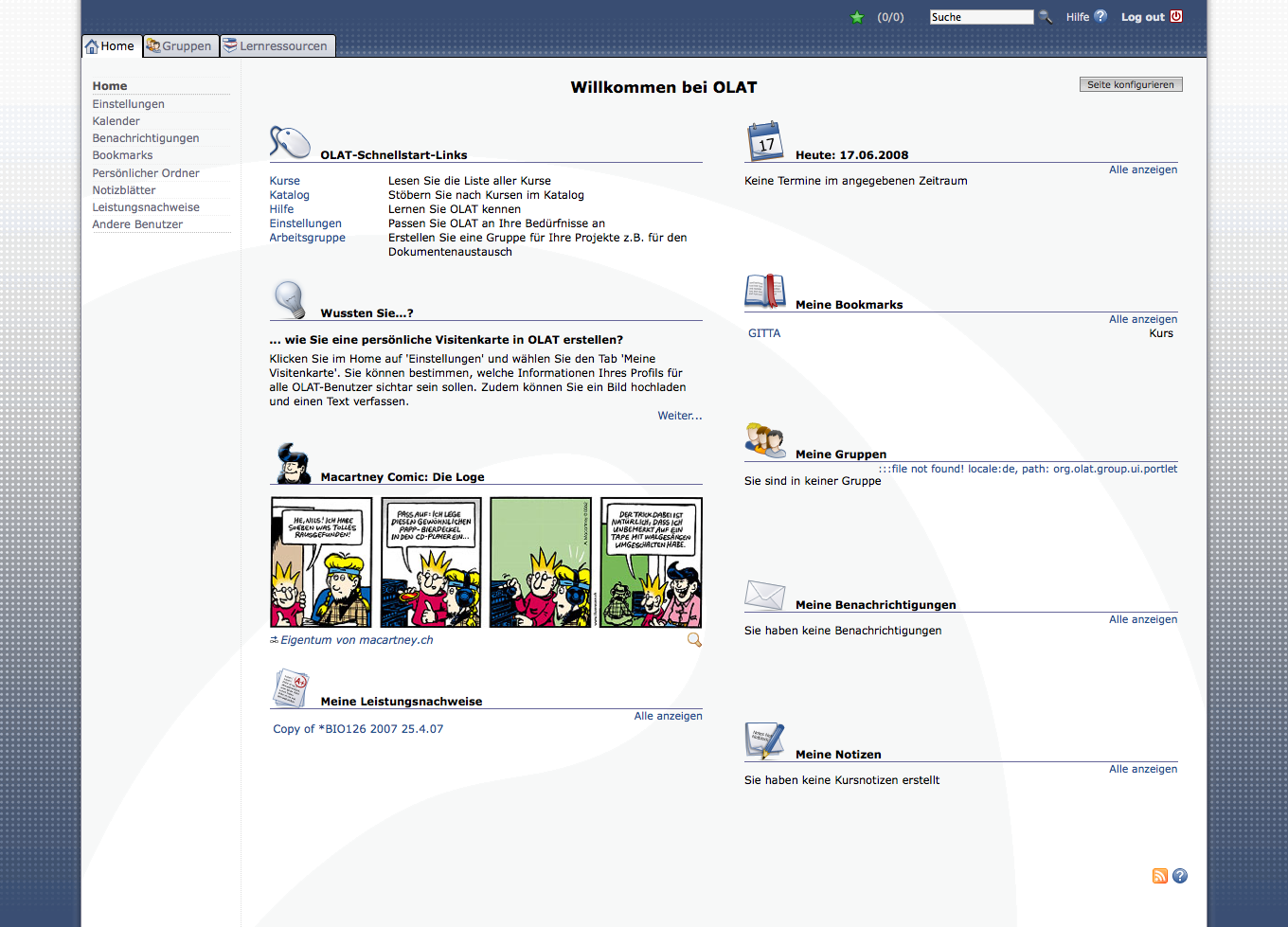
- Open Source Learning Management System
- Developer: University of Zurich in association with the community
- Stable release: 7.6 / September 17, 2012
- Repository: hg.olat.org/repos
- Written in: Java
- Operating system: Cross-platform (based on Java)
- Type: LMS (Learning Management System)
- License: Apache License 2.0
- Website: www.olat.org

OLAT is an acronym for Online Learning And Training. It is a web application – a Learning Management System that supports different kinds of online learning, teaching, and tutoring with few educational restrictions. OLAT is free software and is open-source. Its development started in 1999 at the University of Zürich and OLAT won the MeDiDa-Prix prize in 2000. With version 3.0, the system was rebuilt and is now available as a component-oriented application developed in the Java programming language. OLAT has support for various E-learning standards such as IMS (IMS Content Packaging, IMS QTI), and SCORM. With version 4.0, many add-ons have been introduced to the system, which makes it very easy to extend the LMS functionality. With version 5.0, new features like Wiki, Calendar, AJAX Beta Mode, and Fulltext Search have been implemented. Version 6.0 comprised a new and improved layout based on a usability evaluation. A subsequent version provides full scalability, meaning OLAT can be run on a cluster of servers. OLAT 7.0 adds new features, a course wizard plus the implementation of important standards like REST API, IMS Basic LTI and IMS QTI 2.1. In autumn 2011 some of the core community contributors left the OLAT community because of strategic differences and started an alternative fork which is named OpenOLAT.

== Features ==
OLAT has many features typical for e-learning platforms:

- Content managing
- Forums
- File discussions
- Quizzes with different kinds of questions
- Wikis
- Blogs
- Podcast
- Surveys
- Chat
- Submission module (for exercises)
- Grading module
- Time marker for video data
- Scalability: OLAT can be run as a cluster
- Multi-language support (OLAT is multilingual and available in many languages; full support for UTF-8)
- OLAT integrates the instant messaging system XMPP to support the synchronous communication processes and to extend the users' awareness.

== Current status and future development ==
As the strategic LMS of the University of Zürich, OLAT is continuously being developed. In the meantime, OLAT gains attention, especially within the European higher education market. OLAT and the Sakai Project have similar goals, but compared to the American initiative, OLAT has a much longer development phase and has been successfully in production for several years. OLAT has been developed from the beginning to support campus-wide E-learning and can be compared to commercial tools like WebCT Vista.

OLAT is a mature LMS, used to support universities with thousands of users, e.g. University of Zurich with approx. 50,000, Bildungsportal Sachsen (under the name of OPAL) with approx. 40,000, University of Hamburg with approx. 30,000 and, as of the summer semester 2011, Goethe University Frankfurt with approx. 50,000 users.

By the end of 2011 the OpenOLAT fork has been started as an alternative development line by the largest community contributor who by this initiative left the original OLAT community due to strategic differences. The common base of OLAT and OpenOLAT is the 7.1 release. From that point the two systems are heading into different directions. The first OpenOLAT release was published in February 2012 with the number 8.0.

== Recognitions ==
- OLAT won the MedidaPrix 2000, which is the most important e-learning award in the German language area (Austria, Germany, and Switzerland).
- OLAT won the Swiss Open Source Award 2008.
- OLAT won in 2009 the IMS Learning Impact 'Leadership Award' 2009 for OLAT for best open source learning platform.

== Specification ==
OLAT runs without modification on Unix, Linux, OpenBSD, FreeBSD, Windows, and Mac OS X.

The requirements for OLAT are:

- Java SDK
- Tomcat Servlet Engine
- Database such as MySQL or PostgreSQL
- Ant for developers and installing from source

The project was initiated in 1999 but later rebuilt using Java and released as open source in 2004.

== See also ==
- Learning management system
