= Bernd Krämer =

German computer scientist and professor

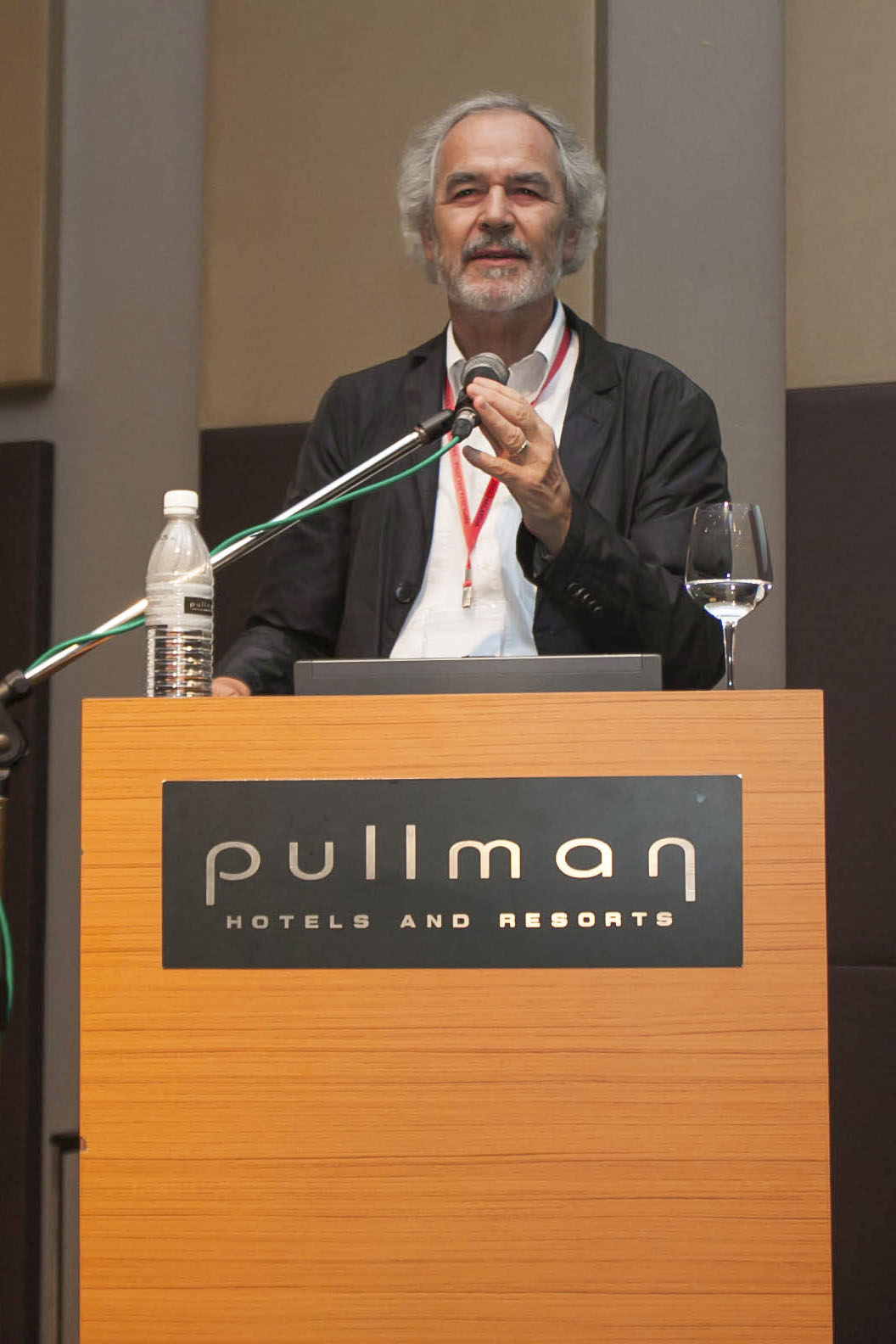
Bernd Krämer in 2014.

Bernd Johann Krämer (born 22 July 1947, in Berlin) is a German computer scientist and professor emeritus of the Faculty of Mathematics and Informatics.

== Biography ==
Bernd Krämer studied electrical engineering and computer science at Technische Universität Berlin where he also obtained his doctorate in engineering. From 1975 to 1989 and again from 1990 to 1992 he was a scientist and project leader at the Gesellschaft für Mathematik und Datenverarbeitung, the German National Research Center of Computer Science, which later became part of the Fraunhofer Society. From 1989 to mid 1990 he was an adjunct professor in the Computer Science department at the Naval Postgraduate School in Monterey, California. In April 1992 he was appointed full professor at FernUniversität in Hagen. He is a co-founder, past president, fellow, and Board Member of the Society for Design & Process Science (SDPS). From 2008 to 2013 he was a member of the first University Council of FernUniversität in Hagen. He has been a visiting professor at a number of prestigious international universities, including the Queensland University of Technology, in Brisbane and Monash University in Melbourne, both in Australia, McGill University in Montreal, the University of California, Berkeley and Shanghai Jiao Tong University.

He is a co-founder of two non-profit research associations, the Scientific Academy for Service Technology and edu-sharing.net. ServTech conducts EU-funded research projects in the areas ofSmart Manufacturing, Product Customization, and Smart Healthcare and is the main sponsor of the annual International Conference on Service Oriented Computing (ICSOC). Since mid-2009, the association edu-sharing.net has been developing one of the first distributed repositories for digital learning content, which was developed by the DFG-funded project CampusContent, under the new name edu-sharing. It forms the basis of several repositories for Open Educational Resources and has been rolled out in several German states as an infrastructure for networking schools to provide them with broad access to digital learning materials and codified methodological knowledge through a single portal and to enable the exchange and joint development of such content.

Krämer co-founded the open access journal e-learning and education and was its first editor-in-chief.

He received the C. V. Ramamoorthy Distinguished Scholar Award In 2003 and the Raymond T. Yeh Life Time Achievement Award in 2006, both from the SDPS.

== Selected books ==
- Software Service and Application Engineering - Festschrift Dedicated to Bernd Krämer on the Occasion of His 65th Birthday, Lecture Notes in Computer Science
- Advances in Collective Intelligence (Advances in Intelligent and Soft Computing, Vol. 113) by Jörn Altmann, Ulrike Baumöl, Bernd Krämer (2012)
- On Collective Intelligence (Advances in Intelligent and Soft Computing, Vol. 76) by Theo J. Bastiaens, Ulrike Baumöl, Bernd Krämer (2011)
- Contributions to Ubiquitous Computing (Studies in Computational Intelligence, Volume 42) by Bernd Krämer, Wolfgang Halang (2007)
- Service-Oriented Computing - ICSOC 2007 (Lecture Notes in Computer Science, Vol. 4907) by Bernd Krämer, Kwei-Jay Lin, Priya Narasimhan (2007)
- Third International Symposium on Software Engineering for Parallel and Distributed Systems (IEEE Computer Society Press) by Mike P. Papazoglou, Makoto Takizawa, Bernd J. Krämer, Samuel Chanson (1998)
- Information Systems Interoperability (Research Studies Press) by Bernd J. Krämer, Mike P. Papazoglou, Heinz W. Schmidt (1998)
- Safety-Critical Real-Time Systems (Kluwer Academic Publishers) by Bernd J. Krämer, Norbert Völker (1997)
- 2nd IEEE International Conference on Engineering of Complex Computer Systems (IEEE Computer Society Press) by Rick Hohendorf, Yoshiaki Kakuda, Bernd J. Krämer, Kelvin Nilsen, Kevin Ryan (1996)
- Environmental Engineering and Pollution Prevention: European Network of Excellence and Partnership (Kluwer Academic Publishers) by Joris Wotte, Wolfgang A. Halang, Bernd J. Krämer (1996)
- A Safety Licensable Computing Architecture (World Scientific Publishing) by Wolfgang A. Halang, S. K. Jung, Bernd J. Krämer, Johan J. Scheepstra (1993)
- Concepts, Syntax and Semantics of SEGRAS. A Specification Language for Distributed Systems(Oldenbourg) by Bernd J. Krämer (1989)

== Selected academic works ==
- 2018, Collaborative on-demand Product-Service Systems Customization Lifecycle
- 2017, Knowledge Management through Ontology-Driven Integration of Disparate Knowledge Sources, Transactions of the SDPS
- 2015, New ways of learning: Comparing the effectiveness of interactive online media in distance education with the European textbook tradition
- 2010, From content to practice: Sharing educational practice in edu-sharing
