= National Centre for Technology in Education =

National Centre for Technology in Education (NCTE)
Agency overview
- Formed: 1988; 38 years ago
- Dissolved: 2012; 14 years ago
- Superseding agency: PDST Technology in Education
- Jurisdiction: Ireland

The National Centre for Technology in Education (NCTE) was an Irish government agency established in 1988 to facilitate the development, funding and use of information and communications technologies in education in Ireland. It also developed software for school computers which blocked websites deemed unsuitable for children or potentially harmful to a computer.

In 2012, the National Centre for Technology in Education was made defunct and its functions integrated into the Irish government's Professional Development Service for Teachers (PDST) as "PDST Technology in Education".
