= Apache OpenMeetings =

OpenMeetings
- Developers: Maxim Solodovnik, Sebastian Wagner, community
- Stable release: 9.1.0 / July 14, 2026; 37 days ago
- Operating system: Mac OS X, Microsoft Windows, Solaris, Red Hat Enterprise Linux, Novell SUSE Linux, Ubuntu
- Type: Collaborative workspace, Web conferencing
- License: Apache License 2.0
- Website: openmeetings.apache.org
- Repository: OpenMeetings Repository

OpenMeetings is software used for presenting, online training, web conferencing, collaborative whiteboard drawing and document editing, and user desktop sharing. The product is based on Red5 media server, HTML5 and Flash which in turn are based on a number of open source components. Communication takes place in virtual "meeting rooms" which may be set to different communication, security and video quality modes. The recommended database engine for backend support is MySQL. The product can be set up as an installed server product, or used as a hosted service.

Work on OpenMeetings started in 2007 by Sebastian Wagner. Since 2009 the project became open which helped to involve other developers from different countries. Starting from 2011 main project development and technical support moved to Russia. In the meantime, web conferencing services based on OpenMeetings formally are offered by about a dozen companies around the world. Since 2012, the project is being developed under the auspices of open-source devoted Apache Software Foundation (ASF) and possesses Apache License, which allows it to be used in commercial projects. Since 2012 OpenMeetings progress is presented regularly at the ApacheCon.

Public facilities include the educational intranet "Koblenzer Schulnetz" in Koblenz, Germany and two public demo-servers.

Articles have been published at ZDNet Blogs and a publication in LinuxMag France Page 40-44 and Ajax Magazine.

OpenMeetings is used for web conferencing in FOSS e-learning solutions Moodle and Atutor. Now OpenMeetings is integrated with several CMS, CRM and other systems. The project has been downloaded over 250 000 times. OpenMeetings is available in 31 languages.

== Features ==
Open Meetings implements the following features:

- Audio communication
- Video conferencing
- Meeting recording
- Screen sharing
- Collaborative document editing
- Chat and white boarding
- User and room management
- Mobile client for Android
- No encryption protocol, end to end etc

== See also ==
- Comparison of web conferencing software
