= Learning object metadata =

Data model

A schematic representation of the hierarchy of elements in the LOM data model

Learning Object Metadata is a data model, usually encoded in XML, used to describe a learning object and similar digital resources used to support learning. The purpose of learning object metadata is to support the reusability of learning objects, to aid discoverability, and to facilitate their interoperability, usually in the context of online learning management systems (LMS).

The IEEE 1484.12.1-2020 – Standard for Learning Object Metadata is the latest revision of an internationally recognised open standard (published by the Institute of Electrical and Electronics Engineers Standards Association, New York) under the LTSC sponsorship for the description of “learning objects". Relevant attributes of learning objects to be described include: type of object; author; owner; terms of distribution; format; and pedagogical attributes, such as teaching or interaction style.

== IEEE 1484.12.1 – 2002 Standard for Learning Object Metadata ==
The IEEE working group that developed the standard defined learning objects, for the purposes of the standard, as being "any entity, digital or non-digital, that may be used for learning, education or training." This definition has struck many commentators as being rather broad in its scope, but the definition was intended to provide a broad class of objects to which LOM metadata might usefully be associated rather than to give an instructional or pedagogic definition of a learning object. IEEE 1484.12.1 is the first part of a multipart standard, and describes the LOM data model. The LOM data model specifies which aspects of a learning object should be described and what vocabularies may be used for these descriptions; it also defines how this data model can be amended by additions or constraints. Other parts of the standard are being drafted to define bindings of the LOM data model, i.e. define how LOM records should be represented in XML and RDF (IEEE 1484.12.3 and IEEE 1484.12.4 respectively). This article focuses on the LOM data model rather than issues relating to XML or other bindings.

IMS Global Learning Consortium is an international consortium that contributed to the drafting of the IEEE Learning Object Metadata (together with the ARIADNE Foundation) and endorsed early drafts of the data model as part of the IMS Learning Resource Meta-data specification (IMS LRM, versions 1.0 – 1.2.2). Feedback and suggestions from the implementers of IMS LRM fed into the further development of the LOM, resulting in some drift between version 1.2 of the IMS LRM specification and what was finally published at the LOM standard. Version 1.3 of the IMS LRM specification realigns the IMS LRM data model with the IEEE LOM data model and specifies that the IEEE XML binding should be used. Thus, we can now use the term 'LOM' in referring to both the IEEE standard and version 1.3 of the IMS specification. The IMS LRM specification also provides an extensive Best Practice and Implementation Guide, and an XSL transform that can be used to migrate metadata instances from the older versions of the IMS LRM XML binding to the IEEE LOM XML binding.

== Technical details ==
=== How the data model works ===
The LOM comprises a hierarchy of elements. At the first level, there are nine categories, each of which contains sub-elements; these sub-elements may be simple elements that hold data, or may themselves be aggregate elements, which contain further sub-elements. The semantics of an element are determined by its context: they are affected by the parent or container element in the hierarchy and by other elements in the same container. For example, the various Description elements (1.4, 5.10, 6.3, 7.2.2, 8.3 and 9.3) each derive their context from their parent element. In addition, description element 9.3 also takes its context from the value of element 9.1 Purpose in the same instance of Classification.

The data model specifies that some elements may be repeated either individually or as a group; for example, although the elements 9.2 (Description) and 9.1 (Purpose) can only occur once within each instance of the Classification container element, the Classification element may be repeated - thus allowing many descriptions for different purposes.

The data model also specifies the value space and datatype for each of the simple data elements. The value space defines the restrictions, if any, on the data that can be entered for that element. For many elements, the value space allows any string of Unicode character to be entered, whereas other elements entries must be drawn from a declared list (i.e. a controlled vocabulary) or must be in a specified format (e.g. date and language codes). Some element datatypes simply allow a string of characters to be entered, and others comprise two parts, as described below:

- LangString items contain Language and String parts, allowing the same information to be recorded in multiple languages
- Vocabulary items are constrained in such a way that their entries have to be chosen from a controlled list of terms - composed of Source-Value pairs - with the Source containing the name of the list of terms being used and the Value containing the chosen term
- DateTime and Duration items contain one part that allows the date or duration to be given in a machine readable format, and a second that allows a description of the date or duration (for example "mid summer, 1968").

When implementing the LOM as a data or service provider, it is not necessary to support all the elements in the data model, nor need the LOM data model limit the information which may be provided. The creation of an application profile allows a community of users to specify which elements and vocabularies they will use. Elements from the LOM may be dropped and elements from other metadata schemas may be brought in; likewise, the vocabularies in the LOM may be supplemented with values appropriate to that community.

=== Requirements ===
The key requirements for exploiting the LOM as a data or service provider are to:

- Understand user/community needs and to express these as an application profile
- Have a strategy for creating high quality metadata
- Store this metadata in a form which can be exported as LOM records
- Agree a binding for LOM instances when they are exchanged
- Be able to exchange records with other systems either as single instances or en masse.

=== Related specifications ===
There are many metadata specifications; of particular interest is the Dublin Core Metadata Element Set (commonly known as Simple Dublin Core, standardised as ANSI/NISO Z39.85 – 2001). Simple Dublin Core (DC) provides a non-complex, loosely defined set of elements which is useful for sharing metadata across a wide range of disparate services. Since the LOM standard used Dublin Core as a starting point, refining the Simple DC schema with qualifiers relevant to learning objects, there is some overlap between the LOM and DC standards. The Dublin Core Metadata Initiative is also working on a set of terms which allow the Dublin Core Element Set to be used with greater semantic precision (Qualified Dublin Core). The Dublin Education Working Group aims to provide refinements of Dublin Core for the specific needs of the education community.

Many other education-related specifications allow for LO metadata to be embedded within XML instances, such as: describing the resources in an IMS Content Package or Resource List; describing the vocabularies and terms in an IMS VDEX (Vocabulary Definition and Exchange) file; and describing the question items in an IMS QTI (Question and Test Interoperability) file.

The IMS Vocabulary Definition and Exchange (VDEX) specification has a double relation with the LOM, since not only can the LOM provide metadata on the vocabularies in a VDEX instance, but VDEX can be used to describe the controlled vocabularies which are the value space for many LOM elements.

LOM records can be transported between systems using a variety of protocols, perhaps the most widely used being OAI-PMH.

=== Application profiles ===
==== UK LOM Core ====
For UK Further and Higher Education, the most relevant family of application profiles are those based around the UK LOM Core. The UK LOM Core is currently a draft schema researched by a community of practitioners to identify common UK practice in learning object content, by comparing 12 metadata schemas. UK LOM is currently legacy work, it is not in active development.

==== CanCore ====
CanCore provides detailed guidance for the interpretation and implementation of each data element in the LOM standard. These guidelines (2004) constitute a 250-page document, and have been developed over three years under the leadership of Norm Friesen, and through consultation with experts across Canada and throughout the world. These guidelines are also available at no charge from the CanCore Website.

==== ANZ-LOM ====
ANZ-LOM is a metadata profile developed for the education sector in Australia and New Zealand. The profile sets obligations for elements and illustrates how to apply controlled vocabularies, including example regional vocabularies used in the "classification" element. The ANZ-LOM profile was first published by The Le@rning Federation (TLF) in January, 2008.

==== Vetadata ====
The Australian Vocational Training and Education (VET) sector uses an application profile of the IEEE LOM called Vetadata. The profile contains five mandatory elements, and makes use of a number of vocabularies specific to the Australian VET sector. This application profile was first published in 2005. The Vetadata and ANZ-LOM profiles are closely aligned.

==== NORLOM ====
NORLOM is the Norwegian LOM profile. The profile is managed by NSSL (The Norwegian Secretariat for Standardization of Learning Technologies)

==== ISRACore ====
ISRACORE is the Israeli LOM profile. The Israel Internet Association (ISOC-IL) and Inter University Computational Center (IUCC) have teamed up to manage and establish an e-learning objects database.

==== SWE-LOM ====
SWE-LOM is the Swedish LOM profile that is managed by IML at Umeå University as a part of the work with the national standardization group TK450 at Swedish Standards Institute.

==== TWLOM ====
TWLOM is the Taiwanese LOM profile that is managed by Industrial Development and Promotion of Archives and e-Learning Project

==== LOM-FR ====
LOM-FR is a metadata profile developed for the education sector in France. This application profile was first published in 2006.

==== NL LOM ====
NL LOM is the Dutch metadata profile for educational resources in the Netherlands. This application profile was the result of merging the Dutch higher education LOM profile with the one used in primary and secondary Dutch education. The final version was released in 2011.

==== LOM-CH ====
LOM-CH is a metadata profile developed for the education sector in Switzerland. It is currently available in French and German. This application profile was published in July 2014.

==== LOM-ES ====
LOM-ES is a metadata profile developed for the education sector in Spain. It is available in Spanish.

==== LOM-GR ====
LOM-GR, also known as "LOM-GR Photodentro", is the Greek LOM application profile for educational resources, currently being used for resources related to school education. It was published in 2012 and is currently available in Greek and English. It is maintained by CTI DIOPHANTUS as part of the "Photodentro Federated Architecture for Educational Content for Schools" that includes a number of educational content repositories (for Learning Objects, Educational Video, and User Generated Content) and the Greek National Aggregator of Educational Content accumulating metadata from collections stored in repositories of other organizations. LOM-GR is a working specification of the TC48/WG3 working group of the Hellenic Organization for Standardization.

==== Others ====
Other application profiles are those developed by the Celebrate project and the metadata profile that is part of the SCORM reference model.

== See also ==
- Application profile
- Content package
- Dublin Core
- Learning object
- Metadata
- Metadata Standards
- OAI-PMH
- SCORM
- XML
- m:Learning Object Metadata
