= Content package =

File containing content in a database metadata

A content package is a file containing content in a database metadata.

A content package is used in e-learning to define some learning content or an assessment that can be delivered, for example by a Learning Management System. It's a standard way of describing learning content that can be read by many programs.

The most widely used content packaging format is that defined by IMS Global, which uses an XML manifest file called imsmanifest.xml wrapped up inside a zip file. The learning content itself is either included in the zip file if it is HTML or other media that can run on its own, or else is referenced as a URL from within the manifest.

The IMS format was used by SCORM to define their packaging format, and typically every sharable content object (SCO) is defined by a content package.

The AICC also define a content package format for material that can be called by the widely used AICC HACP standard. Their format consists of four comma separated ASCII files that define details about the learning content including a URL.
