= Online patient education =

Online patient education, also known as online patient engagement, is a method of providing medical information and education to patients using learning management systems delivered through the Internet. It is a type of computer-based instruction and includes web seminars, downloadable materials, interactive learning courses, and audio/visual presentations. Generally, online patient education is supplemented with in-person consultations tailored to each individual.

== General usage ==
Health professionals use online patient education to prepare patients for medical procedures, administer intake and informed consent paperwork, educate patients about health conditions, provide information about preventive care, encourage healthy behavior and lifestyle changes, etc. Health insurance companies use online patient education to inform patients about coverage policies.

Online patient education is gaining popularity as home Internet access becomes more common and medical practices increasingly utilize digital technologies. Patients either view online patient education programs and materials in a medical office or from their homes or other remote locations with Internet access. Content may include interactive features such as quizzes, live question and answer sessions (in moderated web seminars), and the ability to complete and submit forms.

== Patient education by type ==
=== On location ===
Any education delivered verbally by a healthcare provider to a single patient or group of patients can be considered as On Location patient education. Although this is still the most commonly used patient education method it is time-consuming, can have consistency problems, and relies heavily on the individual patient ability to absorb, understand, and retain the verbal information.

=== Paper based ===
The second most common method. Any information brochure at a healthcare provider office falls under this category. The benefits of printed materials is that patients can refer back to the information

=== Web based ===
Patient education that is made available by a healthcare provider via his/her website, specific portal, or EHR. Web based education can be provided in an Asynchronous and Synchronous styles.

== Advantages ==
Educating patients with online technology can be advantageous for both medical practices and patients because it gives health care providers the opportunity to create comprehensive educational materials that are consistently presented, rather than relying on face-to-face meetings in which information is presented by a staff member. Patients need not possess advanced computer/web skills to use this method of learning. A survey of 3200 patients revealed that even patients who are not computer literate are satisfied with online patient education as means of learning about medical care.
