= Corporate use of Second Life =

Virtual worlds are 3D computer environments where each user is represented with a character known as an avatar. Traditionally, virtual worlds have been used for entertainment. However, starting from approximately 2004 both corporate world and academia started to recognize business value of virtual worlds for training and education, collaboration, and marketing. Development and maturity of the virtual world Second Life played a significant role in corporate movement towards virtual worlds for several reasons:

- Second Life was the first public virtual world that did not offer any topic, or theme. Each user is free to create their own objects, personalized environment, and/or to hold any events of their choice. This immediately sparked the idea of creating meeting rooms and virtual classrooms, first within academia, quickly followed by corporate users. Later, meetings and events developed into more advanced uses, from training simulations and communication training using robotic avatars, to 3D visualization, prototyping and collaboration
- From 2005 to 2007 Second Life experienced rapid growth of the userbase. Companies were eager to reach this potential customer base and started marketing programs in Second Life. Without a good plan, knowledge of the audience and without good understanding of the new medium many of the early corporate marketing efforts failed, producing a backlash against corporate adoption of virtual worlds.
- Second Life provided a wide array of tools for building 3D objects, scripting language to apply required behavior to the objects and easy entry path (users can register and try everything free of charge, and can purchase their own land – to which they can control access).

By early 2010, several corporate applications of virtual worlds were shown to be successful:

== Corporate training ==
=== What can be done with virtual worlds that cannot be done otherwise ===
Generally, all kinds of learning involve several stages:

- Accumulation of knowledge is accomplished by absorbing information via reading materials, listening to live, videotaped or recorded lectures, and watching demonstrations. Also known as explicit knowledge, it has long been foundation of learning. Combination of classroom instruction and e-learning, provides a good way for acquiring explicit knowledge. Virtual worlds have a limited use and value during accumulation of knowledge stage, utilized perhaps to conduct classes in a virtual classroom. Several companies such as Virtual Training Partners have used Second Life's platform for corporate training.
- Practicing, also known as experiential learning, or learning by doing, or tacit knowledge should generally follow the accumulation of knowledge in order to make the learning productive. It is much harder to transfer to learners.

At this stage virtual worlds are irreplaceable. They provide an opportunity to create highly realistic simulations, allowing trainees to practice working with both equipment or other people in the environment closely resembling real life. The ability to practice in safe environment and record simulation results in a database or Learning Management System (LMS), as well as ability to study at a trainee's own pace, 24/7, makes virtual worlds in some cases superior to practicing in real world.

=== Procedural training ===
Almost all organizations have certain ways or procedures of doing things. Thus, procedural training is an important part of corporate training. Procedural training involves memorizing step-by-step how to perform a certain operation. Examples of operations can include anything from lock-out / tag-out equipment procedures on a manufacturing plant, preparing an experiment in chemical lab, or various medical procedures performed by a nurse.

Procedures can be difficult to learn by reading books, watching movies or listening to an instructor. A trainee may need to practice a procedure multiple times to receive the necessary skill. Virtual Worlds can be used for procedural training, since they allow for the creation of a realistic environment and tools for trainees to practice at their own pace, at any time, without a need to involve real life locations, equipment and instructors.

Training and Collaboration with Virtual Worlds describes training by The Nurse Anesthesia (NURA) Department of University of Kansas. A team led by David M. Antonacci and Stephanie P. Gerald of University of Kansas Medical Center Teaching & Learning Technologies (TLT) Department supported the technical side of the project. They created simulation of induction procedure for student nurses. Induction is a complex medical procedure in which a nurse anesthetist prepares a patient for surgery. It consists of many steps, and involves both "how to" knowledge (how to manipulate the equipment) and procedural knowledge (steps to do and what decision to make when). Second Life simulation helps students to learn procedural part in a safe and controlled learning space. It does not provide students with tactile feedback, and is not intended to teach them how to manipulate actual physical equipment or patients. These skills are better taught in physical world, using real equipment. Rather, it is the sequence of events that is at issue in the simulated training. For example, students learn when to use a laryngoscope in the induction procedure using simulation, but they learn how to use the laryngoscope for intubation later, using a real laryngoscope and a mannequin-like patient simulator.

Even though the virtual world does not provide practice with the physical "how-to" aspects of induction, the immersive setting does allow students to learn the sequence of steps and branching decision making—which, when it comes to anesthesia, is as important as the physical aspects. Separating these functions reduces cognitive load for the nurse in training, and improves the overall result by breaking a very complex procedure into manageable units. In other words, students master execution of the induction routine using the virtual world simulation. By the time they advance to the next level, they are able to concentrate fully on learning how to physically handle the patient and equipment without being distracted by trying to learn the sequence of steps.

=== Communication training ===
Communication training in virtual worlds started as synchronous role-play, similar to role-play sessions being conducted in a real life. Later emergence of robotic avatars technique provided an opportunity for conducting communication training asynchronous training. In this case trainee communicates with a robotic avatar, operated according to a script created by an instructional designer. The simulations with robotic avatars operate according to branching story method. Trainee selects the best response from a dialog; based on the selection robotic avatar performs certain actions and/or provides trainee with a response. During the next step trainee selects the next best response from the dialog and robotic avatar provides a new response. The advantage of this method is that trainees can practice at any time, at their own pace, without external pressure. At the same time, availability of only pre-scripted dialogs and the absence of a live instructor are certainly a disadvantage of this methodology that can be corrected by scheduling live role-play sessions and discussions with instructor in person or using Second Life.

== Enterprise collaboration ==
In the world of business, collaboration has become an important tool in reducing time-to-market and increasing cost savings. As more and more corporations acquire expanded or global presence and work projects are often supported by geographically dispersed teams, virtual collaboration becomes increasingly important. Second Life quickly became the natural venue for collaboration, including brainstorming sessions, meetings, conferences and a variety of events. Training and Collaboration with Virtual Worlds lists multiple examples of enterprise collaboration projects in Second Life by Cisco, Intel and Microsoft.

First meetings and conferences in Second Life closely resembled similar events in real life. Organizers put a lot of effort into creation of exact replicas of their university or corporate campuses. Soon, however, they realized that resources put into creation of buildings and auditoriums do not pay off. The ability to use unique advantages of virtual worlds, such as ability to record and map the flow of ideas in the conversations are significantly more important. The new generation of Second Life tools, such as collaborative knowledge management (CKM), allow a group of employees to create mind maps, flow charts and timelines in Second Life collaboratively in real time, and ability to create realistic models of complex objects that can be used for discussion and demonstration advances collaboration in the virtual world to a new level.
