= Educational technology =

Use of technology in education to enhance learning and teaching

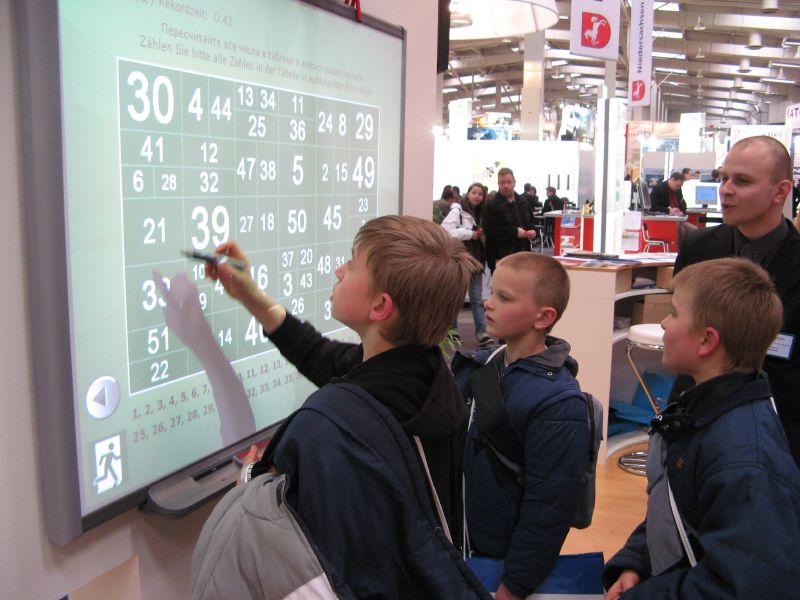
A student using an interactive whiteboard

Educational technology (often abbreviated as edtech) encompasses computer hardware, software, along with educational theories and practices, used to facilitate learning and teaching. When referred to by its abbreviation, "EdTech," it often denotes the industry of companies that develop educational technology.

In addition to practical educational experience, educational technology draws on theoretical knowledge from various disciplines such as communication, education, psychology, sociology, artificial intelligence, and computer science. It encompasses several domains, including learning theory, computer-based training, online learning, and mobile learning (m-learning).

== Definition ==
The Association for Educational Communications and Technology (AECT) has defined educational technology as "the study and ethical practice of facilitating learning and improving performance by creating, using, and managing appropriate technological processes and resources". It denotes instructional technology as "the theory and practice of design, development, utilization, management, and evaluation of processes and resources for learning". As such, Educational technology refers to various valid and reliable applications of educational science, such as equipment, as well as processes and procedures that are derived from scientific research, and in a given context may refer to theoretical, algorithmic or heuristic processes: it does not necessarily refer only to physical technology. Educational technology is the process of integrating technology into education in a positive manner that promotes a more diverse and inclusive learning environment, enabling students to develop both technological literacy and subject-specific knowledge alongside their regular academic assignments.

Accordingly, there are several discrete aspects to describing the intellectual and technical development of educational technology:

- Educational technology as the theory and practice of educational approaches to learning.
- Educational technology as technological tools and media, for instance massive online courses, that assist in the communication of knowledge, and its development and exchange. This is usually what people are referring to when they use the term "edtech".
- Educational technology for learning management systems (LMSs), such as tools for student and curriculum management, and education management information systems (EMIS).
- Educational technology as back-office management, such as training management systems for logistics and budget management, and Learning Record Store (LRS) for learning data storage and analysis.
- Educational technology itself as an educational subject; such courses may be called "computer studies" or "information and communications technology (ICT)".

=== Related terms ===
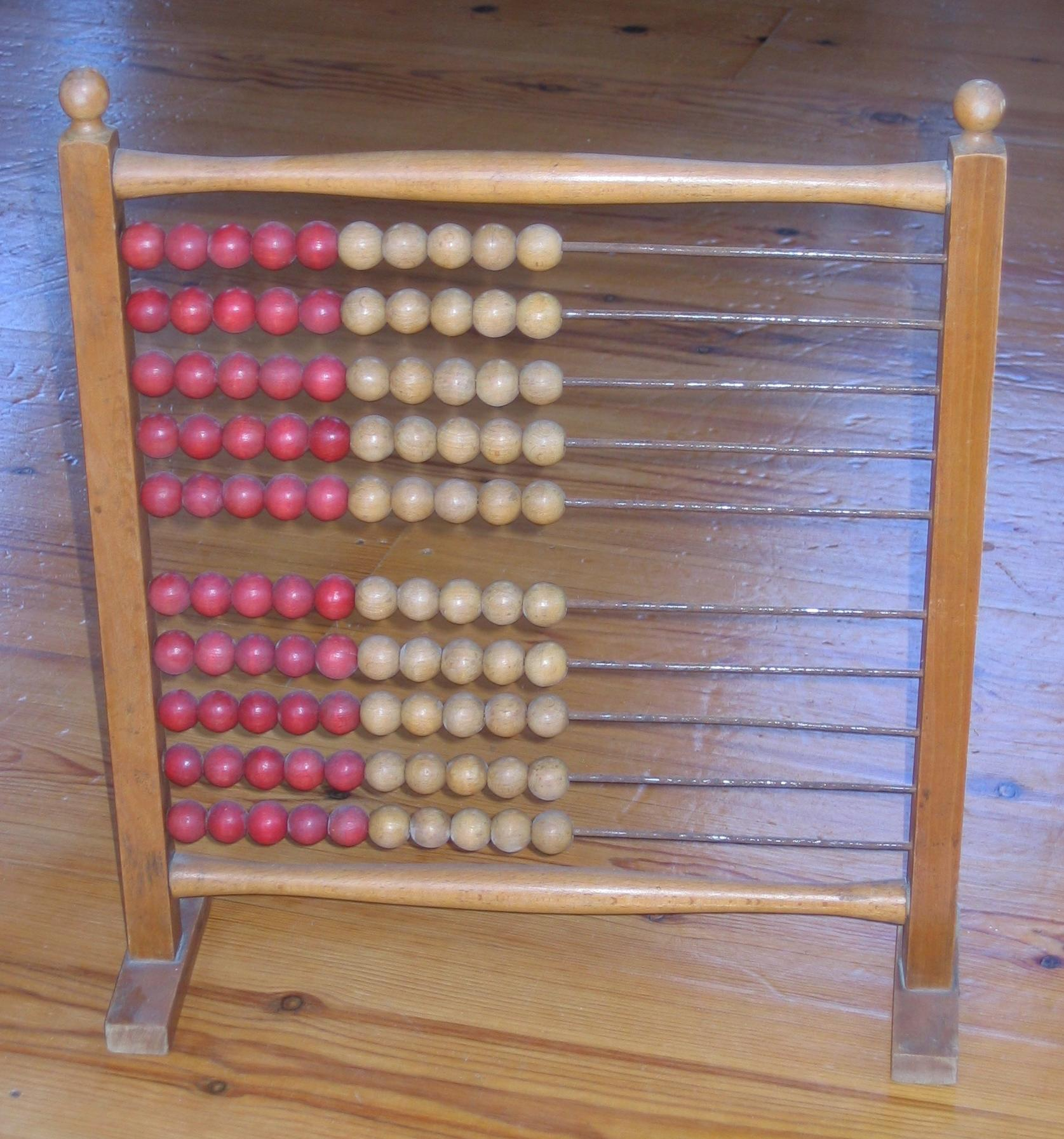
Early 20th-century abacus used in a Danish elementary school

Educational technology is an inclusive term that refers to both the tools and processes used to support learning and teaching, as well as the theoretical foundations behind them. It is not limited to modern digital systems; instead, it encompasses any resource or method that improves instructional delivery, whether through blended learning, traditional face-to-face teaching, or online environments.

Professionals trained in this field are known as educational technologists, responsible for analysing, designing, developing and evaluating learning systems and tools to enhance educational outcomes. The term learning technologist is commonly used in the United Kingdom, while Canada and several other regions use the term interchangeably. Educational technology encompasses e-learning, instructional technology, information and communication technology (ICT) in education, edtech, learning technology, multimedia learning, technology-enhanced learning (TEL), computer-based instruction (CBI), computer managed instruction, computer-based training (CBT), computer-assisted instruction or computer-aided instruction (CAI), internet-based training (IBT), flexible learning, web-based training (WBT), online education, digital educational collaboration, distributed learning, computer-mediated communication, cyber-learning, and multi-modal instruction, virtual education, personal learning environments, networked learning, virtual learning environments (VLE) (which are also called learning platforms), m-learning, and digital education.

Each of these numerous terms has had its advocates, who point up potential distinctive features. However, many terms and concepts in educational technology have been defined nebulously. For example, Singh and Thurman cite over 45 definitions for online learning. Moreover, Moore saw these terminologies as emphasizing particular features such as digitization approaches, components, or delivery methods rather than being fundamentally dissimilar in concept or principle. For example, m-learning emphasizes mobility, which allows for altered timing, location, accessibility, and context of learning; nevertheless, its purpose and conceptual principles are those of educational technology.

In practice, as technology has advanced, the particular "narrowly defined" terminological aspect that was initially emphasized by name has blended into the general field of educational technology. Initially, "virtual learning" as narrowly defined in a semantic sense implied entering an environmental simulation within a virtual world, for example, in treating posttraumatic stress disorder (PTSD). In practice, a "virtual education course" refers to any instructional course in which all, or at least a significant portion, is delivered by the Internet. "Virtual" is used in that broader way to describe a course that is not taught in a classroom face-to-face but "virtually" with people not having to go to the physical classroom to learn. Accordingly, virtual education refers to a form of distance learning in which course content is delivered using various methods such as course management applications, multimedia resources, and videoconferencing. Virtual education and simulated learning such as games or dissections, inspire students to connect classroom content to authentic situations.

Educational content, pervasively embedded in objects, is all around the learner, who may not even be conscious of the learning process. The combination of adaptive learning, using an individualized interface and materials, which accommodate to an individual, who thus receives personally differentiated instruction, with ubiquitous access to digital resources and learning opportunities in a range of places and at various times, has been termed smart learning. Smart learning is a component of the smart city concept.

== History ==
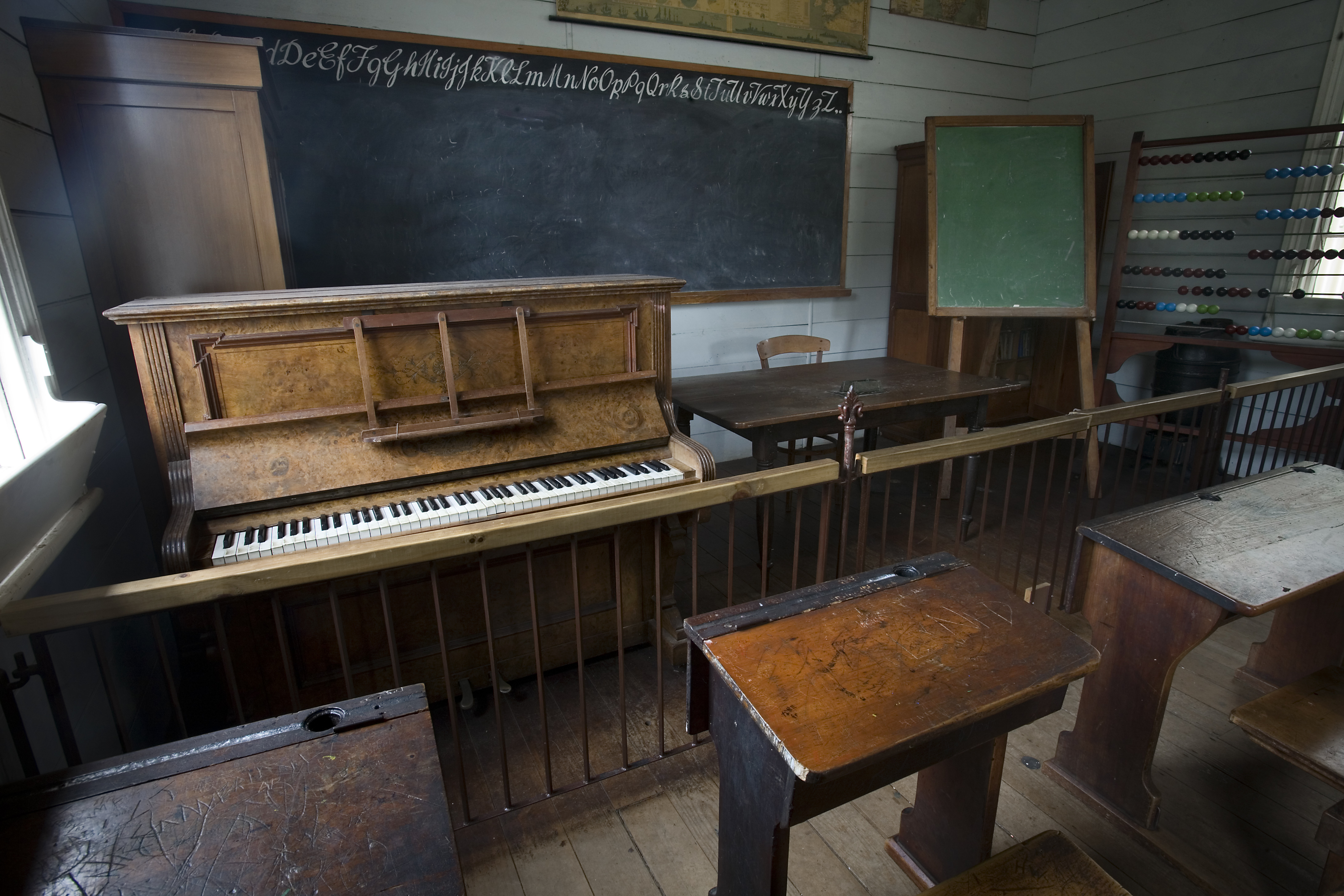
19th-century classroom, Auckland

Helping people and children learn in ways that are easier, faster, more accurate, or less expensive can be traced back to the emergence of very early tools, such as paintings on cave walls. Various types of abacus have been used. Writing slates and blackboards have been used for at least a millennium. Since their introduction, books and pamphlets have played a prominent role in education. From the early twentieth century, duplicating machines such as the mimeograph and Gestetner stencil devices were used to produce short copy runs (typically 10–50 copies) for classroom or home use. The use of media for instructional purposes is generally traced back to the first decade of the 20th century with the introduction of educational films (the 1900s) and Sidney Pressey's mechanical teaching machines (1920s).

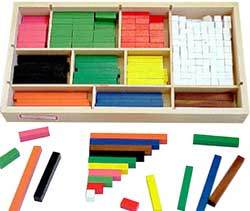
Cuisenaire rods

In the mid-1960s, Stanford University psychology professors, Patrick Suppes and Richard C. Atkinson, experimented with using computers to teach arithmetic and spelling via Teletypes to elementary school students in the Palo Alto Unified School District in California.

Online education originated from the University of Illinois in 1960. Although the internet would not be created for another decade, students were able to access class information with linked computer terminals. Online learning emerged in 1982 when the Western Behavioral Sciences Institute in La Jolla, California, opened its School of Management and Strategic Studies. The school employed computer conferencing through the New Jersey Institute of Technology's Electronic Information Exchange System (EIES) to deliver a distance education program to business executives. Starting in 1985, Connected Education offered the first totally online master's degree in media studies, through The New School in New York City, also via the EIES computer conferencing system. Subsequent courses were offered in 1986 by the Electronic University Network for DOS and Commodore 64 computers. In 2002, MIT began providing online classes free of charge. As of 2009, approximately 5.5 million students were taking at least one class online.Currently, one out of three college students takes at least one online course while in college. At DeVry University, out of all students that are earning a bachelor's degree, 80% earn two-thirds of their requirements online. Also, in 2014, 2.85 million students out of 5.8 million students that took courses online, took all of their courses online. From this information, it can be concluded that the number of students taking classes online is on a steady increase.

In 1971, Ivan Illich published a hugely influential book, Deschooling Society, in which he envisioned "learning webs" as a model for people to network the learning they needed. The 1970s and 1980s saw notable contributions in computer-based learning by Murray Turoff and Starr Roxanne Hiltz at the New Jersey Institute of Technology as well as developments at the University of Guelph in Canada. In the UK, the Council for Educational Technology supported the use of educational technology, in particular administering the government's National Development Programme in Computer Aided Learning (1973–1977) and the Microelectronics Education Programme (1980–1986).

Videoconferencing was an important forerunner to the educational technologies known today. This work was especially popular with museum education. Even in recent years, videoconferencing has risen in popularity to reach over 20,000 students across the United States and Canada in 2008–2009. Disadvantages of this form of educational technology are readily apparent: image and sound quality are often grainy or pixelated; videoconferencing requires setting up a type of mini-television studio within the museum for broadcast; space becomes an issue; and specialized equipment is required for both the provider and the participant.

The Open University in Britain and the University of British Columbia (where Web CT, now incorporated into Blackboard Inc., was first developed) began a revolution of using the Internet to deliver learning, making heavy use of web-based training, online distance learning, and online discussion between students. Practitioners such as Harasim (1995) put heavy emphasis on the use of learning networks.

By 1994, the first online high school had been founded. In 1997, Graziadei described criteria for evaluating products and developing technology-based courses that include being portable, replicable, scalable, affordable, and having a high probability of long-term cost-effectiveness.

The relationship between education and technology has emerged as a pivotal aspect of contemporary development, propelled by rapid expansion of internet connectivity and mobile penetration. Improved Internet functionality enabled new schemes of communication with multimedia or webcams. The National Center for Education Statistics estimates the number of K-12 students enrolled in online distance learning programs increased by 65% from 2002 to 2005, with greater flexibility, ease of communication between teacher and student, and quick lecture and assignment feedback.

According to a 2008 study conducted by the U.S. Department of Education, during the 2006–2007 academic year, about 66% of postsecondary public and private schools participating in student financial aid programs offered some distance learning courses; records show 77% of enrollment in for-credit courses with an online component. In 2008, the Council of Europe passed a statement endorsing e-learning's potential to drive equality and education improvements across the EU.

Computer-mediated communication (CMC) is between learners and instructors, mediated by the computer. In contrast, CBT/CBL usually means individualized (self-study) learning, while CMC involves educator/tutor facilitation and requires the scalarization of flexible learning activities. In addition, modern ICT provides education with tools for sustaining learning communities and associated knowledge management tasks.

Students growing up in this digital age have extensive exposure to a variety of media. Major high-tech companies have funded schools to provide them with the ability to teach their students through technology.

2015 was the first year that private nonprofit organizations enrolled more online students than for-profits, although public universities still enrolled the highest number of online students. In the fall of 2015, more than 6 million students enrolled in at least one online course.

In 2020, due to the COVID-19 pandemic, many schools across the world were forced to close, which left more and more grade-school students participating in online learning, and university-level students enrolling in online courses to enforce distance learning. Organizations such as UNESCO have enlisted educational technology solutions to help schools facilitate distance education. The pandemic's extended lockdowns and focus on distance learning has attracted record-breaking amounts of venture capital to the ed-tech sector. In 2020, in the United States alone, ed-tech startups raised $1.78 billion in venture capital spanning 265 deals, compared to $1.32 billion in 2019.

Post pandemic, teachers use digital technologies less but still use them more than they did prior to the COVID-19 pandemic.

== Theory ==
=== Behaviorism ===
This theoretical framework was developed in the early 20th century based on animal learning experiments by Ivan Pavlov, Edward Thorndike, Edward C. Tolman, Clark L. Hull, and B.F. Skinner. Many psychologists used these results to develop theories of human learning, but modern educators generally see behaviorism as one aspect of a holistic synthesis. Teaching in behaviorism has been linked to training, emphasizing animal learning experiments. Since behaviorism consists of the view of teaching people how to do something with rewards and punishments, it is related to training people.

B.F. Skinner wrote extensively on improvements in teaching based on his functional analysis of verbal behavior and wrote "The Technology of Teaching", an attempt to dispel the myths underlying contemporary education as well as promote his system he called programmed instruction. Ogden Lindsley developed a learning system, named Celeration, which was based on behavior analysis but substantially differed from Keller's and Skinner's models.

=== Cognitivism ===
Cognitive science underwent significant change in the 1960s and 1970s to the point that some described the period as a "cognitive revolution", particularly in reaction to behaviorism. While retaining the empirical framework of behaviorism, cognitive psychology theories look beyond behavior to explain brain-based learning by considering how human memory works to promote learning. It refers to learning as "all processes by which the sensory input is transformed, reduced, elaborated, stored, recovered, and used" by the human mind. The Atkinson-Shiffrin memory model and Baddeley's working memory model were established as theoretical frameworks. Computer science and information technology have had a major influence on cognitive science theory. The cognitive concepts of working memory (formerly known as short-term memory) and long-term memory have been facilitated by research and technology from the field of computer science. Another major influence on the field of cognitive science is Noam Chomsky. Today researchers are concentrating on topics like cognitive load, information processing, and media psychology. These theoretical perspectives influence instructional design.

There are two separate schools of cognitivism, and these are the cognitivist and social cognitivist. The former focuses on the understanding of the thinking or cognitive processes of an individual while the latter includes social processes as influences in learning besides cognition. These two schools, however, share the view that learning is more than a behavioral change but is rather a mental process used by the learner.

=== Constructivism ===
Educational psychologists distinguish between several types of constructivism: individual (or psychological) constructivism, such as Piaget's theory of cognitive development, and social constructivism. This form of constructivism has a primary focus on how learners construct their own meaning from new information, as they interact with reality and with other learners who bring different perspectives. Constructivist learning environments require students to use their prior knowledge and experiences to formulate new, related, and/or adaptive concepts in learning. Under this framework, the role of the teacher becomes that of a facilitator, providing guidance so that learners can construct their own knowledge. Constructivist educators must make sure that the prior learning experiences are appropriate and related to the concepts being taught. Jonassen (1997) suggests "well-structured" learning environments are useful for novice learners and that "ill-structured" environments are only useful for more advanced learners. Educators utilizing a constructivist perspective may emphasize an active learning environment that may incorporate learner-centered problem-based learning, project-based learning, and inquiry-based learning, ideally involving real-world scenarios, in which students are actively engaged in critical thinking activities. An illustrative discussion and example can be found in the 1980s deployment of constructivist cognitive learning in computer literacy, which involved programming as an instrument of learning. LOGO, a programming language, embodied an attempt to integrate Piagetian ideas with computers and technology. Initially there were broad, hopeful claims, including "perhaps the most controversial claim" that it would "improve general problem-solving skills" across disciplines. However, LOGO programming skills did not consistently yield cognitive benefits. It was "not as concrete" as advocates claimed, it privileged "one form of reasoning over all others", and it was difficult to apply the thinking activity to non-LOGO-based activities. By the late 1980s, LOGO and other similar programming languages had lost their novelty and dominance and were gradually de-emphasized amid criticisms.

== Practice ==
The extent to which e-learning assists or replaces other learning and teaching approaches is variable, ranging on a continuum from none to fully online distance learning. A variety of descriptive terms have been employed (somewhat inconsistently) to categorize the extent to which technology is used. For example, "hybrid learning" or "blended learning" may refer to classroom aids and laptops, or may refer to approaches in which traditional classroom time is reduced but not eliminated, and is replaced with some online learning. "Distributed learning" may describe either the e-learning component of a hybrid approach, or fully online distance learning environments.

The involvement of innovation in education is crucial for ensuring equal access tools that can have a significant impact on the lives of both educators and students. To develop effective strategies that cater to the specific needs of a developing society, several important themes can be identified. One important theme is the necessity to provide students with access to appropriate learning materials, particularly in their native languages, as this facilitates better comprehension of subjects. In this context, it is essential for education to adopt a humanistic approach, particularly in light of the increasing usage of digital technologies.

An example of the application of innovative technology in education is the implementation of an AI-based tutoring system at an entry-level IT school in Pensacola by the U.S. Navy. This system incorporates a human tutor who closely monitors the progress of the students and provides individual assessments.The adaptive nature of the technology appears to have a mainly positive impact on students, as it can assist individuals with diverse learning styles and better equip them to learn independently.

=== Synchronous and asynchronous ===
E-learning may either be synchronous or asynchronous. Synchronous learning occurs in real-time, with all participants interacting at the same time. In contrast, asynchronous learning is self-paced and allows participants to engage in the exchange of ideas or information without the dependency on other participants' involvement at the same time.

Synchronous learning refers to exchanging ideas and information with one or more participants during the same period. Examples are face-to-face discussion, online real-time live teacher instruction and feedback, Skype conversations, and chat rooms or virtual classrooms where everyone is online and working collaboratively at the same time. Since students are working collaboratively, synchronized learning helps students become more open-minded because they have to actively listen and learn from their peers. Synchronized learning fosters online awareness and improves many students' writing skills.

Asynchronous learning may use technologies such as learning management systems, email, blogs, wikis, and discussion boards, as well as web-supported textbooks, hypertext documents, audio video courses, and social networking using web 2.0. At the professional educational level, training may include virtual operating rooms. Asynchronous learning is beneficial for students who have health problems or who have childcare responsibilities. They have the opportunity to complete their work in a low-stress environment and within a more flexible time frame. In asynchronous online courses, students are allowed the freedom to complete work at their own pace. Being non-traditional students, they can manage their daily life and school and still have the social aspect. Asynchronous collaborations allow the student to reach out for help when needed and provide helpful guidance, depending on how long it takes them to complete the assignment. Many tools used for these courses are but are not limited to: videos, class discussions, and group projects.

=== Linear learning ===
Computer-based training (CBT) refers to self-paced learning activities delivered on a computer or handheld devices such as a tablet or smartphone. CBT initially delivered content via CD-ROM, and typically presented content linearly, much like reading an online book or manual. For this reason, CBT is often used to teach static processes, such as using software or completing mathematical equations. Computer-based training is conceptually similar to web-based training (WBT), which is delivered via Internet using a web browser.

Assessing learning in a CBT is often by assessments that can be easily scored by a computer such as multiple-choice questions, drag-and-drop, radio button, simulation, or other interactive means. Assessments are easily scored and recorded via online software, providing immediate end-user feedback and completion status. Users are often able to print completion records in the form of certificates.

CBTs provide learning stimulus beyond traditional learning methodology from textbook, manual, or classroom-based instruction. CBTs can be a good alternative to printed learning materials since rich media, including videos or animations, can be embedded to enhance learning.

However, CBTs pose some learning challenges. Typically, creating effective CBTs requires enormous resources. The software for developing CBTs is often more complex than what a subject matter expert or teacher is able to use.

=== Collaborative learning ===
Computer-supported collaborative learning (CSCL) uses instructional methods designed to encourage or require students to work together on learning tasks, allowing social learning. CSCL is similar in concept to the terminology, "e-learning 2.0" and "networked collaborative learning" (NCL). With Web 2.0 advances, sharing information between multiple people in a network has become much easier and use has increased. One of the main reasons cited for its usage is that it serves as "a breeding ground for creative and engaging educational endeavors." Learning takes place through conversations about content and grounded interaction about problems and actions. This collaborative learning differs from instruction in which the instructor is the principal source of knowledge and skills. The neologism "e-learning 1.0" refers to direct instruction used in early computer-based learning and training systems (CBL). In contrast to that linear delivery of content, often directly from the instructor's material, CSCL uses social software such as blogs, social media, wikis, podcasts, cloud-based document portals, discussion groups and virtual worlds. This phenomenon has been described as "long-tail learning". Advocates of social learning claim that one of the best ways to learn something is to teach it to others. Social networks have been used to foster online learning communities around subjects as diverse as test preparation and language education. Mobile-assisted language learning (MALL) is the use of handheld computers or cell phones to assist in language learning.

Collaborative apps allow students and teachers to interact while studying. Apps are designed after games, which provide a fun way to revise. When the experience is enjoyable, the students become more engaged. Games also usually come with a sense of progression, which can help keep students motivated and consistent while trying to improve.

Classroom 2.0 refers to online multi-user virtual environments (MUVEs) that connect schools across geographical frontiers. Known as "eTwinning", computer-supported collaborative learning (CSCL) allows learners in one school to communicate with learners in another that they would not get to know otherwise, enhancing educational outcomes and cultural integration.

Further, many researchers distinguish between collaborative and cooperative approaches to group learning. For example, Roschelle and Teasley (1995) argue that "cooperation is accomplished by the division of labor among participants, as an activity where each person is responsible for a portion of the problem solving", in contrast with collaboration that involves the "mutual engagement of participants in a coordinated effort to solve the problem together."

Social technology, and social media specifically, provides avenues for student learning that would not be available otherwise. For example, it provides ordinary students a chance to exist in the same room as, and share a dialogue with researchers, politicians, and activists. This is because it lowers the geographical barriers that would otherwise separate people. Simplified, social media gives students a reach that provides them with opportunities and conversations that allow them to grow as communicators.

Social technologies like X can provide students with an archive of free data that goes back multiple decades. Many classrooms and educators are already taking advantage of this free resource—for example, researchers and educators at the University of Central Florida in 2011 used Tweets posted relating to emergencies like Hurricane Irene as data points, in order to teach their students how to code data. Social media technologies also allow instructors the ability to show students how professional networks facilitate work on a technical level.

=== Flipped classroom ===
This is an instructional strategy where the majority of the initial learning occurs first at home using technology. Then, students will engage with higher-order learning tasks in the classroom with the teacher. Often, online tools are used for the individual at-home learning, such as: educational videos, learning management systems, interactive tools, and other web-based resources. Some purported advantages of flipped learning include improved learning performance, enhanced student satisfaction and engagement, flexibility in learning, and increased interaction opportunities between students and instructors. On the other hand, the disadvantages of flipped learning involve challenges related to student motivation, internet accessibility, quality of videos, and increased workload for teachers.

== Technologies ==
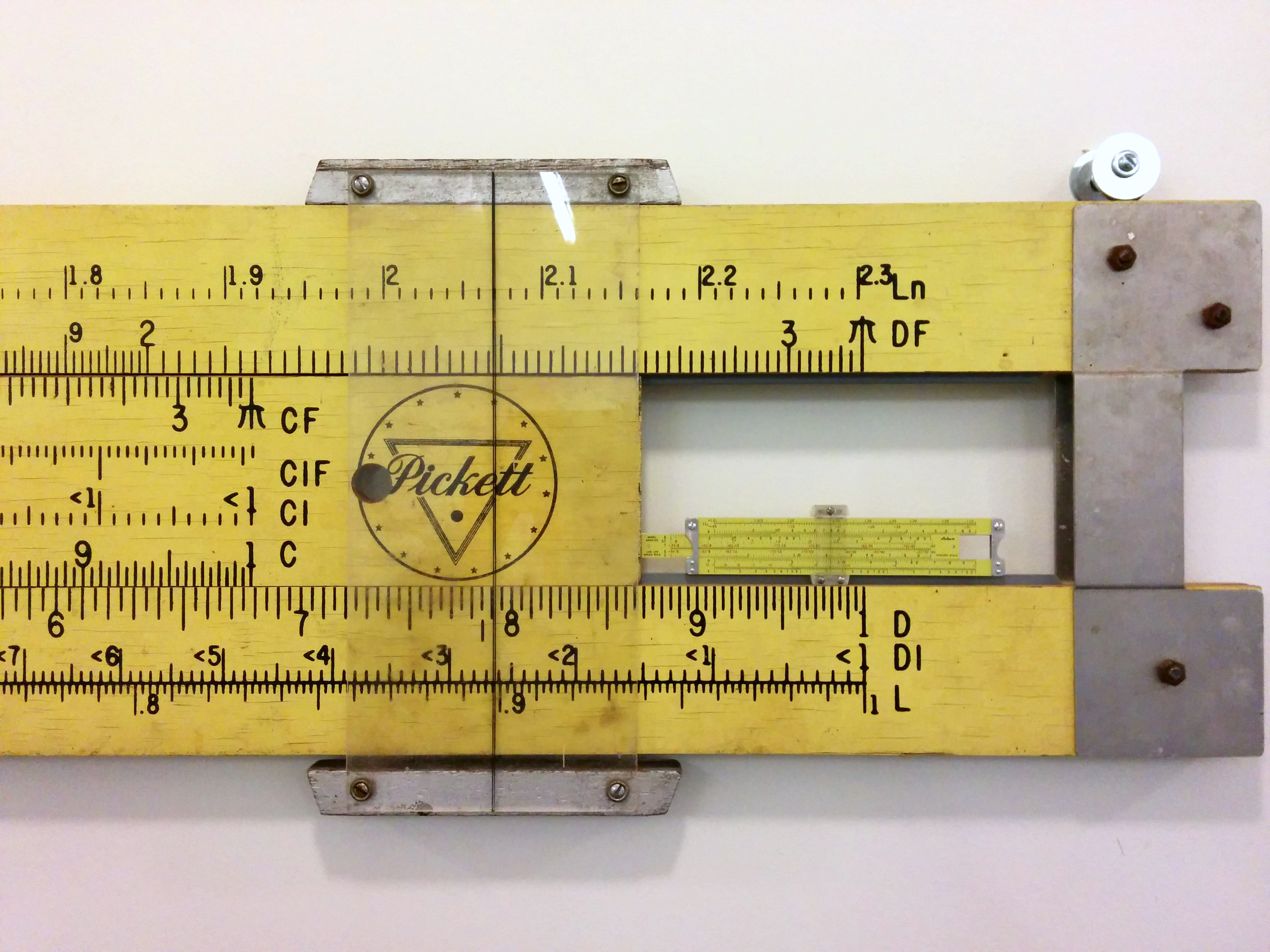
A 2.5 m teaching slide rule compared to a normal sized model

Numerous types of physical technology are currently used: digital cameras, VR headsets, video cameras, interactive whiteboard tools, document cameras, electronic media, and LCD projectors. Combinations of these techniques include blogs, collaborative software, ePortfolios, and virtual classrooms.

The current design of this type of application includes the evaluation through tools of cognitive analysis that allow one to identify which elements optimize the use of these platforms.

=== Audio and video ===
Video technology has included VHS tapes and DVDs, as well as on-demand and synchronous methods with digital video via server or web-based options such as streamed video and webcams. Videotelephony can connect with speakers and other experts. Interactive digital video games are being used at K-12 and higher education institutions.

Screencasting allows users to share their screens directly from their browser and make the video available online so that other viewers can stream the video directly.

Webcams and webcasting have enabled the creation of virtual classrooms and virtual learning environments. Webcams are also being used to counter plagiarism and other forms of academic dishonesty that might occur in an e-learning environment.

=== Computers, tablets, and mobile devices ===
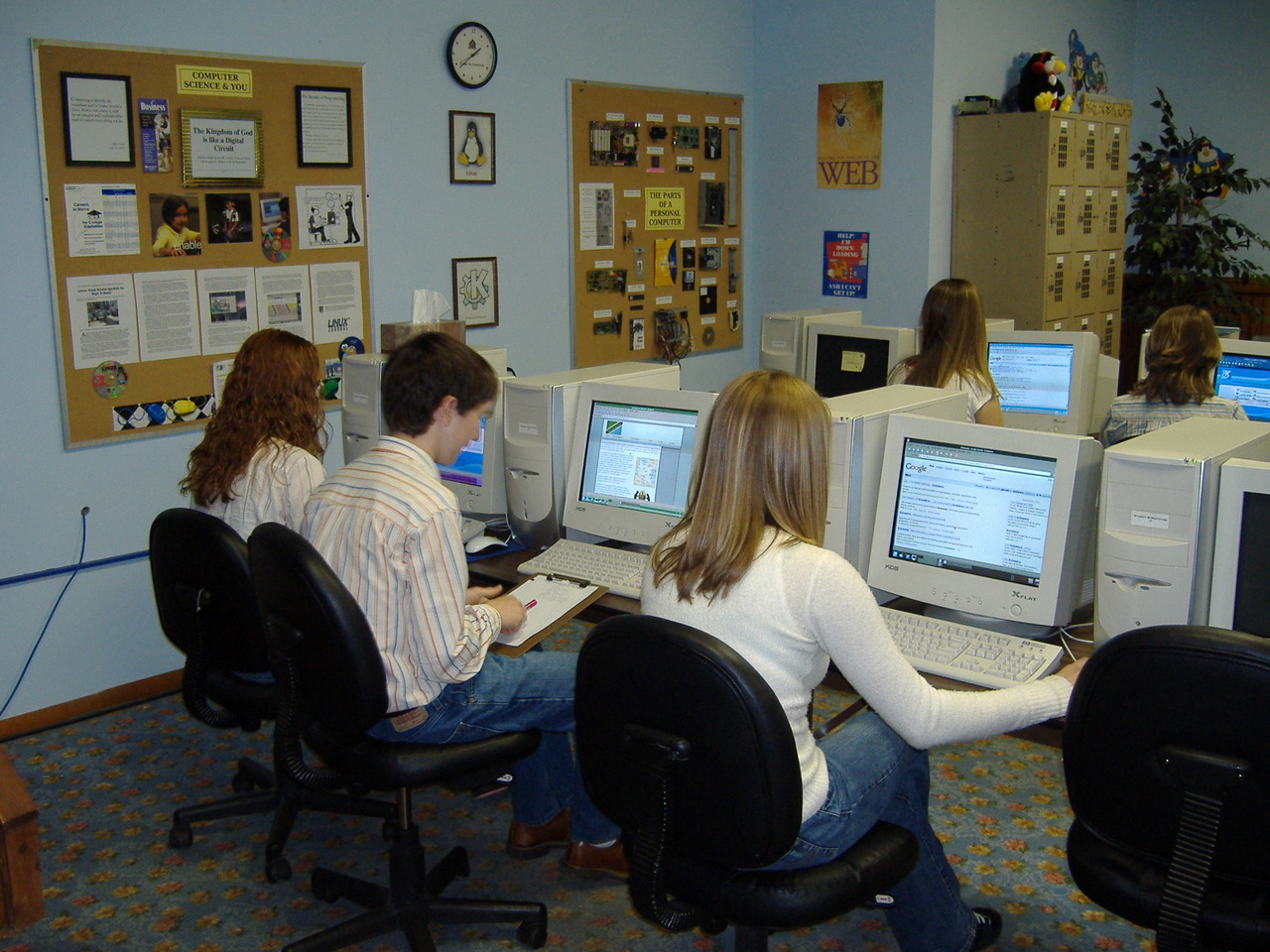
Teaching and learning online

Computers and tablets enable learners and educators to access websites as well as applications. Many mobile devices support m-learning. However, many learners do not have much chance to practice with digital technology in schools. In 2023, even in the world's richest countries, only around 10% of 15-year-old students used digital devices for more than one hour per week in mathematics and science.

Mobile devices such as clickers and smartphones can be used for interactive audience response feedback. Mobile learning can provide performance support for checking the time, setting reminders, retrieving worksheets, and instruction manuals. However, UNESCO has warned that the mere presence of mobile phones in schools has also been shown to be a distraction to learning, leading to a growing trend of countries regulating their use in education settings.

Such devices as iPads are used for helping disabled (visually impaired or with multiple disabilities) children in communication development as well as in improving physiological activity, according to the stimulation Practice Report.

Studies in pre-school (early learning), primary and secondary education have explored how digital devices are used to enable effective learning outcomes, and create systems that can support teachers. Digital technology can improve teaching and learning by motivating students with engaging, interactive, and fun learning environments. These online interactions enable further opportunities to develop digital literacy, 21st century skills, and digital citizenship.

=== Single-board computers and Internet of Things ===
Embedded single-board computers and microcontrollers such as Raspberry Pi, Arduino and BeagleBone are easy to program, some can run Linux and connect to devices such as sensors, displays, LEDs and robotics. These are cost effective computing devices ideal for learning programming, which work with cloud computing and the Internet of Things. The Internet of things refers to a type of network to connect anything with the Internet-based on stipulated protocols through information sensing equipment to conduct information exchange and communications to achieve smart recognitions, positioning, tracking, monitoring, and administration. These devices are part of a Maker culture that embraces tinkering with electronics and programming to achieve software and hardware solutions. The Maker Culture means there is a huge amount of training and support available.

=== Collaborative and social learning ===
Group webpages, blogs, wikis, and Twitter allow learners and educators to post thoughts, ideas, and comments on a website in an interactive learning environment. Social networking sites are virtual communities for people interested in a particular subject to communicate by voice, chat, instant message, video conference, or blogs. The National School Boards Association found that 96% of students with online access have used social networking technologies and more than 50% talk online about schoolwork. Social networking encourages collaboration and engagement and can be a motivational tool for self-efficacy amongst students.

=== Whiteboards ===
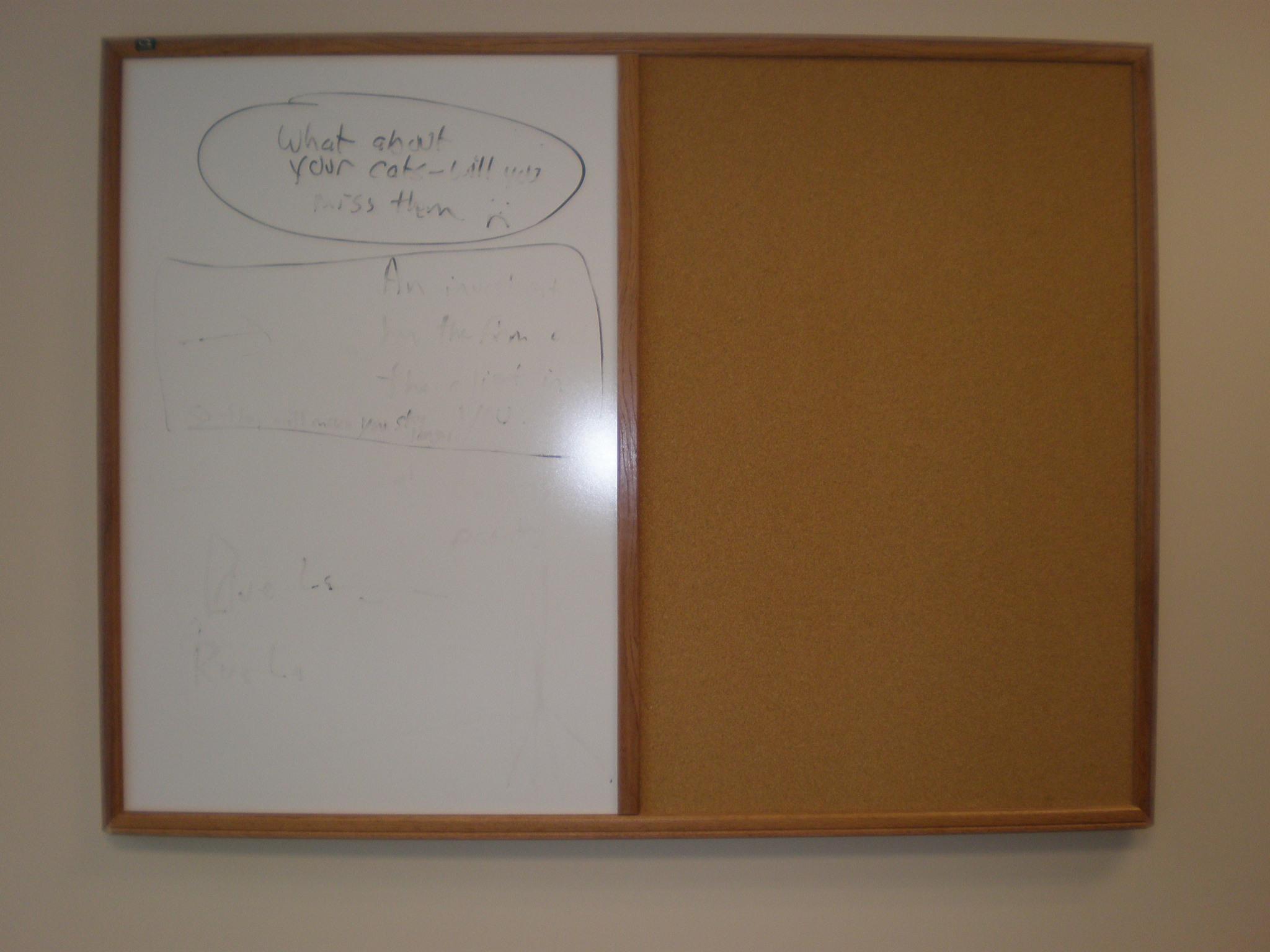
Combination whiteboard and bulletin board

There are three types of whiteboards. The initial whiteboards, analogous to blackboards, date from the late 1950s. The term whiteboard is also used metaphorically to refer to virtual whiteboards in which computer software applications simulate whiteboards by allowing writing or drawing. This is a common feature of groupware for virtual meetings, collaboration, and instant messaging. Interactive whiteboards allow learners and instructors to write on the touch screen. The screen markup can be on either a blank whiteboard or any computer screen content. Depending on permission settings, this visual learning can be interactive and participatory, including writing and manipulating images on the interactive whiteboard.

=== Virtual classroom ===
A virtual learning environment (VLE), also known as a learning platform, simulates a virtual classroom or meeting by simultaneously mixing several communication technologies. Web conferencing software enables students and instructors to communicate with each other via webcam, microphone, and real-time chatting in a group setting. Participants can raise their hands, answer polls, or take tests. Students can whiteboard and screencast when given rights by the instructor, who sets permission levels for text notes, microphone rights, and mouse control.

A virtual classroom provides an opportunity for students to receive direct instruction from a qualified teacher in an interactive environment. Learners can have direct and immediate access to their instructor for instant feedback and direction. The virtual classroom provides a structured schedule of classes, which can be helpful for students who may find the freedom of asynchronous learning to be overwhelming. Besides, the virtual classroom provides a social learning environment that replicates the traditional "brick and mortar" classroom. In addition to formal virtual classrooms, students may use online platforms such as StudySoup to access and share class notes and study guides.

In higher education especially, a virtual learning environment (VLE) is sometimes combined with a management information system (MIS) to create a managed learning environment, in which all aspects of a course are handled through a consistent user interface throughout the institution. Physical universities and newer online-only colleges offer to select academic degrees and certificate programs via the Internet. Some programs require students to attend some campus classes or orientations, but many are delivered completely online. Several universities offer online student support services, such as online advising and registration, e-counseling, online textbook purchases, student governments, and student newspapers.

Due to the COVID-19 pandemic, many schools have been forced to move online. As of April 2020, an estimated 90% of high-income countries are offering online learning, with only 25% of low-income countries offering the same.

==== Augmented reality ====
AR technology may play an important role in the future of the classroom where human co-orchestration takes place seamlessly. Early efforts with AR apps and technologies in schools did not result in broad adoption over the long term.

=== Learning management system ===
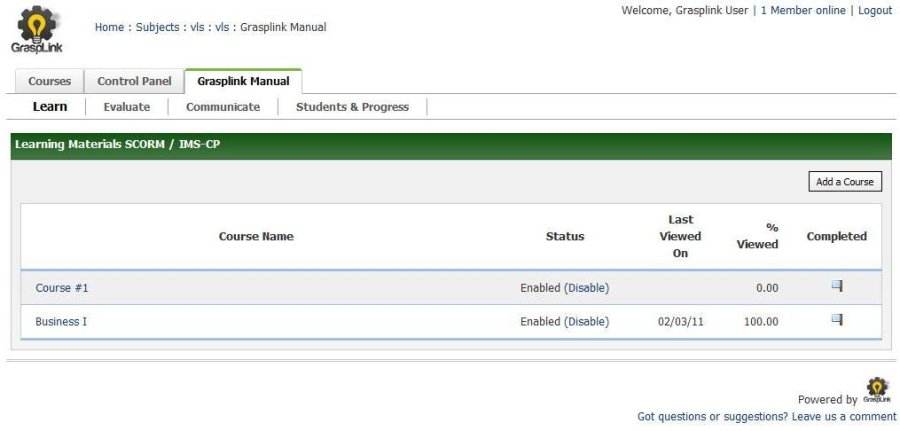
Learning management system

A learning management system (LMS) is software used for delivering, tracking, and managing training and education. It tracks data about attendance, time on task, and student progress. Educators can post announcements, grade assignments, check on course activities, and participate in class discussions. Students can submit their work, read and respond to discussion questions, and take quizzes. An LMS may allow teachers, administrators, and students, and permitted additional parties (such as parents, if appropriate) to track various metrics. LMSs range from systems for managing training/educational records to software for distributing courses over the Internet and offering features for online collaboration. The creation and maintenance of comprehensive learning content require substantial initial and ongoing investments in human labor. Effective translation into other languages and cultural contexts requires even more investment by knowledgeable personnel.

==== Learning content management system ====
A learning content management system (LCMS) is software for author content (courses, reusable content objects). An LCMS may be solely dedicated to producing and publishing content that is hosted on an LMS, or it can host the content itself. The Aviation Industry Computer-Based Training Committee (AICC) specification provides support for content that is hosted separately from the LMS.

==== Computer-aided assessment ====
Computer-aided assessment (e-assessment) ranges from automated multiple-choice tests to more sophisticated systems. With some systems, feedback can be geared towards a student's specific mistakes, or the computer can navigate the student through a series of questions adapting to what the student appears to have learned or not learned. Formative assessment sifts out the incorrect answers, and these questions are then explained by the teacher. The learner then practices with slight variations of the sifted-out questions. The learning cycle often concludes with summative assessment, using a new set of questions that cover the topics previously taught.

==== Training management system ====
A training management system or training resource management system is software designed to optimize instructor-led training management. Similar to an enterprise resource planning (ERP), it is a back office tool that aims at streamlining every aspect of the training process: planning (training plan and budget forecasting), logistics (scheduling and resource management), financials (cost tracking, profitability), reporting, and sales for-profit training providers.

=== Other software and hardware ===
- List of iPads and Magic Keyboard for iPad
- Comparison of music education software
- Comparison of tablet computers
- Chromebooks
- List of laptops
- GPU workstations
- List of music software
- List of guitar tablature software and List of piano software
- Comparison of scorewriters
- Digital audio workstations and music studio
- Electronic drum set and modern electronic musical instruments
- Graphics tablets and stylus
- List of 3D modeling software and List of 3D rendering software
- Lists of mathematical software and List of open-source software for mathematics
- List of computational writing software
- List of computational art software
- List of online integrated development environments
- Digital textbooks, e-book software, and audiobooks
- Comparison of e-readers, comparison of iOS e-reader software, and comparison of Android e-reader software

== Standards and ecosystem ==
=== Content ===
Content and design architecture issues include pedagogy and learning object re-use. One approach looks at five aspects:

- Fact – unique data (e.g. symbols for Excel formula, or the parts that make up a learning objective)
- Concept – a category that includes multiple examples (e.g. Excel formulas, or the various types/theories of instructional design)
- Process – a flow of events or activities (e.g. how a spreadsheet works, or the five phases in ADDIE)
- Procedure – step-by-step task (e.g. entering a formula into a spreadsheet or the steps that should be followed within a phase in ADDIE)
- Strategic principle – a task performed by adapting guidelines (e.g. doing a financial projection in a spreadsheet, or using a framework for designing learning environments)

=== Artificial intelligence ===
The academic study and development of artificial intelligence can be dated to at least 1956 when cognitive scientists began to investigate thought and learning processes in humans and machines. The earliest uses of AI in education can be traced to the development of intelligent tutoring systems (ITS) and their application in enhancing educational experiences. They are designed to provide immediate and personalized feedback to students. The incentive to develop ITS comes from educational studies showing that individual tutoring is much more effective than group teaching, in addition to the need for promoting learning on a larger scale. Over the years, a combination of cognitive science and data-driven techniques have enhanced the capabilities of ITS, allowing it to model a wide range of students' characteristics, such as knowledge, emotion, off-task behavior, and wheel spinning. There is ample evidence that ITS are highly effective in helping students learn. ITS can be used to keep students in the zone of proximal development (ZPD): the space wherein students may learn with guidance. Such systems can guide students through tasks slightly above their ability level.

Generative AI gained widespread public attention with the introduction of ChatGPT in November 2022. This caused alarm among K-12 and higher education institutions, with a few large school districts quickly banning GenAI, due to concerns about potential academic misconduct. However, as the debate developed, these bans were largely reversed within a few months. To combat academic misconduct, detection tools have been developed, but their accuracy is limited.

There have been various use cases in education, including providing personalized feedback, brainstorming classroom activities, support for students with special needs, streamlining administrative tasks, and simplifying assessment processes. However, GenAI can output incorrect information, also known as hallucination. Its outputs can also be biased, leading to calls for transparency regarding the data used to train GenAI models and their use. Providing professional development for teachers and developing policies and regulations can help mitigate the ethical concerns of GenAI. And while AI systems can provide individualized instruction and adaptive feedback to students, they have the potential to impact students' sense of classroom community.

== Settings and sectors ==
=== Preschool ===
Various forms of electronic media can be a feature of preschool life. Although parents report a positive experience, the impact of such use has not been systematically assessed.

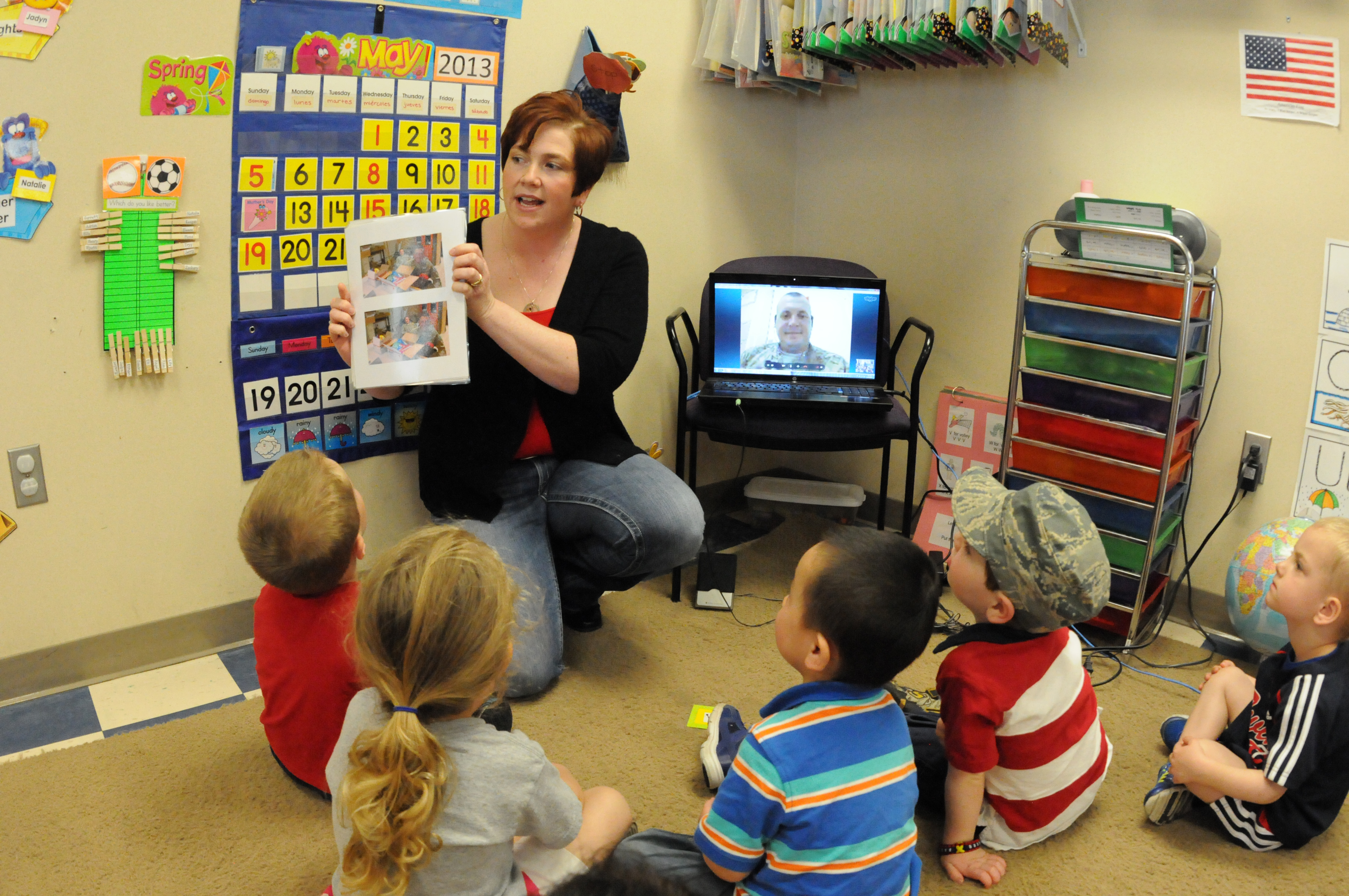
Preschool activity

The age when a given child might start using a particular technology, such as a cellphone or computer, might depend on matching a technological resource to the recipient's developmental capabilities, such as the age-anticipated stages labeled by Swiss psychologist, Jean Piaget. Parameters, such as age-appropriateness, coherence with sought-after values, and concurrent entertainment and educational aspects, have been suggested for choosing media.

At the preschool level, technology can be introduced in several ways. At the most basic is the use of computers, tablets, and audio and video resources in classrooms. Additionally, there are many resources available for parents and educators to introduce technology to young children or to use technology to augment lessons and enhance learning. Some options that are age-appropriate are video- or audio-recording of their creations, introducing them to the use of the internet through browsing age-appropriate websites, providing assistive technology to allow disabled children to participate with the rest of their peers, educational apps, electronic books, and educational videos. There are many free and paid educational website and apps that are directly targeting the educational needs of preschool children. These include Starfall, ABC mouse, PBS Kids Video, Teach me, and Montessori crosswords. Educational technology in the form of electronic books [109] offer preschool children the option to store and retrieve several books on one device, thus bringing together the traditional action of reading along with the use of educational technology. Educational technology is also thought to improve hand-eye coordination, language skills, visual attention, and motivation to complete educational tasks, and allows children to experience things they otherwise would not. There are several keys to making the most educational use of introducing technology at the preschool level: technology must be used appropriately, should allow access to learning opportunities, should include the interaction of parents and other adults with the preschool children, and should be developmentally appropriate. Allowing access to learning opportunities especially for allowing disabled children to have access to learning opportunities, giving bilingual children the opportunity to communicate and learn in more than one language, bringing in more information about STEM subjects, and bringing in images of diversity that may be lacking in the child's immediate environment.

Coding is also becoming part of the early learning curriculum and preschool-aged children can benefit from experiences that teach coding skills even in a screen-free way. There are activities and games that teach hands-on coding skills that prepare students for the coding concepts they will encounter and use in the future. Minecraft and Roblox are two popular coding and programming apps being adopted by institutions that offer free or low-cost access.

=== Primary and secondary ===
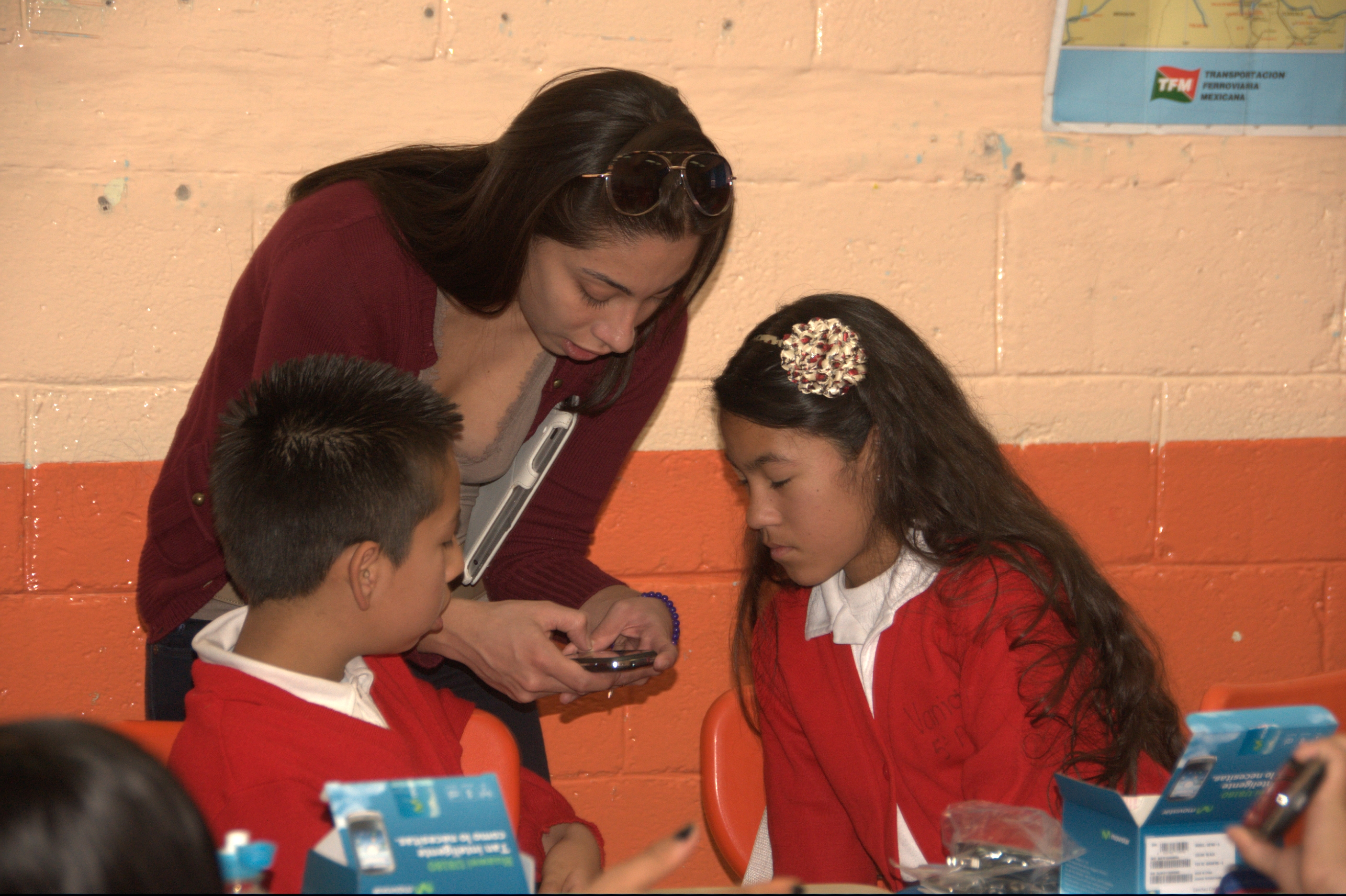
Teacher showing primary school students how to work a program at a primary school in Santa Fe, Mexico City

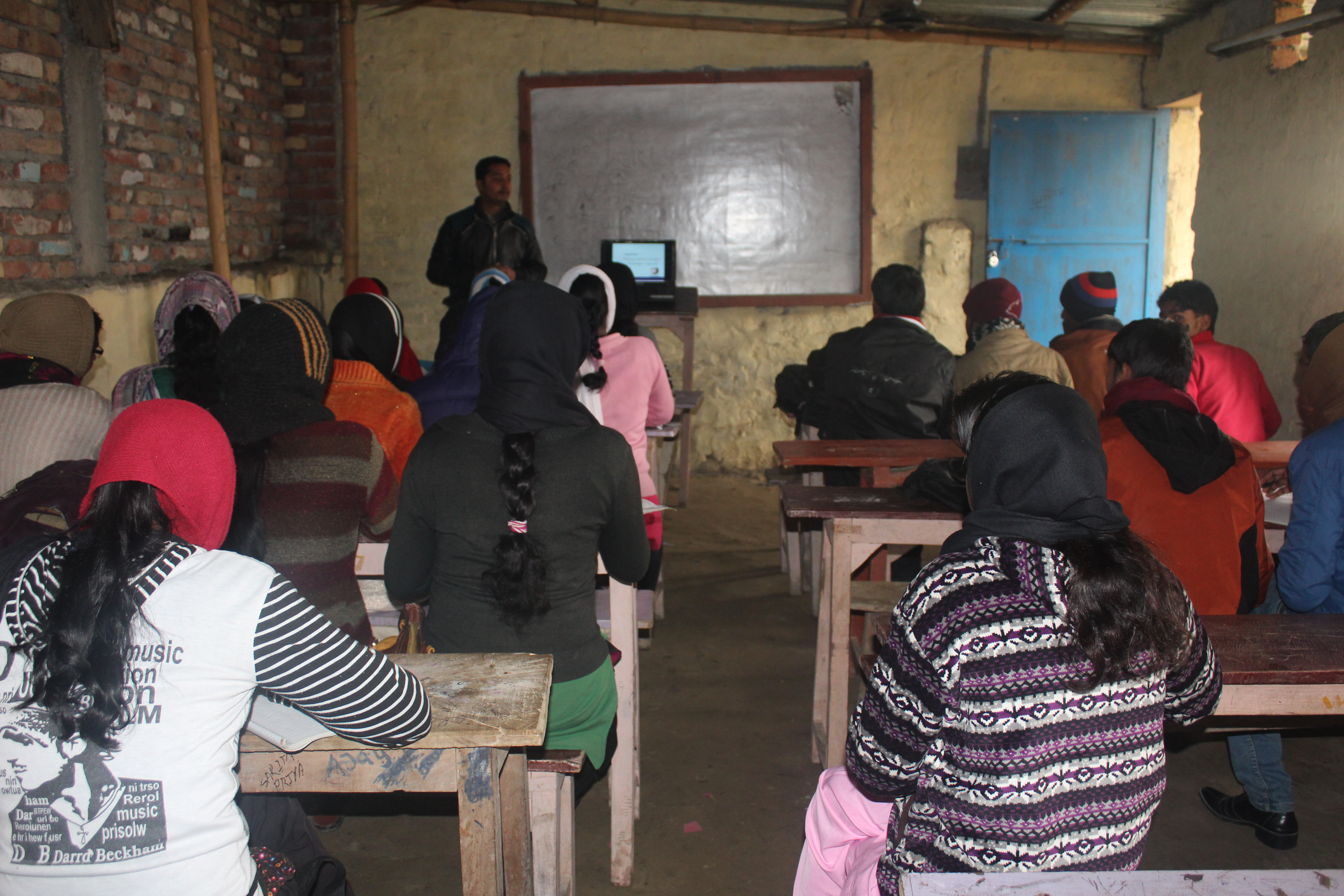
Students at the World Vision Higher Secondary College

E-learning is increasingly being utilized by students who may not want to go to traditional brick-and-mortar schools due to severe allergies or other medical issues, fear of school violence and school bullying, and students whose parents would like to homeschool but do not feel qualified. Online schools create a haven for students to receive a quality education while almost completely avoiding these common problems. Online charter schools also often are not limited by location, income level, or class size in the way brick and mortar charter schools are.

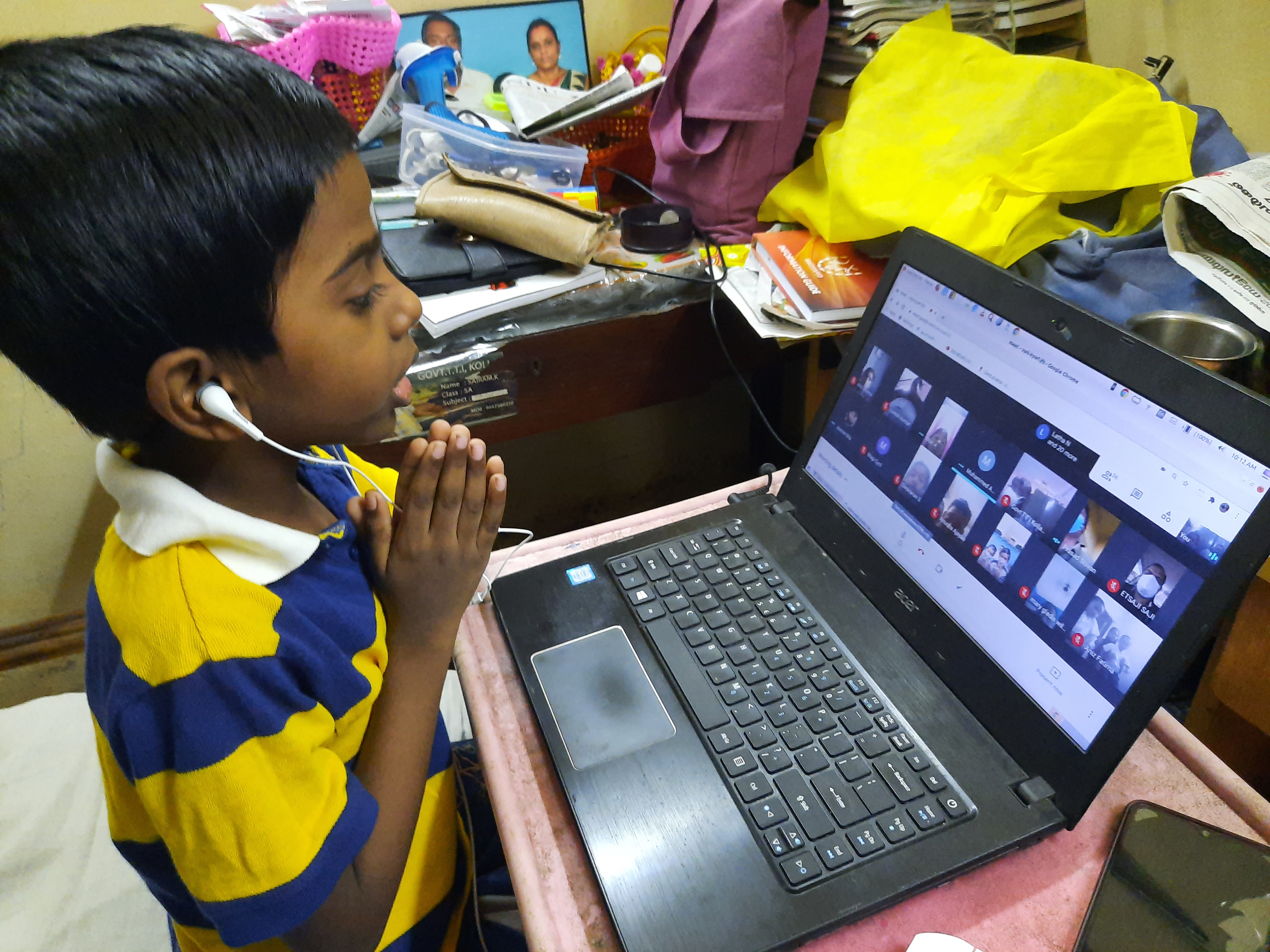
A student attending online class in Kerala, India, during the COVID-19 pandemic

E-learning also has been rising as a supplement to the traditional classroom. Students with special talents or interests outside of the available curricula use e-learning to advance their skills or exceed grade restrictions.

Virtual education in K-12 schooling often refers to virtual schools, and in higher education to virtual universities. Virtual schools are "cybercharter schools" with innovative administrative models and course delivery technology.

Education technology also seems to be an interesting method of engaging gifted youths that are under-stimulated in their current educational program. This can be achieved with after-school programs or even technologically-integrated curricula. 3D printing integrated courses (3dPIC) can also give youths the stimulation they need in their educational journey. Université de Montréal's Projet SEUR in collaboration with Collège Mont-Royal and La Variable are heavily developing this field.

=== Higher education ===
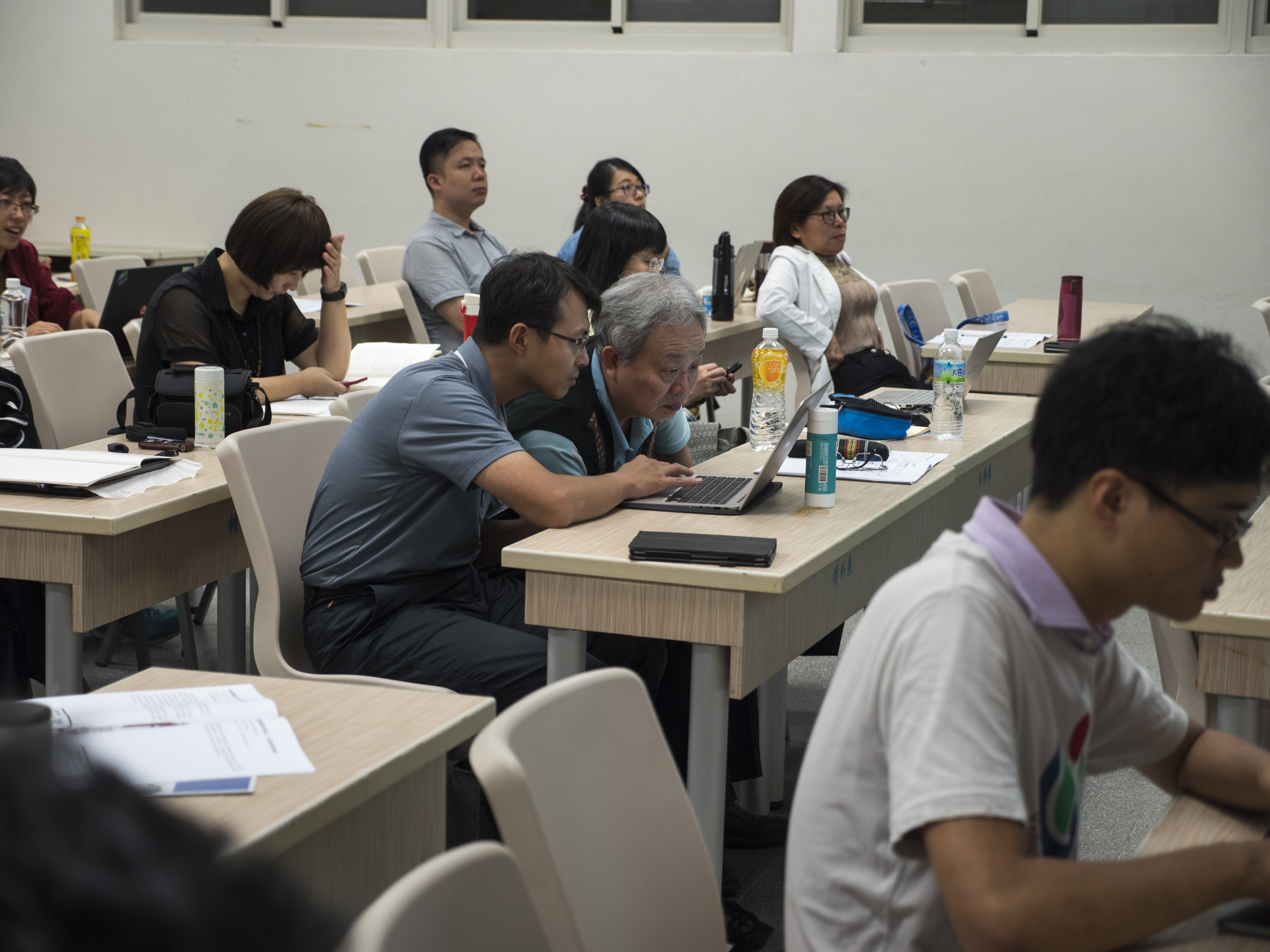
Students using laptops in higher education

Online college course enrollment has seen a 29% increase in enrollment with nearly one-third of all college students, or an estimated 6.7 million students are currently enrolled in online classes. In 2009, 44% of post-secondary students in the US were taking some or all of their courses online, which was projected to rise to 81% by 2014.

Although a large proportion of for-profit higher education institutions now offer online classes, only about half of private, non-profit schools do so. Private institutions may become more involved with online presentations as the costs decrease. Properly trained staff must also be hired to work with students online. These staff members need to understand the content area, and also be highly trained in the use of the computer and Internet. Online education is rapidly increasing, and online doctoral programs have even developed at leading research universities.

Although massive open online courses (MOOCs) may have limitations that preclude them from fully replacing college education, such programs have significantly expanded. MIT, Stanford and Princeton University offer classes to a global audience, but not for college credit. University-level programs, like edX founded by Massachusetts Institute of Technology and Harvard University, offer a wide range of disciplines at no charge, while others permit students to audit a course at no charge but require a small fee for accreditation. MOOCs have not had a significant impact on higher education and declined after the initial expansion, but are expected to remain in some form. Lately, MOOCs are used by smaller universities to profile themselves with highly specialized courses for special-interest audiences, as for example in a course on technological privacy compliance.

MOOCs have been observed to lose the majority of their initial course participants. In a study performed by Cornell and Stanford universities, student-drop-out rates from MOOCs have been attributed to student anonymity, the solitude of the learning experience, and to the lack of interaction with peers and with teachers. Effective student engagement measures that reduce drop-outs are forum interactions and virtual teacher or teaching assistant presence - measures which induce staff cost that grows with the number of participating students.

=== Corporate and professional ===
E-learning is being used by companies to deliver mandatory compliance training and updates for regulatory compliance, soft skills and IT skills training, continuing professional development (CPD), and other valuable workplace skills. Companies with spread out distribution chains use e-learning for delivering information about the latest product developments. Most corporate e-learning is asynchronous and delivered and managed via learning management systems. The big challenge in corporate e-learning is to engage the staff, especially on compliance topics for which periodic staff training is mandated by the law or regulations.

=== Government and public ===
Educational technology is used by governmental bodies to train staff and civil service. Government agencies also have an interest in promoting digital technology use, and improving skills amongst the people they serve.

== Benefits ==
Effective technology use deploys multiple evidence-based strategies concurrently (e.g. adaptive content, frequent testing, immediate feedback, etc.), as do effective teachers. Using computers or other forms of technology can give students practice on core content and skills while the teacher can work with others, conduct assessments, or perform other tasks. Through the use of educational technology, education is able to be individualized for each student allowing for better differentiation and allowing students to work for mastery at their own pace. In India, the National Level Common Entrance Examination (NLCEE) utilized educational technology to provide free online coaching and scholarship opportunities. By leveraging digital platforms during the COVID-19 pandemic, NLCEE ensured students, especially those from underprivileged backgrounds, could access quality education and career guidance remotely.

Modern educational technology can improve access to education, including full degree programs. It enables better integration for non-full-time students, particularly in continuing education, and improved interactions between students and instructors. Learning materials can be used for distance learning and are accessible to a wider audience across geographical boundaries. Course materials are easy to access. In 2010, 70.3% of American family households had access to the internet. In 2013, according to Canadian Radio-Television and Telecommunications Commission Canada, 79% of homes have access to the internet. Students can access and engage with numerous online resources at home. Using online resources can help students spend more time on specific aspects of what they may be learning in school but at home. Schools like the Massachusetts Institute of Technology (MIT) have made certain course materials free online.

Students appreciate the convenience of e-learning, but report greater engagement in face-to-face learning environments. Colleges and universities are working towards combating this issue by utilizing WEB 2.0 technologies as well as incorporating more mentorships between students and faculty members.

According to James Kulik, who studies the effectiveness of computers used for instruction, students usually learn more in less time when receiving computer-based instruction, and they like classes more and develop more positive attitudes toward computers in computer-based classes. Students can independently solve problems. There are no intrinsic age-based restrictions on difficulty level, i.e. students can go at their own pace. Students editing their written work on word processors improve the quality of their writing. According to some studies, the students are better at critiquing and editing written work that is exchanged over a computer network with students they know. Studies completed in "computer intensive" settings found increases in student-centric, cooperative, and higher-order learning, writing skills, problem-solving, and using technology. Attitudes toward technology as a learning tool by parents, students, and teachers have improved over time, but in recent years, concerns about student screentime, easy accessiblity of non-academic distractions and the negative effects of social media have dampened enthusiasm considerably.

Employers' acceptance of online education has risen over time. More than 50% of human resource managers SHRM surveyed for an August 2010 report said that if two candidates with the same level of experience were applying for a job, it would not have any kind of effect whether the candidate's obtained degree was acquired through an online or a traditional school. Seventy-nine percent said they had employed a candidate with an online degree in the past 12 months. However, 66% said candidates who get degrees online were not seen as positively as job applicants with traditional degrees.

The use of educational apps generally has a positive effect on learning. Pre- and post-tests have revealed that the use of educational apps on mobile devices reduces the achievement gap between struggling and average students.

=== Education and technology in developing countries ===
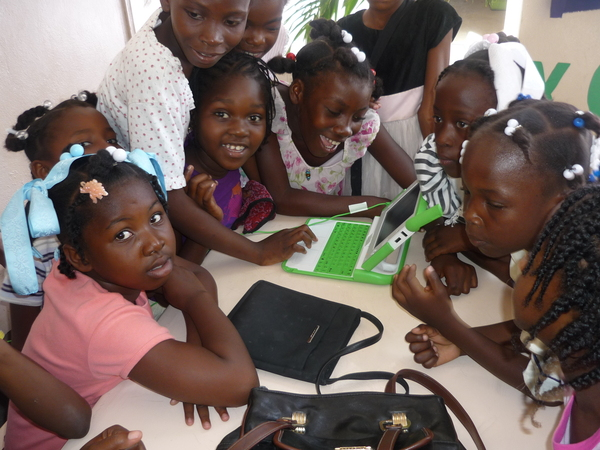
The OLPC laptop being introduced to children in Haiti

The role of educational technology in enhancing access to education, particularly in impoverished areas and developing countries, is increasingly significant. However, it is important to recognise that educational technology is not solely about the integration of education and technology; it is also influenced by the societal culture in which it is implemented.

Various organizations, including charities like One Laptop per Child, are dedicated to providing infrastructures that enable disadvantaged individuals to access educational materials. The OLPC foundation, supported by major corporations and originating from MIT Media Lab, has a mission to develop a $100 laptop for delivering educational software. These laptops have been made widely available since 2008, either sold at cost or distributed through donations.

In developing countries, technology adoption may be limited, but some countries have made progress in implementing pro-technology policies and advancements in biotechnology. One positive outcome of improved technology in these countries is reduced dependence on developed nations. Strategies such as developing infrastructure, promoting entrepreneurship, and formulating open policies towards technology can be effective in enhancing education and economies in developing nations.

In Africa, the New Partnership for Africa's Development (NEPAD) has launched an " e-school program" with the ambitious goal of providing computer equipment, learning materials, and internet access to all 600,000 primary and high schools within a decade. Another notable initiative, nabuur.com, supported by former US President Bill Clinton, utilises the internet to facilitate cooperation among individuals on social development issues.

India is also making advancements in educational technology by implementing initiatives that deliver learning materials directly to students. In 2004, the Indian Space Research Organisation launched EDUSAT, a communications satellite that provides cost-effective access to educational materials, reaching a larger portion of the country's population.

Educational tech (EdTech), encompasses information and communication technology (ICT) and has the potential to address various challenges, such as the absence of teachers, by providing improved lessons, teacher training, and student motivation. In recent years, the cost of educational technology has significantly decreased, making it more accessible even in economically disadvantaged countries. Tablets, for example, can now be purchased for as low as $28, and India offers the most affordable data plans worldwide. This affordability has given rise to new ventures like ExtraClass, which aims to provide affordable education to 260 million children.

== Disadvantages ==
Globally, factors like change management, technology obsolescence, and vendor-developer partnership are major restraints that are hindering the growth of the Educational technology market.

In the US, state and federal government increased funding, as well as private venture capital, has been flowing into the education sector. However, as of 2013, none were looking at technology return on investment (ROI) to connect expenditures on technology with improved student outcomes.

New technologies are frequently accompanied by unrealistic hype and promises regarding their transformative power to change education for the better or to provide better educational opportunities to the masses. Examples include silent film, broadcast radio, and television, none of which have maintained much of a foothold in the daily practices of mainstream formal education. Technology, in and of itself, does not necessarily result in fundamental improvements to educational practice. The focus needs to be on the learner's interaction with technology—not the technology itself. It needs to be recognized as "ecological" rather than "additive" or "subtractive". In this ecological change, one significant change will create total change.

According to Branford et al., "technology does not guarantee effective learning", and inappropriate use of technology can even hinder it. A University of Washington study of infant vocabulary shows that it is slipping due to educational baby DVDs. Published in the Journal of Pediatrics, a 2007 University of Washington study on the vocabulary of babies surveyed over 1,000 parents in Washington and Minnesota. The study found that for every hour that babies 8–16 months of age watched DVDs and videos, they knew 6–8 fewer of 90 common baby words than the babies that did not watch them. Andrew Meltzoff, a surveyor in this study, states that the result makes sense, that if the baby's "alert time" is spent in front of DVDs and TV, instead of with people speaking, the babies are not going to get the same linguistic experience. Dimitri Chistakis, another surveyor reported that the evidence is mounting that baby DVDs are of no value and may be harmful.

Adaptive instructional materials tailor questions to each student's ability and calculate their scores, but this encourages students to work individually rather than socially or collaboratively (Kruse, 2013). Social relationships are important, but high-tech environments may compromise the balance of trust, care, and respect between teacher and student.

Massively open online courses (MOOCs), although quite popular in discussions of technology and education in developed countries (more so in the US), are not a major concern in most developing or low-income countries. One of the stated goals of MOOCs is to provide less fortunate populations (i.e., in developing countries) an opportunity to experience courses with US-style content and structure. However, research shows only 3% of the registrants are from low-income countries, and although many courses have thousands of registered students only 5–10% of them complete the course. This can be attributed to lack of staff support, course difficulty, and low levels of engagement with peers. MOOCs also implies that certain curriculum and teaching methods are superior, and this could eventually wash over (or possibly washing out) local educational institutions, cultural norms, and educational traditions.

With the Internet and social media, using educational apps makes students highly susceptible to distraction and sidetracking. Even though proper use has been shown to increase student performance, being distracted would be detrimental. Another disadvantage is an increased potential for cheating.

A disadvantage of e-learning is that it can cause depression, according to a study made during the 2021 COVID-19 quarantines.

Technologies which are being developed will address different challenges in topics such as education, health and global poverty, but there are cases in which this is not working or the results achieved are far away from the expectations. Kentaro Toyama, in his book Geek Heresy mentions examples in which this happen. He highlights the cases of computers in Bangalore that are locked away because teachers don't know what to do with them and mobile phone apps meant to spread hygiene practices and fail to improve health in Africa. Moreover, these past decades there have been huge improvements in technology which have done little to reduce rising poverty and inequalities, even in developed countries like United States. In addition to this, an interesting example is the one found by the economist Ana Santiago and her colleagues at the Inter-American Development Bank which conclude no educational advantage in a One Laptop per Child program in Peru. Another team of researchers found similar results in Uruguay, and concluded: "Our findings confirm that the technology alone cannot impact learning".

=== Over-stimulation ===
Electronic devices such as cell phones and computers facilitate rapid access to a stream of sources, each of which may receive cursory attention. Michel Rich, an associate professor at Harvard Medical School and executive director of the center on Media and Child Health in Boston, said of the digital generation, "Their brains are rewarded not for staying on task, but for jumping to the next thing. The worry is we're raising a generation of kids in front of screens whose brains are going to be wired differently." Students have always faced distractions; computers and cell phones are a particular challenge because the stream of data can interfere with focusing and learning. Although these technologies affect adults too, young people may be more influenced by it as their developing brains can easily become habituated to switching tasks and become unaccustomed to sustaining attention. Too much information, coming too rapidly, can overwhelm thinking.

Technology is "rapidly and profoundly altering our brains." High exposure levels stimulate brain cell alteration and release neurotransmitters, which causes the strengthening of some neural pathways and the weakening of others. This leads to heightened stress levels on the brain that, at first, boost energy levels, but, over time, actually augment memory, impair cognition, lead to depression, and alter the neural circuitry of the hippocampus, amygdala and prefrontal cortex. These are the brain regions that control mood and thought. If unchecked, the underlying structure of the brain could be altered. Overstimulation due to technology may begin too young. When children are exposed before the age of seven, important developmental tasks may be delayed, and bad learning habits might develop, which "deprives children of the exploration and play that they need to develop." Media psychology is an emerging specialty field that embraces electronic devices and the sensory behaviors occurring from the use of educational technology in learning.

=== Sociocultural criticism ===
According to Lai, "the learning environment is a complex system where the interplay and interactions of many things impact the outcome of learning." When technology is brought into an educational setting, the pedagogical setting changes in that technology-driven teaching can change the entire meaning of an activity without adequate research validation. If technology monopolizes an activity, students can begin to develop the sense that "life would scarcely be thinkable without technology."

Leo Marx considered the word "technology" itself as problematic, susceptible to reification and "phantom objectivity", which conceals its fundamental nature as something that is only valuable insofar as it benefits the human condition. Technology ultimately comes down to affecting the relations between people, but this notion is obfuscated when technology is treated as an abstract notion devoid of good and evil. Langdon Winner makes a similar point by arguing that the underdevelopment of the philosophy of technology leaves us with an overly simplistic reduction in our discourse to the supposedly dichotomous notions of the "making" versus the "uses" of new technologies and that a narrow focus on "use" leads us to believe that all technologies are neutral in moral standing.

Winner viewed technology as a "form of life" that not only aids human activity, but that also represents a powerful force in reshaping that activity and its meaning.

By far, the greatest latitude of choice exists the very first time a particular instrument, system, or technique is introduced. Because choices tend to become strongly fixed in material equipment, economic investment, and social habit, the original flexibility vanishes for all practical purposes once the initial commitments are made. In that sense, technological innovations are similar to legislative acts or political findings that establish a framework for public order that will endure over many generations. (p. 29)

When adopting new technologies, there may be one best chance to "get it right". Seymour Papert (p. 32) points out a good example of a (bad) choice that has become strongly fixed in social habit and material equipment: our "choice" to use the QWERTY keyboard.

Neil Postman endorsed the notion that technology impacts human cultures, including the culture of classrooms, and that this is a consideration even more important than considering the efficiency of new technology as a tool for teaching. Regarding the computer's impact on education, Postman writes (p. 19):

What we need to consider about the computer has nothing to do with its efficiency as a teaching tool. We need to know in what ways it is altering our conception of learning, and how in conjunction with television, it undermines the old idea of school.

There is an assumption that technology is inherently interesting so it must be helpful in education; based on research by Daniel Willingham, that is not always the case. He argues that it does not necessarily matter what the technological medium is, but whether or not the content is engaging and utilizes the medium in a beneficial way.

==== Digital divide ====
The concept of the digital divide is a gap between those who have access to digital technologies and those who do not. Access may be associated with age, gender, socio-economic status, education, income, ethnicity, and geography.

=== Data protection ===
According to a report by the Electronic Frontier Foundation, large amounts of personal data on children are collected by electronic devices that are distributed in schools in the United States. Often, far more information than necessary is collected, uploaded, and stored indefinitely. Aside from name and date of birth, this information can include the child's browsing history, search terms, location data, contact lists, as well as behavioral information. Parents are not informed or, if informed, have little choice. According to the report, this constant surveillance resulting from educational technology can "warp children's privacy expectations, lead them to self-censor, and limit their creativity". In a 2018 public service announcement, the FBI warned that widespread collection of student information by educational technologies, including web browsing history, academic progress, medical information, and biometrics, created the potential for privacy and safety threats if such data was compromised or exploited.

The transition from in-person learning to distance education in higher education due to the COVID-19 pandemic has led to enhanced extraction of student data enabled by complex data infrastructures. These infrastructures collect information such as learning management system logins, library metrics, impact measurements, teacher evaluation frameworks, assessment systems, learning analytic traces, longitudinal graduate outcomes, attendance records, social media activity, and so on. The copious amounts of information collected are quantified for the marketization of higher education, employing this data as a means to demonstrate and compare student performance across institutions to attract prospective students, mirroring the capitalistic notion of ensuring efficient market functioning and constant improvement through measurement. This desire of data has fueled the exploitation of higher education by platform companies and data service providers who are outsourced by institutions for their services. The monetization of student data in order to integrate corporate models of marketization further pushes higher education, widely regarded as a public good, into a privatized commercial sector.

== Teacher training ==
Since technology is not the end goal of education, but rather a means by which it can be accomplished, educators must have a good grasp of the technology and its advantages and disadvantages. Teacher training aims for the effective integration of classroom technology.

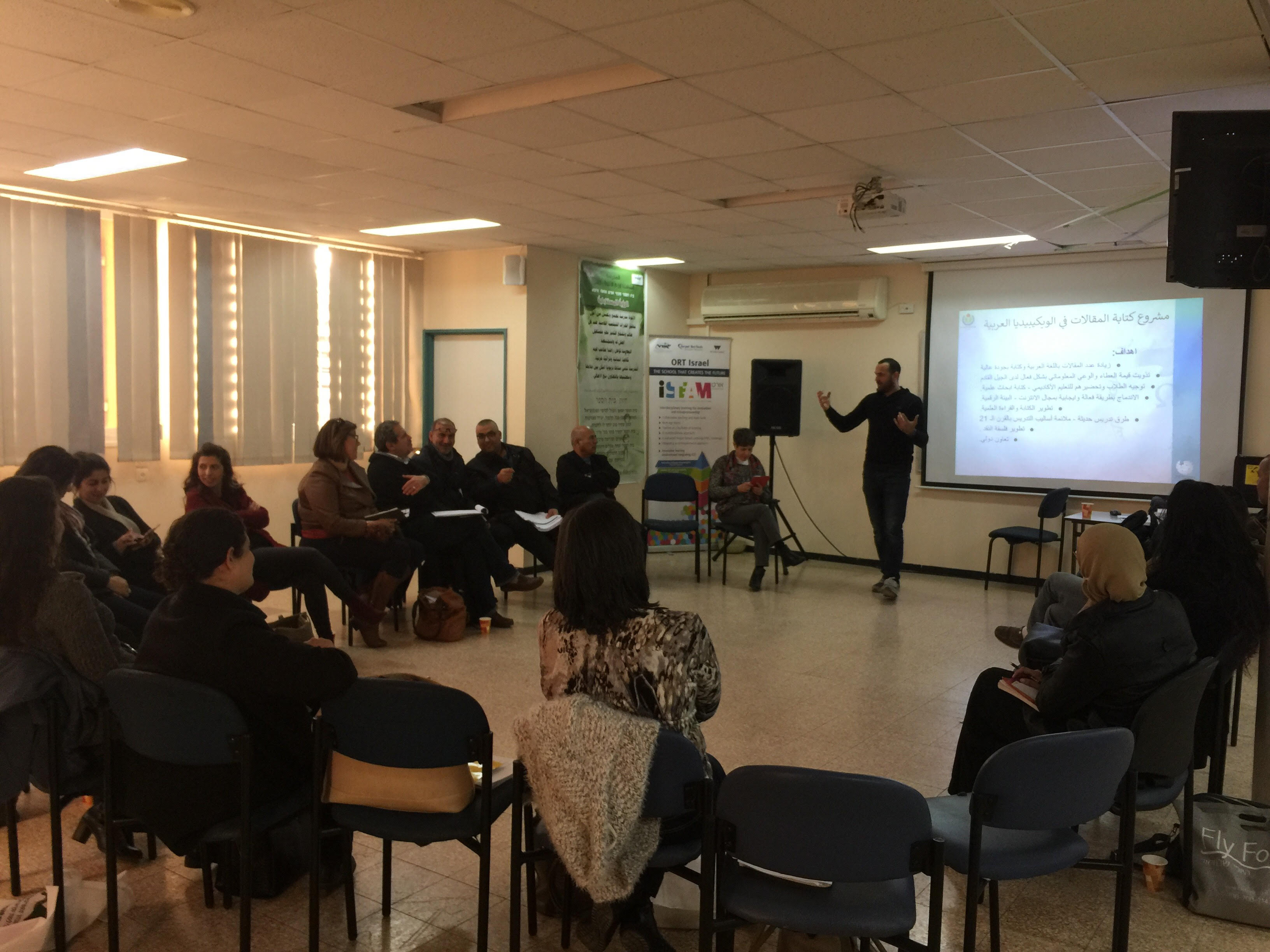
Teacher training in Naura

The evolving nature of technology may unsettle teachers, who may experience themselves as perpetual novices. Finding quality materials to support classroom objectives is often difficult. Random professional development days are inadequate.

According to Jenkins, "Rather than dealing with each technology in isolation, we would do better to take an ecological approach, thinking about the interrelationship among different communication technologies, the cultural communities that grow up around them, and the activities they support." Jenkins also suggested that the traditional school curriculum guided teachers to train students to be autonomous problem solvers. However, today's workers are increasingly asked to work in teams, drawing on different sets of expertise, and collaborating to solve problems. Learning styles and the methods of collecting information have evolved, and "students often feel locked out of the worlds described in their textbooks through the depersonalized and abstract prose used to describe them". These twenty-first-century skills can be attained through the incorporation and engagement with technology. Changes in instruction and use of technology can also promote a higher level of learning among students with different types of intelligence.

== Assessment ==
There are two distinct issues of assessment: the assessment of educational technology and assessment with technology.

Assessments of educational technology have included the Follow Through project.

Educational assessment with technology may be either formative assessment or summative assessment. Instructors use both types of assessments to understand student progress and learning in the classroom. Technology has helped teachers create better assessments to help understand where students who are having trouble with the material are having issues.

Formative assessment is more difficult, as the perfect form is ongoing and allows the students to show their learning in different ways depending on their learning styles. Technology has helped some teachers make their formative assessments better, particularly through the use of a classroom response system (CRS). A CRS is a tool in which the students each have a handheld device that partners up with the teacher's computer. The instructor then asks multiple choice or true or false questions and the students answer on their devices. Depending on the software used, the answers may then be shown on a graph so students and the teacher can see the percentage of students who gave each answer and the teacher can focus on what went wrong.

Learning analytics (LA) is applied to examine the relationship between self-regulated learning (SRL) processes and academic success. By integrating learning management systems with psychological data, like self-efficacy and cognitive strategies, researchers have found correlations between learning practices and success. Studies have shown that students who take part in focused, moderate study sessions and make regular annotations or reflective posts are likely to display greater confidence and higher achievement than those who study for extended sessions without any organized structure. These findings have led to the development of dashboards that use learning analytics, allowing learners to visualize their learning and to reflect metacognitively. This integration of learning analytics and self-regulation theory also helps assess learners.

Classroom response systems have a history going back to the late 1960s and early 1970s, when analogue electronics were used in their implementations. There were a few commercial products available, but they were costly and some universities preferred to build their own. The first such system appears to have been put into place at Stanford University, but it suffered from difficulties in use. Another early system was one designed and built by Raphael M. Littauer, a professor of physics at Cornell University, and used for large lecture courses. It was more successful than most of the other early systems, in part because the designer of the system was also the instructor using it. A subsequent classroom response technologies involved H-ITT with infrared devices.

Summative assessments are more common in classrooms and are usually set up to be more easily graded, as they take the form of tests or projects with specific grading schemes. One huge benefit of tech-based testing is the option to give students immediate feedback on their answers. When students get these responses, they are able to know how they are doing in the class which can help push them to improve or give them confidence that they are doing well. Technology also allows for different kinds of summative assessment, such as digital presentations, videos, or anything else the teacher/students may come up with, which allows different learners to show what they learned more effectively. Teachers can also use technology to post graded assessments online for students to have a better idea of what a good project is.

Electronic assessment uses information technology. It encompasses several potential applications, which may be teacher or student-oriented, including educational assessment throughout the continuum of learning, such as computerized classification testing, computerized adaptive testing, student testing, and grading an exam. E-Marking is an examiner-led activity closely related to other e-assessment activities such as e-testing, or e-learning which are student-led. E-marking allows markers to mark a scanned script or online response on a computer screen rather than on paper.

There are no restrictions on the types of tests that can use e-marking, with e-marking applications designed to accommodate multiple choice, written, and even video submissions for performance examinations. E-marking software is used by individual educational institutions and can also be rolled out to the participating schools of awarding exam organizations. E-marking has been used to mark many well-known high stakes examinations, which in the United Kingdom include A levels and GCSE exams, and in the US includes the SAT test for college admissions. Ofqual reports that e-marking is the main type of marking used for general qualifications in the United Kingdom.

In 2014, the Scottish Qualifications Authority (SQA) announced that most of the National 5 question papers would be e-marked.

In June 2015, the Odisha state government in India announced that it planned to use e-marking for all Plus II papers from 2016.

== Analytics ==
The importance of self-assessment through tools made available on educational technology platforms has been growing. Self-assessment in education technology relies on students analyzing their strengths, weaknesses, and areas where improvement is possible to set realistic goals in learning, improve their educational performances and track their progress. One of the unique tools for self-assessment made possible by education technology is Analytics. Analytics is data gathered on the student's activities on the learning platform, drawn into meaningful patterns that lead to a valid conclusion, usually through the medium of data visualization such as graphs. Learning analytics is the field that focuses on analyzing and reporting data about students' activities in order to facilitate learning.

== Expenditure ==
The five key sectors of the e-learning industry are consulting, content, technologies, services, and support. Worldwide, e-learning was estimated in 2000 to be over $48 billion according to conservative estimates. Commercial growth has been brisk. In 2014, the worldwide commercial market activity was estimated at $6 billion venture capital over the past five years, with self-paced learning generating $35.6 billion in 2011. North American e-learning generated $23.3 billion in revenue in 2013, with a 9% growth rate in cloud-based authoring tools and learning platforms.

== See also ==
- ADDIE Model – Instructional systems design framework
- Assistive technology – Assistive devices for people with disabilities
- Brightstorm – Test preparation website
- Artificial intelligence in education
- Computational education—Computer based education
- Computers in the classroom – Use of computers in school
- Digital media in education – Overview of ICT in education
- Distance education – Mode of delivering education to students who are not physically present
- E-learning (theory) – Cognitive science principles of effective multimedia learning
- Educational animation – Animations produced for the specific purpose of fostering learning
- Educational technology in sub-Saharan Africa – Educational aspect of parts of Africa
- Evidence-based education – Paradigm of the education field
- Intelligent tutoring system – Computer system to provide instruction to learners
- Mobile learning for refugees – Distance education using mobile device technology
- Mobile phone use in schools – The Effects of Cell Phone Use on Student Attention and Learning
- Online credentials for learning
- Qualifications framework § Qualifications frameworks for online learning
- Remote laboratory – Arrangement for conducting experiments at one location while situated at another
- Virtual world language learning
- Web-based simulation
