= Brightstorm =

Test preparation website

- Website type: E-learning
- Founders: Bumsoo Kim, Jeff Marshall, and Chris Walsh
- Website: www.brightstorm.com
- Commercial: Yes
- Launched: 2008
- Current status: Active

Brightstorm was a subscription-based online learning platform that hosted study videos and resources for test preparation.

== History ==
Brightstorm was founded in 2008 by Jeff Marshall, Chris Walsh, and Bumsoo Kim, then investment principal at KTB Ventures. Kim met Marshall and Walsh through KTB while they were developing the idea for the platform, and the three co-founded Brightstorm together. Brightstorm raised $6 million for online video tutorials on topics including SAT prep, AP United States History, and geometry.

== Business model ==
Brightstorm's business model has changed several times throughout the course of its existence. From the launch of its online services in 2008 until August 2009, the course model of its content was subject-oriented. In September 2009, Brightstorm adopted a freemium business model which offered free content in math and science and paid content in test prep for SAT, ACT, and Advanced Placement tests.
