= Michael G. Moore =

Michael Grahame Moore is Distinguished Professor Emeritus of Education at the Pennsylvania State University. He is known for his major contributions to the field of distance education. In 1972, he published his first statement of distance learning theory, which asserted that "distance education is not simply a geographical separation of learners and teachers, but, more importantly, is a pedagogical concept" [1]. Half a century of study, teaching, experimentation and advocacy of distance education justifies a claim that he is the founder of contemporary online education, a claim supported by his inclusion as among the 128 “most important, innovative, influential, innovative and interesting thinkers on education of all time” by Routledge's Encyclopedia of Educational Thinkers [2].

Among M. G. Moore's many contributions, arguably the most significant is his seminal Theory of Transactional Distance [6,3]. The theory describes the relationship between course design (structure), interaction (dialogue), and respect/awareness of individual learner's tolerance for autonomy (self-direction). Essentially, the theory suggests that physical and temporal distance between the learner and the teacher gives rise to pedagogical issues that must be mediated by structure of a course and by the interaction between the learner and the teacher to minimize miscommunication and misunderstanding. The theory contributed significantly to the legitimization and growth of distance learning and teaching online.

== Early career ==
A native of England, Michael G. Moore spent seven years of his early career in East Africa where he developed a belief in the potential of using technology (at that time, especially, in the form of radio broadcasting) to extend university resources to adult learners beyond the university campus. This interest brought Moore to the attention of Charles A. Wedemeyer at the University of Wisconsin, who invited Moore to join him in 1970 as a research assistant. On completing a doctoral degree in 1973, he joined the faculty of St. Francis Xavier University in Antigonish, Canada.

Between 1977 and 1986, Moore was a faculty member at the Open University of the United Kingdom, and during that period was a visiting professor at the University of Wisconsin where he taught graduate seminars related to distance education and independent learners, seminars established by Wedemeyer, and the only graduate courses in the world on this topic at the time. In 1986, Moore returned to the United States to take a position at the Pennsylvania State University. As founder and director of the American Center for the Study of Distance Education he was instrumental in the creation of one of the first social networks for educators, a listserv called Distance Education Online Symposium (DEOS). He organized an annual national research symposium, and designed and taught one of the world's first online courses with students in several countries as well as various locations in the United States, including the world's first full program of online graduate courses in distance education. Having acquired experience as editor of a scholarly journal in England, Moore founded the American Journal of Distance Education (AJDE) in 1987.

== Research ==
During the 1970s, Michael G. Moore's research evolved prior work by Charles Wedemeyer and his own experiences into a cohesive theory of distance education, still referred to at that time as either independent study or correspondence education. His doctoral thesis was titled “Investigation of the Interaction between the Cognitive Style of Field Independence and Attitudes to Independent Study among Adult Learners Who Use Correspondence Independent Study and Self Directed Independent Study" [4]. He wrote:

“It provides a conceptual framework for the field of independent study, in which we have started work on defining the components of the field, and on clarifying the terminology, so that it is now more possible for researchers to develop hypotheses in a systematic fashion, to recognize relationships between projects, to obtain systematic replication and to avoid inadvertent duplication.”

Based on this research he completed the article “Towards a theory of independent learning and teaching” [5] which was published in the Journal of Higher Education. Subsequent work on independent study and learning autonomy eventually led to his Theory of Transactional Distance widely cited as the most significant and, perhaps, only solid theory of distance education[6,7].

During the 1980s, Moore continued to establish himself as a leading scholar with works that included Distance education: A systems view in English, and four other languages [8,9,10]; and the Handbook of Distance Education [13,14]. During the 1990s he focused significantly on applying his knowledge of distance education to problems in developing and emerging countries, with periods as full-time and then part-time consultant at the World Bank, at the International Monetary Fund, UNESCO, UNHCR, and foreign governments, notably Brazil's Ministry of Education and the Ministry of Education in Republic of South Africa. Major assignments included work in Russia, Egypt, Mozambique and Romania as well as consulting in many European countries and American states.

When awarded the honorary degree of Doctor of Athabasca University in 2017 the citation stated: “ One of the founding fathers of distance education, Moore developed central theories and models that informed many that followed. As an active promoter and a talented practitioner of distance education, he has influenced many in both academia and the broader community. He is strongly committed to open education and education for social change and has played a major role in developing distance education programs in Latin America, Scandinavia, Asia and Africa and helped establish programs in other parts of the world.”

In 2020, Moore received an honorary Doctor of Humane Letters from the University of Wisconsin–Madison.
