= Computerworld Smithsonian Award =

- Description: Annual award presented to individuals using technology to produce beneficial changes for society
- Country: United States
- Presented by: Computerworld and the Smithsonian Institution

The Computerworld Smithsonian Award is given out annually to individuals who have used technology to produce beneficial changes for society. Nominees are proposed by a group of 100 CEOs of information technology companies. The award has been given since 1989.

== Winners ==
=== 1989 ===
- 1989 - Inaugural winners, all listed: Bell & Howell's Image Plus Search System; Orangeburg School District 5, Orangeburg, South Carolina; Passaic River Basin Early Flood Warning System, Sierra-Micro Inc.; FIX and FAST, Fidelity Investments; The Missing Children Project, University of Illinois; BI Home Escort System; University of Iowa's National Advanced Driving Simulator; Live Aid, Uplinger Enterprise; The Eyegaze Computer, LC Technologies; American Airlines SABRE Reservation Service; The Innovis DesignCenter.

=== 1992 ===
- 1992 — A Search for New Heroes

=== 1993 ===
- 1993 — Pittsburgh Supercomputing Center, a joint project of Carnegie Mellon University and the University of Pittsburgh together with Westinghouse Electric Corporation, established in 1986 by a grant from the National Science Foundation with support from the Commonwealth of Pennsylvania. Its purpose is to develop and make available state-of-the-art high-performance computing for scientific researchers nationwide.

=== 1994 ===
- 1994 — LOS ALAMOS NATIONAL LABORATORY Parallel Ocean Program (POP)

=== 1995 ===
- 1995 — NEW YORK STOCK EXCHANGE, INC. Integrated Technology Plan
- 1995 - PharMark Corporation, RationalMed

=== 1996 ===
- 1996 — Carnegie Mellon FastLab, a multi-university real time financial trading simulator, for visionary use of information technology in the field of education and academia.

=== 1997 ===
- 1997 — METROPOLITAN TORONTO POLICE, the "Metropolis" program, for technology innovations in policing, including the Computer Aided Dispatch (CAD) system, the automated 911 Emergency Response System, the Computer-Aided Scheduling of Courts system, the Repository of Integrated Computer Images (mugshot) system, the Criminals Information Processing System, the Computer Assisted Reconstruction Enhancement System, and many others

=== 1998 ===
- 1998 — UNIVERSITY OF CALIFORNIA, BERKELEY'S SEARCH FOR EXTRATERRESTRIAL INTELLIGENCE (SETI) PROGRAM
- 1998 - William E. Kelvie, Fannie Mae, the first internet originated mortgage
- 1998 - Mark R. Basile, Incredible Card Corporation, digital biometric emergency health security and retrieval system
- 1998 - Home Automated Living, Tim Shriver, voice-activated home automation control software

=== 1999 ===
- 1999 — Virtual Operating Room, Larry Magid, founder of SafeKids.com and SafeTeens.com

=== 2000 ===
- 2000 — EBay, Montgomery County Public Schools, Department of Primary Industry and Fisheries, Proton World, Independent Electoral Commission of South Africa, Danfoss Drives, National Marrow Donor Program, RealNetworks, Hawkes Ocean Technology, Delta Air Lines, Blackboard Inc., ROGER MAHABIR, CIO, ROYAL BANK OF CANADA DOMINION SECURITIES for advanced internet security techniques support the buying and selling of foreign currencies over the internet, supporting billions of dollars of business in the first year of operation.

==== Case Study Institutions ====
Australia: Commonwealth Science and Industry Research Organisation; National Library of Australia; National Museum of Australia, Research Library University of New South Wales; Austria: Vienna University; Belgium: University of Ghent; Brazil: Biblioteca Nacional Centro; Ministerio da Ciencia e Tecnologia; Programa Comunidade Solidaria-Unidade de Gerencia do Programa; Universidade de São Paulo; Canada: University of Toronto; University of Waterloo; Chile: University of Chile, Santiago; China: Chinese Academy of Sciences; Institute of Science and Technology Information of China; Tsinghua University; Colombia: Colombian Institute for the Development of Science & Technology; Czech Republic: Academy of Science of the Czech Republic; Denmark: Technical University of Denmark; Ecuador: Banco Central del Ecuador; Egypt: American University in Cairo; Finland: Helsinki University of Technology; France: Conservatoire National des Arts et Metiers; La Cité des Sciences et de l'Industrie; National Institute for Research in Computer Science and Control; Germany: Deutsches Museum, Munich; Frankfurt Museum of Applied Arts; Heinz Nixdorf Museum; Guatemala: Secretaria de Planificacion y Programacion; Hong Kong: Hong Kong Baptist University Library; India: Cognizant Corporate Library; Indian Institute of Management, Ahmedabad; Indian Institute of Management, Lucknow; Indian Institute of Technology, Bombay; Institute for Development and Research in Banking Technology; University of Madras; Indonesia: Bandung Institute of Technology; Ireland: Trinity College Dublin; Italy: Centro Cefriel; Japan: Himeji Institute of Technology; Kenya: Kenyatta University; Malaysia: Universiti Teknologi MARA; Netherlands: National Research Institute for Mathematics & Computer Science; University of Amsterdam Computer Museum; New Zealand: University of Auckland; Nigeria: University of Lagos; Norway: Norwegian University of Technology and Science; Peru: Consejo Nacional de Ciencia y Tecnologia; Philippines: University of the Philippines Manila; Russia: Russian Academy of Science; St. Petersburg State Technical University; Singapore: Singapore Polytechnic University; South Africa: Castle of Good Hope; Sweden: Royal Institute of Technology; Switzerland: Ecole Polytechnique Fédérale de Lausanne; ICARE Research Institute in Computing and Telematics; University of Zurich, Z-Link; Taiwan: National Taiwan University of Science and Technology; Thailand: King Mongkut's University Technology Thonburi; Turkey: Middle East Technical University	United Kingdom: Imperial College of Science, Technology and Medicine; Museum of the History of Science; The British Library; The Royal Society; University College London; University of Cambridge, Whipple Collection; University of Oxford, Bodleian Library; University of Sussex; United States: Arizona State University; Brown University, John D. Rockefeller Library; California Institute of Technology; Carnegie Museum; Case Western Reserve University; Computer History Museum, California; DePauw University; Duke University; Emory University; Georgia Institute of Technology; Harvard University, Technology and Entrepreneurship Center; Howard University; Institute for Operations Research and the Management Sciences; Internet Public Library; Louisiana State University; Massachusetts Institute of Technology; Michigan State University; Minnesota State University; Museum of Science and Industry, Chicago; Museum of Science, Boston; New Jersey Institute of Technology; New York Hall of Science; New York Institute of Technology; Northern Michigan University; Ohio State University; Pepperdine University; Princeton University; Purdue University; Rice University; Rutgers University; St. John's University; St. Mary's Episcopal School, Memphis; Smithsonian Institution National Museum of American History; Smithsonian Institution National Air and Space Museum; South Dakota State University; Stanford University; State of Florida Library; Thomas Jefferson Foundation, Jefferson Library; United Way of Massachusetts Bay; University of California at Berkeley; University of Cincinnati; University of Colorado; University of Connecticut; University of Dayton; University of Florida; University of Georgia; University of Houston, College of Technology; University of Kentucky; University of Michigan; University of Minnesota; University of Missouri; University of North Carolina; University of North Carolina, Kenan-Flager Business School; University of Pittsburgh; University of San Diego; University of South Carolina; University of Virginia; University of Washington; University of Wisconsin; University of Wyoming; Virginia Tech University; Washington State University; Wesleyan University; Western Carolina University; Yale University; Venezuela: Universidad Simon Bolivar

== See also ==
- List of awards for contributions to society
