= Synchronous learning =

Type of learning event

Synchronous learning refers to a learning event in which a group of students are engaging in learning at the same time. Before learning technology allowed for synchronous learning environments, most online education took place through asynchronous learning methods. Since synchronous tools that can be used for education have become available, many people are turning to them as a way to help decrease the challenges associated with transactional distance that occurs in online education. Several case studies that found that students are able to develop a sense of community over online synchronous communication platforms. While many online educational programs started out as and with the advent of web conferencing tools, people can learn at the same time in different places as well. For example, use of instant messaging or live chat, webinars and video conferencing allow for students and teachers to collaborate and learn in real time.

== Practical applications ==
A lecture is an example of synchronous learning in a face-to-face environment, because learners and teachers are all in the same place at the same time. Another example of a synchronous learning event would involve students watching a live web stream of a class, while simultaneously taking part in a discussion. Synchronous learning can be facilitated by having students and instructors participate in a class via a web conferencing tool. These synchronous experiences can be designed to develop and strengthen instructor-student and student-student relationships, which can be a challenge in distance learning programs.

== History ==
Synchronous communication in distance education began long before the advent of the use of computers in synchronous learning. After the very early days of distance education, when students and instructors communicated asynchronously via the post office, synchronous forms of communication in distance education emerged with broadcast radio and television. However, it was not until the 1980s, with video-conferencing and interactive television, that students could ask questions and discuss concepts while seeing participants in a synchronous setting. Manifestations of interactive multimedia, the Internet, access to Web-based resources, to synchronous and asynchronous forms of computer mediated communication followed in the 1990s (Bernard, et al., 2005; Simonson, et al., 2012, p. 37).

== See also ==
- Asynchronous learning
- Blended learning
- E-learning
