= StudySoup =

Online marketplace for students

StudySoup is a digital learning marketplace that provides the purchase and sale of academic content, such as course notes, study guides, and tutoring services.

== Background ==
Sieva Kozinsky, an environmental studies graduate from UC Santa Barbara, got the idea for the company while he was a student, after finding it difficult to take notes fast enough to keep up with lectures. Kozinsky, along with Jeff Silverman, started StudySoup in 2014 to source academic support through peer-to-peer learning and provide a means for students to earn money while in school.

== History ==
Within one year of its release, StudySoup had 1.5 million users across the United States. The platform expanded internationally in 2016 to countries such as Singapore and Canada. Several concerns about the legitimacy of StudySoup arose due to its changing business model.

== Controversy ==
StudySoup has a history of using the imagery and logos of universities without permission. Florida State University has issued warnings to its students about StudySoup using FSU’s logo without the school‘s permission.
