= Virtual Operating Room =

Virtual OR
- Company type: Limited liability company
- Website type: Video hosting service
- Available in: English
- Headquarters: Tampa, Florida, {{{location_country}}}
- Area served: Worldwide
- Owners: Virtual OR, LLC
- Founder: Robert R. Lazzara and Thomas Overbey
- Website: Formerly, virtual-or.com
- Current status: Absorbed by Swedish Medical Center

The Virtual Operating Room (Virtual OR) was a company based in Tampa, Florida that broadcast live surgical operations over the internet. It was the first company of its kind to create web-based educational video content that was accessible from anywhere in the world, which earned it a Computerworld Smithsonian Award in 1999 for using technology to benefit the world.

The company's clients included hospitals, medical technology experts, and educational companies. Surgeries were used to share innovations, for teaching purposes, and for marketing new surgical technology.

== History ==
In 1998 Virtual OR was the first entity to live broadcast an open heart surgery over the internet, out of Providence Seattle Medical Center, which became part of Swedish Medical Center in 2000.

In August 2004, Robert R. Lazzara incorporated the company in Florida with co-founder Thomas Overbey who served as Producer and marketed the company.
