= Transactional distance =

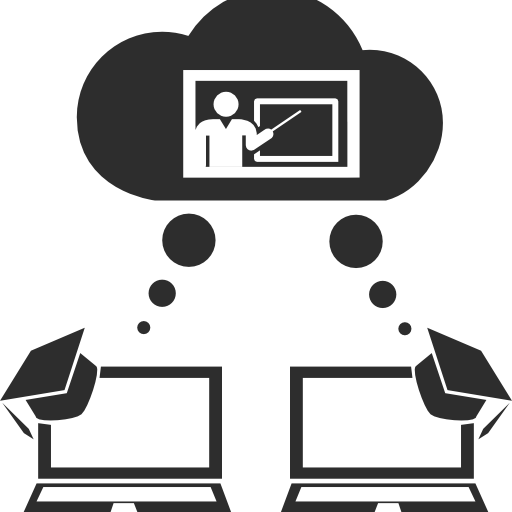

Transactional distance theory was developed in the 1970s by Dr. Michael G. Moore, Distinguished Professor Emeritus of Education at the Pennsylvania State University (Moore, 1980). It is the first pedagogical theory specifically derived from analysis of teaching and learning conducted through technology as opposed to the many theories developed in the classroom. It is considered by some to be one of the few, if not the only, theory in distance education that can be used to test hypotheses. It can be used to frame experiments in tutoring or other learner support activities to assess what change there is in the outcomes of student learning, often judged by student completion (Tait, 2017). Like any theory, the transactional distance model serves as a heuristic device, a means of identifying questions for research and also a very practical instrument to be used in making these difficult instructional design decisions.

== Description ==
The theory consists of a set of principles and a model that defines the pedagogical aspects of education (as contrasted with others such as management and policy) in three sets of variables. The first set consists of elements describing the structure of what is designed to be learned, the second in the interaction or dialog between teacher and learners when that structured program is implemented, and the third is the idiosyncrasies of each individual learner with priority given to the potential self-management or autonomy of the students who interact with teachers within the designed structure (Moore & Kearsley, 2012).

Transactional distance theory states that when an instructional designer makes decisions, these decisions will result in a certain amount of structure, dialog and autonomy. These amounts can be either unwitting consequences of the instructional design process, or the result of conscious instructional design decisions. Regardless, these variables interact to create transactional distance which Michael G. Moore defines as “a psychological and communication space to be crossed, a space of potential misunderstanding between the inputs of instructor and those of the learner.” Thus, the utility of the theory is that it provides guidance to instructional designers as to how to design the course: e.g. how much structure, dialog, and autonomy to build into the course, so as to minimize transactional distances and thereby maximize learning outcomes.

== Measuring transactional distance ==
A number of researchers have used Moore's theory as the theoretical underpinning for the development of a number of statistically valid and reliable scales to measure transactional distances. Some of these are listed below together with a brief description.

Zhang’s Scale of Transactional Distance (2003): By the turn of the millennium, distance education had evolved from being synonymous with correspondence courses to being largely web-based. Aixu (Monica) Zhang built on Michael G. Moore's theory by proposing that transactional distance could be viewed as a measure of the student's difficulty in becoming actively engaged with their online learning environment. She defined transactional distance by four sets of variables (the Transactional Distance between Students and Students (TDSS), the Transactional Distance between Students and the Teacher (TDST), the Transactional Distance between the Student and the Content (TDSC), and the Transactional Distance between the Student and the Instructional Technology (TDSI). She found that these four sets of variables were highly and statistically correlated with Student Satisfaction, which she adopted as her surrogate measure for Transactional Distance. Her work lead to a 31 element statistically reliable and significant Scale of Transactional Distance.

Relative Proximity Theory (Swart et al., 2013): Zhang's Scale of Transactional Distance provides a numerical measure for transactional distance based on a five-point Likert Scale. Such a measure assumes meaning only when compared to another similar measure such as, for example, in a statistical pre –post intervention comparison. Many studies do not lend themselves to pre-post intervention comparisons. Relative Proximity Theory borrows from gap, or needs analysis (Kaufman & Guerra, 2013) to yield the transactional distance between an actual and desired state. For example, the transactional distance between an actual class and an ideal class.

Revised Scale of Transactional Distance (Paul et al., 2015): There are many changes in the educational environment that have occurred since Zhang developed her Scale of Transactional Distance: Online education is the fastest growing segment of higher education, mobile computing has become ubiquitous, MOOC's provide an unprecedented amount of online content to learners and instructors alike. Zhang's model was re-evaluated in light of these changes. The results provided a 12 element parsimonious version of Zhang's scale which has excellent factorial validity and reliability, yields better fit statistics, and is easier and less time consuming to apply than the original scale.

Coll-TD Scale (Wengrowicz et al., 2014): This scale builds on Michael G. Moore's Theory of Transactional Distance to measure the transactional distances of students who are conducting research in virtual group collaborative environments. It defines Transactional Distance as composed of six sets of variables (Communication between Peers, Understanding between Peers, Communication between Peers and Instructor, Understanding between Peers and Instructor, Prior Attitude toward Collaboration, and Satisfaction). This yielded a 40 element statistically reliable and valid instrument.

Coll-TD/F Scale (Swart et al., 2015): This instrument extends the Coll-TD Scale to Flipped Classrooms where collaboration takes place both f2f, during interactive group learning sessions, and outside class (virtual or f2f) during collaboration on projects or take home exams. This 46 element scale was also shown to be statistically valid and reliable.
