= CompuHigh =

Online high school

- United States

Information
- Type: Private, online high school
- Established: 1994

CompuHigh is a private, accredited, online high school established in 1994. CompuHigh provides individual courses as well as a diploma program called Whitmore School. CompuHigh is accredited by AdvancED (formerly known as NCA CASI and SACS CASI). CompuHigh serves national U.S. and international English-speaking students in grades 9–12. CompuHigh has open, year-round enrollment and is self-paced.

CompuHigh offers core and elective courses that are taught by instructors using a mastery learning methodology. Instruction is completely one-on-one between instructor and student, and is largely asynchronous. Instruction, interaction, coursework, and grading takes place on CompuHigh's proprietary learning management system (LMS)
