= Asynchronous learning =

Learning that occurs on each individual student's time

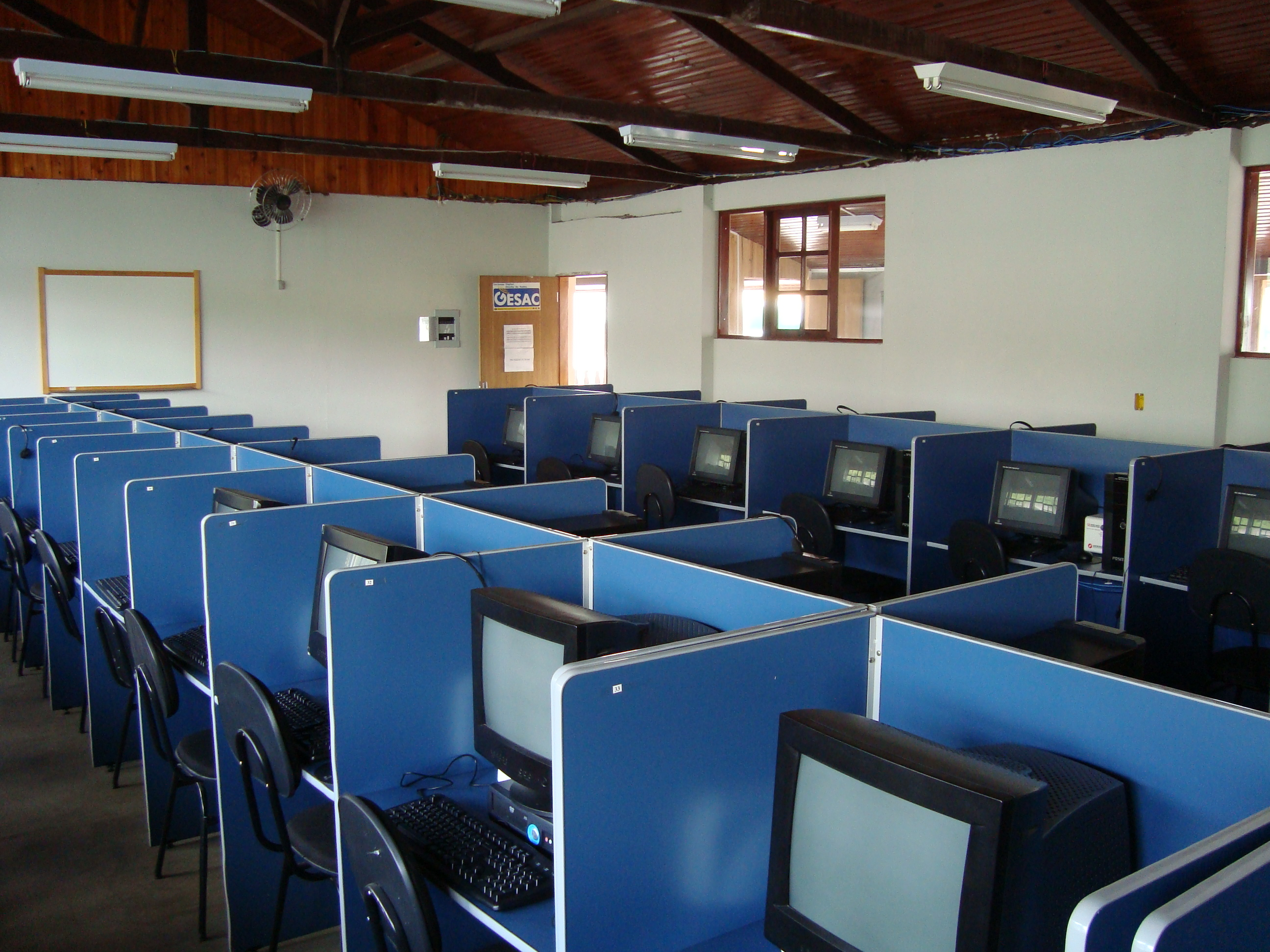
A computer lab which may be utilised to facilitate asynchronous learning

Asynchronous learning is a general term used to describe forms of education, instruction, and learning that do not occur in the same place or at the same time. It uses resources that facilitate information sharing outside the constraints of time and place among a network of people. In many instances, well-constructed asynchronous learning is based on constructivist theory, a student-centered approach that emphasizes the importance of peer-to-peer interactions. This approach combines self-study with asynchronous interactions to promote learning, and it can be used to facilitate learning in traditional on-campus education, distance education, and continuing education. This combined network of learners and the electronic network in which they communicate are referred to as an asynchronous learning network.

Online learning resources that can be used to support asynchronous learning include email, electronic mailing lists, threaded conferencing systems, online discussion boards, wikis, and blogs. Course management systems have been developed to support online interaction, allowing users to organize discussions, post and reply to messages, and upload and access multimedia. These asynchronous forms of communication are sometimes supplemented with synchronous components, including text and voice chat, telephone conversations, videoconferencing, and meetings in virtual spaces such as Second Life, where discussions are facilitated among groups of students.

== History ==
The roots of asynchronous learning are in the end of the 19th century, when formalized correspondence education (or distance learning) first took advantage of the postal system to bring physically remote learners into the educational fold. The 1920s and 1930s saw the introduction of recorded audio, desynchronizing broadcasting and revolutionizing the mass dissemination of information. The first significant distribution of standardized educational content took place during World War II; the branches of the US military produced hundreds of training films, with screenings numbering in the millions.

Online asynchronous learning began with schools' and universities' substantial investment in computer technology in the early 1980s. With seminal applications such as Seymour Papert's Logo programming language, students were able to learn at their own pace, free from the synchronous constraints of a classroom lecture. As computers entered more households and schools began connecting to the nascent Internet, asynchronous learning networks began to take shape. These networks augmented existing classroom learning and led to a new correspondence model for solitary learners.

Using the web, students could access resources online and communicate asynchronously using email and discussion boards. The 1990s saw the arrival of the first telecampuses, with universities offering courses and entire degree plans through a combination of synchronous and asynchronous online instruction. Advancements in multimedia and interactivity have increased the effectiveness of asynchronous learning networks, reducing the distinction between content creators and consumers. Tools such as class blogs and wikis provide enhanced opportunities for asynchronous interaction and learning.

== Development of an asynchronous community ==
Though the social relationships integral to group learning can be developed through asynchronous communication, this development tends to take longer than in traditional, face-to-face settings. The establishment of an asynchronous community takes time and effort and tends to follow a projected course of five stages, as described by Waltonen-Moore et al.:

1. Introductions – This might include a full biography or a short "getting-to-know-you" questions. Through this step, community members begin to see one another as human beings and begin to make a preliminary, emotive connection with the other members of the community. This step is often characterized by emotive or extravagant language and represents group members' attempts to make themselves known as living individuals behind the emotionless technology medium.
2. Identify with the group – Members begin to communicate with one another by reference to their commonalities as group members and seek to either establish or make known norms for successful membership. If this sense of group identity is not established, the likelihood of poor participation or attrition increases.
3. Interact – Members will start interacting with one another in reference to the community's established focus and begin to share information with one another. If the community is an online learning course, then students will begin to discuss course content.
4. Group cohesion and individual reflection – members of the group will begin to validate one another's ideas and opinions while, at the same time, being reflective of their own.
5. Expansive questioning – Now feeling completely comfortable within the environment, focused upon the content, and respectful of other group members' thoughts and experiences, members will begin to not only post facts and deeply held beliefs, but will actually start to "think out loud", allowing other group members to take part in their personal meaning-making and self-directed inquiry.

Asynchronous communities that progress efficiently through these stages tend to share at least three common attributes:

First, the community has an active facilitator who monitors, guides, and nurtures the discourse. Unguided communities tend to have difficulty progressing beyond the second stage of development, because group members can become distracted from the community's intended purpose.

Second, rather than seeking to take on the role of an instructor or disseminator of knowledge, the facilitator recognizes that knowledge is an individual construct that is developed through interaction with other group members. Thus, facilitators within successful communities tend not to be pedantic, but supportive.

And third, successful asynchronous communities permit a certain amount of leniency for play within their discourse. That is, communities that insist upon being overly stringent on etiquette and make no room for the social development that comes from play seem to drive away participants. Rather than enriching discourse on the targeted topic, such attitudes have a negative impact on group identity development and individual comfort levels which will, in turn, decrease overall involvement.

== Roles of instructors and learners ==
Online learning often entails a transition from teacher-centered instruction to student-centered approaches, with instructors taking on multiple instructional and facilitative roles. The constructivist theory that supports asynchronous learning demands that instructors become more than dispensers of knowledge; it requires that they become instructional designers, facilitators, and assessors of both grades and their teaching methods.

As instructional designers, emphasis is placed on establishing the curriculum, methods and the media through which the content will be effectively delivered. Once the design is in place and executed, the instructor must then facilitate the communication and direct the learning. Instructors typically have to be proficient with elements of electronic communication, as asynchronous courses are reliant on email and discussion board communications and the instruction methods are reliant on virtual libraries of e-documents, graphics, and audio files. Establishing a communal spirit is vital, requiring much time commitment from the instructor, who must spend time reading, assessing, reinforcing, and encouraging the interaction and learning that is happening.

The student-centered nature of asynchronous online learning requires students to be actively involved with and take more responsibility for their own learning. In addition to their normal duties as learners, students are required to:

- Become proficient with the technology required for the course;
- Use new methods of communication with both peers and instructors;
- Strengthen their interdependency through collaboration with their peers.

== Strengths ==
Asynchronous learning's greatest benefit to students is the freedom it gives them to access the course and its instructional materials at any time they choose, and from any location, with an Internet connection. This allows for accessibility for diverse student populations, ranging from traditional, on-campus students, to working professionals, to international students in foreign countries.

Asynchronous learning environments provide a "high degree of interactivity" between participants who are separated both geographically and temporally and afford students many of the social benefits of face-to-face interaction. Since students can express their thoughts without interruption, they have more time to reflect on and respond to class materials and their classmates than in a traditional classroom.

Research shows that the time required to initially design an asynchronous course is comparable to that of a traditional synchronous course. However, most asynchronous courses have the potential to reach far more students than a traditional course and course-wide updates or modifications can be disseminated far more quickly and efficiently than traditional lecture models.

Schifter notes that a perceived additional workload is a significant barrier to faculty participation in distance education and asynchronous learning, but that perception can be mitigated through training and experience with teaching in these environments.

Asynchronous learning, and many synchronous online learning environments, often provide a record of instructional activities. Materials, communications, and interactions may be electronically archived, enabling participants to review lectures, presentations, and correspondence. Access to these records is typically available to course participants.

== Shortcomings ==
Asynchronous learning environments pose several challenges for instructors, institutions, and students. Course development and initial setup can be costly. Institutions must provide a computer network infrastructure, including servers, audio/visual equipment, software, and the technical support needed to develop and maintain asynchronous learning environments. Technical support includes initial training and setup, user management, data storage and recovery, as well as hardware repairs and updates. Research indicates faculty members who are hesitant to teach in asynchronous learning environments are so because of a lack of technical support provided by their institutions. However, for faculty to teach successfully in an asynchronous learning environment, they must be technically adept and comfortable enough with the technological tools to optimize their use. According to a recent case study in India, asynchronous learning during COVID-19 pandemic is quite stressful among students because it placed more responsibilities and made students feel frustrated and insecure.

To participate in asynchronous learning environments, students must also have access to computers and the Internet. Although personal computers and web access are becoming more and more pervasive every day, this requirement can be a barrier to entry for many students and instructors. Students must also have the computer/technology skills required to participate in the asynchronous learning program.

== See also ==
- Blended learning
- E-learning
- Educational technology
- Networked learning
- Synchronous learning
- Augmented learning
- Asynchronous conferencing
