= Srinivasan Ramachandran =

Indian biologist and bioinformatician

- Born: India
- Education: St. Xavier's College, Kolkata; University of Calcutta; Jawaharlal Nehru University
- Known for: Studies on data analytics
- Awards: 2007 N-BIOS Prize
- Scientific career
- Fields: Integrative Bioinformatics
- Workplaces: Institute of Genomics and Integrative Biology; IIT Delhi

Srinivasan Ramachandran is an Indian biologist, bioinformatician and a senior principal scientist at the department of genome analysis of the Institute of Genomics and Integrative Biology. Known for his studies in the field of data analytics, Ramachandran is also an adjunct faculty, senior principal scientist and AcSIR Professor at the Faculty of Biological Sciences of the Indian Institute of Technology, Delhi. The Department of Biotechnology of the Government of India awarded him the National Bioscience Award for Career Development, one of the highest Indian science awards, for his contributions to biosciences in 2007.

== Biography ==
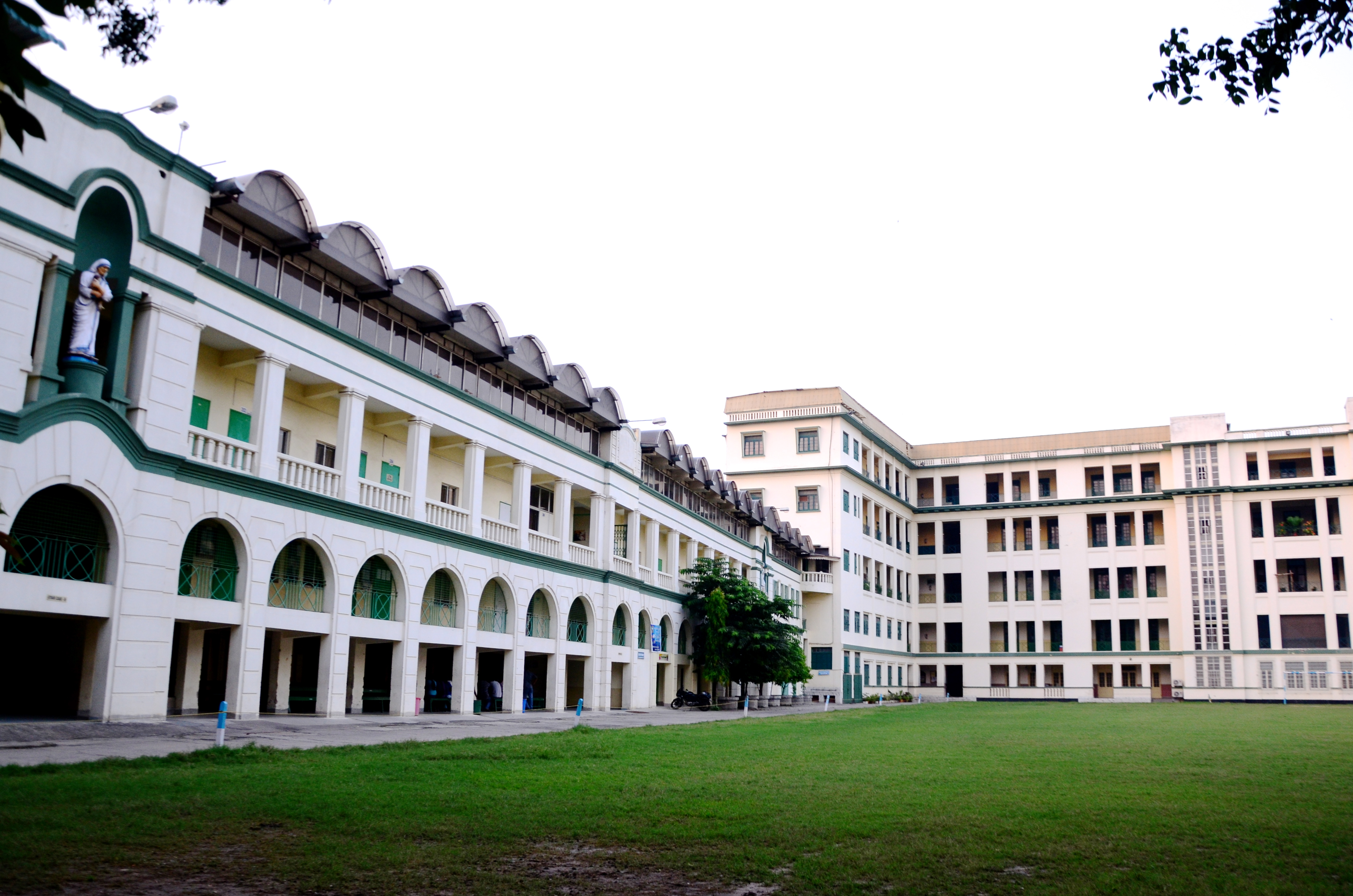
St. Xavier's College.

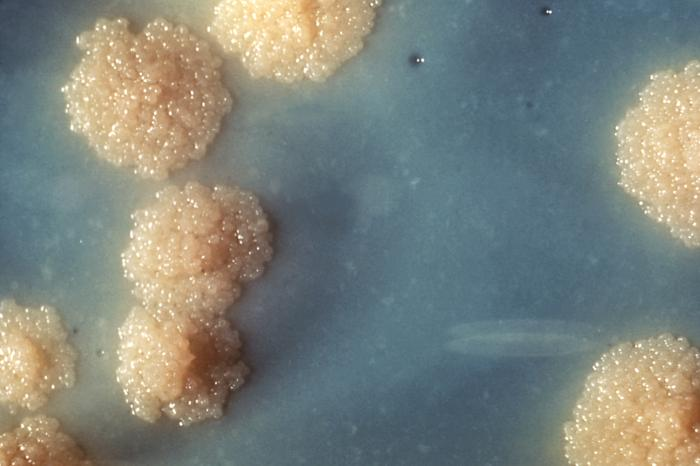
M. tuberculosis bacterial colonies

S. Ramachandran did his undergraduate studies at the St. Xavier's College, Kolkata and after earning a BSc (honors) degree from the University of Calcutta, he completed post graduate studies at Jawaharlal Nehru University (JNU) in biotechnology. Continuing at JNU, he secured a PhD in 1993 and started his career by joining the Institute of Genomics and Integrative Biology (IGIB) where he serves as a senior principal scientist at the department of genome analysis. He also serves as an adjunct faculty and principal scientist at the faculty of biological sciences of the University of Calcutta, holding the position of a professor of Academy of Scientific and Innovative Research (AcSIR).

Ramachandran's research is in the field of informative bioinformatics and he leads a group of scientists engaged in integrative immunoinformatics, architecture of gene co-expression and flux modeling. He is credited with the discovery of new virulence factors in Mycobacterium tuberculosis, which was accomplished using computational analysis; the studies were subsequently verified through experiments. He is the co-developer of SPAAN, a genome informatics software and has contributed to the development of OSDDlinux, a customized computer operating system for drug discovery. His studies have been documented by way of a number of articles (Note: Please see Selected bibliography section) and ResearchGate, an online repository of scientific articles has listed 115 of them. Besides he has delivered keynote or invited speeches at various seminars and conferences.

The Department of Biotechnology of the Government of India awarded him the National Bioscience Award for Career Development, one of the highest Indian science awards in 2007.

== Selected bibliography ==
- Jalali, Saakshi; Kohli, Samantha; Latka, Chitra; Bhatia, Sugandha; Vellarikal, Shamsudheen Karuthedath; Sivasubbu, Sridhar; Scaria, Vinod; Ramachandran, Srinivasan (2 June 2015). "Screening Currency Notes for Microbial Pathogens and Antibiotic Resistance Genes Using a Shotgun Metagenomic Approach". PLOS ONE. 10 (6) e0128711. Bibcode:2015PLoSO..1028711J. doi:10.1371/journal.pone.0128711. ISSN 1932-6203. PMC 4452720. PMID 26035208.
- Puniya, Bhanwar Lal; Kulshreshtha, Deepika; Mittal, Inna; Mobeen, Ahmed; Ramachandran, Srinivasan (22 March 2016). "Integration of Metabolic Modeling with Gene Co-expression Reveals Transcriptionally Programmed Reactions Explaining Robustness in Mycobacterium tuberculosis". Scientific Reports. 6 (1) 23440. Bibcode:2016NatSR...623440P. doi:10.1038/srep23440. ISSN 2045-2322. PMC 4802306. PMID 27000948.
- Chaudhuri, Rupanjali; Kulshreshtha, Deepika; Raghunandanan, Muthukurussi Varieth; Ramachandran, Srinivasan (1 March 2014). "Integrative immunoinformatics for Mycobacterial diseases in R platform". Systems and Synthetic Biology. 8 (1): 27–39. doi:10.1007/s11693-014-9135-9. ISSN 1872-5325. PMC 3933634. PMID 24592289.

== See also ==
- Shotgun metagenomics
- Metabolic network modelling
