= Konstantin Velichkov Specialised Secondary School of Mathematics =

Secondary school in Pazardzhik

- Профилирана математическа гимназия „Константин Величков“

Location
- San Stefano Street 1 Pazardzhik, Pazardzhik Province; Bulgaria
- Coordinates: 42°11′17″N 24°19′45″E

Information
- School type: Secondary school
- Established: 1971
- Principal: Radka Spasova
- Age: 11 to 18
- Classes offered: 5-12

Konstantin Velichkov Specialised Secondary School of Mathematics (Bulgarian: Профилирана математическа гимназия „Константин Величков“) is a public secondary school in Pazardzhik, Bulgaria.

== History ==
The school was formally founded on 27 May 1971, succeeding the polytechnic gymnasium. The first selection exams were held and over 200 students were accepted into the school. A brief name change was done in 1981 but was reversed a few years later, in 1987. During these years, new core subjects were added, such as physics, biology and chemistry, with each subject having its own class. In 1988-1989, admissions for advanced foreign language study began. The next years, informatics and computer graphics were added as core subjects.

In modern times, the secondary school has 64 teachers and 790 students. It is shown by the overall results from the National External Assessment as academically prepared. Since 2019, the school is affiliated with different Erasmus+ projects, like flipped classroom, gamification, critical and creative thinking and ecology, with students in the 9th–11th grades being able to participate.

The principal is Radka Spasova, while the deputy principals are Nadezhda Kordova and Velichka Mileva.

== Core subjects ==
Before the fall of communism in Bulgaria, classes focused on advanced study of mathematics and physics until the late 1990s when informatics, computer graphics and foreign languages became the focal point of teaching. Since the 2000s, there has been a total of five core subjects for admission, them being mathematics, informatics, programming, information technology, biology, chemistry and English.
