= Flipped classroom =

Instructional strategy and a type of blended learning

Flipped classroom teaching at Clintondale High School in Michigan, United States

A flipped classroom is an instructional strategy and a type of blended learning. It aims to increase student engagement and learning by having pupils complete readings at home, and work on live problem-solving during class time. This pedagogical style moves activities, including those that may have traditionally been considered homework, into the classroom. With a flipped classroom, students watch online lectures, collaborate in online discussions, or carry out research at home, while actively engaging concepts in the classroom with a mentor's guidance.

In traditional classroom instruction, the teacher is typically the leader of a lesson, the focus of attention, and the primary disseminator of information during the class period. The teacher responds to questions while students refer directly to the teacher for guidance and feedback. Many traditional instructional models rely on lecture-style presentations of individual lessons, limiting student engagement to activities in which they work independently or in small groups on application tasks, devised by the teacher. The teacher typically takes a central role in class discussions, controlling the conversation's flow. Typically, this style of teaching also involves giving students the at-home tasks of reading from textbooks or practicing concepts by working, for example, on problem sets.

The flipped classroom intentionally shifts instruction to a learner-centered model, in which students are often initially introduced to new topics outside of school, freeing up classroom time for the exploration of topics in greater depth, creating meaningful learning opportunities. With a flipped classroom, 'content delivery' may take a variety of forms, often featuring video lessons prepared by the teacher or third parties, although online collaborative discussions, digital research, and text readings may alternatively be used. The ideal length for a video lesson is widely cited as eight to twelve minutes.

Flipped classrooms also redefine in-class activities. In-class lessons accompanying flipped classroom may include activity learning or more traditional homework problems, among other practices, to engage students in the content. Class activities vary but may include: using math manipulatives and emerging mathematical technologies, in-depth laboratory experiments, original document analysis, debate or speech presentation, current event discussions, peer reviewing, project-based learning, and skill development or concept practice Because these types of active learning allow for highly differentiated instruction, more time can be spent in class on higher-order thinking skills such as problem-finding, collaboration, design and problem solving as students tackle difficult problems, work in groups, research, and construct knowledge with the help of their teacher and peers.

A teacher's interaction with students in a flipped classroom can be more personalized and less didactic and students are actively involved in knowledge acquisition and construction as they participate in and evaluate their learning.

== History ==
Militsa Nechkina, a member of the USSR Academy of Pedagogical Sciences, first proposed the flipped classroom model in 1984. In the 1980s and 1990s, teachers in Russia tried this instructional strategy. "...let pupils extract new things from autonomous reading of a textbook, which has been created accordingly. Allow them to consider it, then discuss it with their teacher at school and come to a united conclusion." Nechkina wrote of the flipped classroom.

In 1993, Alison King published "From Sage on the Stage to Guide on the Side," in which she focuses on the importance of the use of class time for the construction of meaning rather than information transmission. While not directly illustrating the concept of "flipping" a classroom, King's work is often cited as an impetus for an inversion to allow for the educational space for active learning.

Harvard professor Eric Mazur played a significant role in the development of concepts influencing flipped teaching through the development of an instructional strategy he called peer instruction. Mazur published a book in 1997 outlining the strategy, entitled Peer Instruction: A User's Manual. He found that his approach, which moved information transfer out of the classroom and information assimilation into the classroom, allowed him to coach students in their learning instead of lecturing.

Lage, Platt and Treglia published a paper entitled "Inverting the Classroom: A Gateway to Creating an Inclusive Learning Environment" (2000), which discusses their research on flipped classrooms at the college level. In their research focusing on two college economics courses, Lage, Platt, and Treglia assert that one can leverage the class time that becomes available from the inversion of the classroom (moving information presentation via lecture out of the classroom to media such as computers or VCRs) to meet the needs of students with a wide variety of learning styles. The University of Wisconsin-Madison deployed software to replace lectures in large lecture-based computer science course with streaming video of the lecturer and coordinated slides. In the late 1990s, J. Wesley Baker was experimenting with these same ideas at Cedarville University. He presented a paper discussing what he termed the "classroom flip" at an education conference in the year 2000 in what may be the first published mention of the word "flip" associated with this model of teaching and learning.

Kaw and Hess published a paper in 2007 to compare the effectiveness of four (4) instructional modalities for a single topic of a ATEM course -(i) traditional lecture, (ii) blended (what they called "Web-enhanced lecture"), (iii) Web-based self-study and (iv) flipped (what they called "Web-based self-study and classroom discussion"). Statistical analysis of the assessment data indicated that the second modality, in which Web-based modules for instruction were used during face-to-face lecture delivery mode, resulted in higher levels of student performance and satisfaction.

A recognizable contributor to the flipped classroom is Salman Khan. In 2004, Khan began recording videos at the request of a younger cousin he was tutoring because she felt that recorded lessons would let her skip segments she had mastered and replay parts that were troubling her. Based on this model, Salman Khan founded Khan Academy, which some associate with the flipped classroom; however, these videos are only one form of the flipped classroom strategy.

The Wisconsin Collaboratory for Enhanced Learning has built two centers to focus on flipped and blended learning. The classroom structure houses technology and collaboration-friendly learning spaces, and emphasis for those involved in the program is placed on individualized learning through non-traditional teaching strategies such as flipped classroom.

To decrease student resistance, Clark, Kaw and Braga Gomes have used adaptive learning in the pre-class preparation for flipped classrooms. Because adaptive learning reduces student time and ensures required mastery learning, the flipped classroom became more favorable and decreased perception of responsibility.

Educational researchers have noted that the flipped classroom model draws on earlier pedagogical approaches such as constructivism, active learning, and peer instruction. These approaches emphasize student engagement and the use of class time for collaborative problem solving. This formed a foundation for flipped learning.

=== COVID-19 Pandemic ===
Recently, a group of researchers have also stated the importance of hybrid-flipped classroom strategy during the COVID-19 pandemic in imparting online education, particularly in context of developing economies. Authors describe that the hybrid-flipped classroom strategy is expected to benefit a larger learner-instructor community during the pandemic.

A 2021 Nature Humanities & Social Sciences Communications study found that students in a flipped learning environment during the COVID‑19 pandemic reported significant increases in both intrinsic and extrinsic motivation. They also had improved perceptions of their own learning. The flipped model, which is built around pre‑class videos and small‑group activities, was valued for its practical and interactive components. Students rated this as the most effective part of the course. The study also showed that students that already had experience in flipped learning benefited more. It reported higher motivation and more positive reactions to videos, quizzes, and group work. The authors noted persistent challenges such as unequal access to technology, digital skill gaps, and anxiety to remote learning conditions. Overall, the article highlighted how flipped learning supported engagement during pandemic while also revealing the technological and psychological barriers that shaped the students' experiences.

=== In practice ===
Woodland Park High School chemistry teachers Jonathan Bergmann and Aaron Sams began practicing flipped teaching at the high school level when, in 2007, they recorded their lectures and posted them online to accommodate students who missed their classes. They note that one person cannot be credited with having invented the inverted or flipped classroom, and assert that there is no one 'right' way to flip a classroom as approaches and teaching styles are diverse, as are needs of schools. They went on to develop the "Flipped-Mastery" model and wrote extensively about it in their book Flip Your Classroom.

In 2011 educators in Michigan's Clintondale High School flipped every classroom. Principal Greg Green led an effort to help teachers develop plans for flipped classrooms, and worked with social studies teacher, Andy Scheel, to run two classes with identical material and assignments, one flipped and one conventional. The flipped class had many students who had already failed the class—some multiple times. After 20 weeks, students in the flipped classroom were outperforming students in the traditional classrooms. Further, no students in the flipped classrooms scored lower than a C+, while the previous semester 13 percent had failed. The traditional classroom showed no change. Before this, Clintondale had been designated as among the state's worst 5 percent. The next year when teachers used a flipped model in the 9th grade, the failure rates in English, math, science, and social studies dropped significantly, with the now-flipped school's failure rate dropping from 30 to 10 percent in 2011. Results on standardized tests went up in 2012, but then dropped.

MEF University, a non-profit private university located in Istanbul, Turkey, claims to be the first university in the world that has adopted the "flipped classroom" educational model university-wide.

Proponents of flipped classrooms in higher education have had an interest in seeing this put into practice in university classrooms. Professors at the University of Graz conducted a study in which lectures were video recorded in a manner in which students could have access to them throughout the semester of a lecture-based course on educational psychology. The professors surveyed how the students used their educational tools: attending lectures and watching or rewatching videos. Students subsequently rated (on a scale of 1=none to 6=nearly all) how often they used these materials. The majority of students (68.1%) relied on watching the podcasts but had low attendance rates compared to their podcast usage. The remainder of the students either rarely watched podcasts (19.6%) or somewhat used the podcasts (12.3%), but both had similar lecture attendance. Students that watched the videos more than their peers performed better than those who chose otherwise.

On June 27, 2016, Jonathan Bergmann, one of the originators of flipped learning, launched the Flipped Learning Global Initiative, led by Errol St.Clair Smith. On January 26, 2018 the Flipped Learning Global Initiative introduced its International Faculty, created to deliver a consistent standard of training and ongoing support to schools and school systems around the world.

== Student perceptions ==
Students may be more likely to favor the flipped classroom approach once they have taken the time to personally participate in this specific type of learning course. In a prior pharmaceutics course, for instance, a mere 34.6% of the 19 students initially preferred the flipped classroom setting. After all of the students had participated in the Pharmaceutical Flipped Classroom course, the number of those favoring this method of learning increased significantly, reaching a total of 89.5%. Individuals interested in a more problem-solving, hands-on form of learning are more likely to benefit from the flipped classroom, as it strays from a traditional lecture learning style. Students may initially have certain doubts or fears regarding the use of flipped classroom, including:

- The fear of having to "teach oneself", as in, having a lack of proper guidance from a designated instructor, leading to greater pressure on the student to study the content rigorously in order to perform well in the course
- Obtaining a greater amount of academic work to achieve success within the course, as a result of minimal guidance from an instructor
- The fear of obtaining a greater sense of confusion on topics discussed, which may correlate to the heavy focus on group discussion and problem-solving activities that a flipped classroom encourages

A flipped classroom is composed of various components, such as (this only represents a few examples):

1. video collections
2. digital slideshows (e.g. PowerPoint)
3. student discussion
4. teacher/student online communication

It has been determined, through several conducted experiments, that certain aspects of the flipped classroom approach are more beneficial to students than others. For instance, in a study conducted on the feedback received from students who had participated in a flipped classroom teaching module for college English reading, the following results were derived:

- 92.59% of the students ultimately accepted the flipped classroom teaching module in general
- 59.26% of the students accepted the "video form" of the teaching module, essentially provided as a resource for the course
- 100.00% of the students believed that the "learning guide" link provided in the teaching module was necessary for performing well in the course

From these specific statistics, it can be determined that students felt that their experience within the flipped classroom was greatly benefited by certain aspects of the course (such as the learning guide provided), while other portions of the module may have been unnecessary or insignificant to their learning (such as the video form of the module).

== Benefits ==
There are various benefits attributed to the flipped classroom approach, including:

1. A college reading empirical study identified the flipped classroom's approach as including all forms of learning (i.e. oral, visual, listening, hands on, problem solving, etc.).
2. Rather than learning in a traditional classroom setting, the flipped classroom uses a more application-based approach for students (i.e. hands on and problem solving activities).
3. The flipped classroom may offer greater accessibility, especially for students that face difficulties in traveling to the physical classroom. Such students still have the foundational information of the course at hand online.
4. Communication is greatly emphasized in a flipped classroom setting, essentially referring to: student-student and student-teacher interactions.
5. The flipped classroom uses a student-centered teaching model to ensure that the course is primarily aimed at contributing to the student's overall success in obtaining a proper, effective education.
6. It avoids the overarching idea of "cramming" for exams and forgetting the information post-examination, as it encourages students to understand the underlying rationale behind the information provided being provided to them.
7. Students must account for their responsibility to learn the foundational information provided, as their personal work and contribution will be reflected in the grade that they receive at the end of the course. This will, in turn, make them better prepared for future, more difficult courses.
8. Although there is a lack of support in the pre-class section, the questions aroused during watching the video could serve as the raw materials for subsequent class activities, such as discussion. As a result, students are more focused in the in-class session and thus the use of video could potentially boost the effect of the in-class activities.
9. Recent applications have demonstrated that students are more determined about accomplishing an exercise. They are also more engaged about their progression and output.
10. A systematic review shows that flipped learning increases students confidence, improves belief in their ability to learn, and reduces anxiety in difficult subjects.
11. A 2024 systematic review reported that flipped learning in higher education is associated with improved academic performance, increased student engagement, and enhanced self regulated learning behaviors.
12. Flipped learning improves conceptual understanding, supports active learning gains, increases student autonomy and may improve performance in STEM courses.
13. A meta-analysis has shown that flipped learning is most effective when pre-class materials are short, structured and clear and students are held accountable for preparation.

== Limitations and criticisms ==
Critics argue the flipped classroom model has some consequences for both students and teachers.

=== Student ability ===
For students, there exists a 'digital divide'. Not all families are from the same socio-economic background, and thus access to computers or video-viewing technology outside of the school environment is not possible for all students. This model of instruction may put undue pressure on some families as they attempt to gain access to videos outside of school hours. To help students who don't have access to technology, Clintondale high school opens its computer labs at 7 am and keeps them available during lunch time as well as after the school day ends. Staff members are also present during these hours for students who need support to make the Flipped Classroom Model more accessible.

Additionally, some students may struggle due to their developing personal responsibility. In a self-directed, home learning environment students who are not at the developmental stage required to keep on-task with independent learning may fall rapidly behind their peers.

=== Screen time ===
Other educators, such as Lisa Nielsen, argue that the flipped classroom leads to increased screen time in an era where adolescents already spend too much time in front of computer screens. Inverted models that rely on computerized videos do contribute to this challenge, particularly if videos are long.

=== Passive learning ===
Flipped classrooms that rely on videos to deliver instruction suffer some of the same challenges as direct instruction. Students may not learn best by listening to a lecture, and watching instructional videos at home is still representative of passive learning.

=== Homework compliance ===
Flipped learning requires students to watch videos or explore other course content before class. It can be a challenge to ensure that students are actually watching the pre-class videos. Students skipping the pre-class videos and coming unprepared to class have a negative effect on in-classroom activities. Strategies such limiting videos to 6 minutes and pre-class activities to 20 minutes help students stay engaged and feel less overwhelmed. Teachers have also used strategies of including a learning management system or designing follow up quizzes to video content to encourage student engagement.

=== Increased preparation ===
Teachers may find challenges with this model as well. Increased preparation time is initially likely- needed, as creating high quality videos requires teachers to contribute significant time and effort outside of regular teaching responsibilities. Additional funding may also be required to procure training for teachers to navigate computer technologies involved in the successful implementation of the inverted model. An IRRODL review identifies the challenges of Flipped learning requiring an increased workload for instructors. This means more preparation time, more planning, and more technological setup. Students also show resistance and adaptation difficulties. Students often struggle with adjusting to pre‑class preparation such as managing time with the shift from passive to active learning.

=== Variability ===
The potential performance increase from flipped classrooms varies greatly on classroom by classroom basis. The potential benefits may be affected by the method of conducting the classroom and the level of intensity of the course. Currently, the amount of research available is not enough to create rigorous practical guidelines for all teachers to use. Therefore, some teachers may conduct the flipped classroom more effectively than others. In addition, the level of intensity of the course may also play a crucial role in the efficacy of the flipped model. Researchers often witness a more defined performance increase in K-12 education as opposed to college or graduate education. In foreign language education, flipped classrooms seem less effective for students with lower proficiency in the target language.

=== Active learning ===
In 2022, a review of meta-analyses and a follow-up meta-analysis was done on flipped classrooms. They claim that they found that most were simply flipping and adding more traditional class work as opposed to using active learning. They propose a more specific model for flipping, "Fail, Flip, Fix, and Feed" model which is intended to address some criticisms of flipped learning they identified, such as the lack of active learning. Resistance from students to active learning still exists.

== Effectiveness ==
A randomized controlled trial found no difference in exam scores between flipped classroom and direct instruction.

A 2019 meta‑analysis of 55 studies (115 effect sizes) found that flipped classrooms produced a small but statistically significant improvement in cognitive learning outcomes. The authors reported diverse content across studies and no evidence of publication bias.

Flipped learning improves student performance. A review found that most studies reported higher academic achievement, improved conceptual understanding and better performance on assessments. Flipped learning also improves student engagement. Reports from the IRRODL review show improvement in motivation and participation. Shown in the review, this method also increases student-teacher interactions with more time for feedback and collaborative learning.

A meta-analysis of the effectiveness of flipped learning in Elementary School has shown that flipped learning has a significant effect on academic achievement. It has shown a moderate positive effect size and is consistent throughout grades.

== Examples ==
- Medical classroom: In multiple classrooms, short videos about the current medical topic, rheumatology, that was being taught in the class were created and uploaded to YouTube or emailed to students for a medical class. The students were to watch the videos before attending lecture. The lecture class was then used to focus on application of the material learned in the videos through case studies and activities to give students a more interactive type of learning in the classroom. To enforce the use of videos for pre-lecture, students were asked to take a quiz or complete a homework assignment and turn it in before class.
- College English reading: The flipped classroom method of teaching was implemented in an English reading course for 16 weeks per semester. Teaching through audio outside of the classroom was used through videos paired with information slides. Online resources were also supplied. The videos supplemented the readings and allowed for more analysis and participation in class, and they included background knowledge of the subject and analytical questions to be discussed in class. A study-guide was provided for each video so that students could come prepared to class. Some classes included software that combined all of the resources accessible by students for the material that was assigned outside of the class period. The software also included small tests to assess a student's understanding of video material.
- Physics: In one instance, the flipped classroom technique was implemented in a physics classroom at Tufts University by a professor (Vesal Dini) who studied the method. The pre-lecture videos were not made specifically by the teacher, but instead they were watched on an online learning platform (in this case, Sapling Learning). Before class, students were supposed to watch the pre-lecture videos, take a quiz, and write down any questions they had. During class, the information in the videos was applied to questions through group discussion activities and hands-on simulations. In other classrooms, students have also been encouraged by their professors to attend other public lectures to gain more information.
- Chemistry: In a chemistry class in Glenview, IL, pre-lecture materials were distributed through Moodle and YouTube. In class, students independently completed problems while the professor acted as a guide in case anyone needed assistance. Along with practice problems, labs were also completed during regular class time, and workshops about choosing the appropriate approach, order and technique were implemented. Study materials for tests were administered through the videos to prepare students for assessments. In the chemistry setting, only certain topics were flipped. For example, the flipped classroom technique was implemented for chromatography and electrophoresis, but the traditional classroom teaching method was used for the topics of absorbance and emission and spectroscopy. The lecture videos went over the theory, instrumentation and explanation of the flipped topics. Administered exams for the flipped topics were then based more on what was done in class than the lecture videos.
- Numerical methods: The flipped classroom is used for a numerical methods course in University of South Florida. The class of 100 is broken into two sections that meet separately twice a week for 75 minutes each for recitation sessions and once a week for 50 minutes together for a lecture session. Pre-lecture materials include YouTube videos and textbook materials. The materials for the week are laid out categorically for the student and suggested blogs and extra homework are also mentioned. The students complete an online quiz via the CANVAS LMS at home before coming to class. During the recitation session, concept questions and in-class exercises are distributed. These questions are solved by students individually and then answers are shared in a group of four. During this time, the instructor and two teaching assistants help students with any difficulties they may come across. Based on how students are responding, the instructor discusses some of the problems. The instructor also gives mini-lectures on some topics that may be difficult to process by students on their own. During the lecture session, the instructor wraps up the topic of the week and introduces students to the topic of the upcoming week. To enhance the benefits and reduce the workload associated with a flipped classroom, the pre-class preparation is now done through adaptive lessons for half of the course (limited funding). A commercial adaptive platform, Smart Sparrow, that combines video lectures, text and assessment via multiple-choice and algorithmic questions is being used. The results show a Cohen's d approximately equal to 0.40 for the free-response questions of the course final examination and 0.6 standard deviations improvement in personalization.
- Programming: The flipped classroom was successfully used in 2013 to teach a programming class at a university. Students watched video lectures and attempted self-check quizzes before classroom contact time. During class time, students worked on programming problems and other active learning activities instead of traditional lectures. Student feedback on this pedagogy was generally very positive with many respondents considering it effective and helpful for learning.

== Combination with other educational approaches ==
Flipped classroom can be combined with peer instruction (Dumont, 2014), mastery learning (Bergmann and Sams, 2013), adaptive learning, gamification (Volkswagen, 2009), cooperative learning (Fortanet, González, Mira Pastor and López Ramón, 2013), inclusive education, micro feedback loops, and repeated review.

=== Flipped mastery ===
In traditional schools, each topic in class receives a fixed amount of time for all students. Flipped mastery classrooms apply a mastery learning model that requires each student to master a topic before moving to the next one.

Mastery learning was briefly popular in the 1920s, and was revived by Benjamin Bloom in 1968. While it is difficult to implement in large, traditional classrooms, it has shown dramatic success in improving student learning. The mastery model allows teachers to provide the materials, tools and support for learning while students set goals and manage their time.

Mastery rewards students for displaying competence. Students who initially turn in shoddy work must correct it before moving on. Before flipping, mastery learning was impractical in most schools. It was not possible to give different lectures for different groups of students. Testing was also impractical, because fast-learning students could reveal the test to those who followed.

In a flipped mastery classroom, students view each lecture and work on each exercise or project when they have mastered the precursors.

Flipped mastery eliminates two other out-of-class routines: daily lesson planning and grading papers. The latter happens in class and in person. Replacing lectures with group and individual activities increases in-class activity. Every student has something to do throughout the class. In some classes, students choose how to demonstrate mastery—testing, writing, speaking, debating and even designing a related game. Learning Management Systems such as Moodle or ILIAS provide ways to manage the testing process. They create a different test for each student from a pool of questions. Advocates claim that its efficiency allows most students to do a year's work in much less time. Advanced students work on independent projects while slower learners get more personalized instruction. Some students might not get through the year's material, but demonstrated competence on the parts they did complete.

== See also ==
- Education 3.0
- Jigsaw (teaching technique)
- Evidence-based education
- Autodidactism
- Learning by teaching
- Massive open online course
- Rotation model of learning
- Education software
