= Education 3.0 =

Technology-driven learning model beyond traditional education

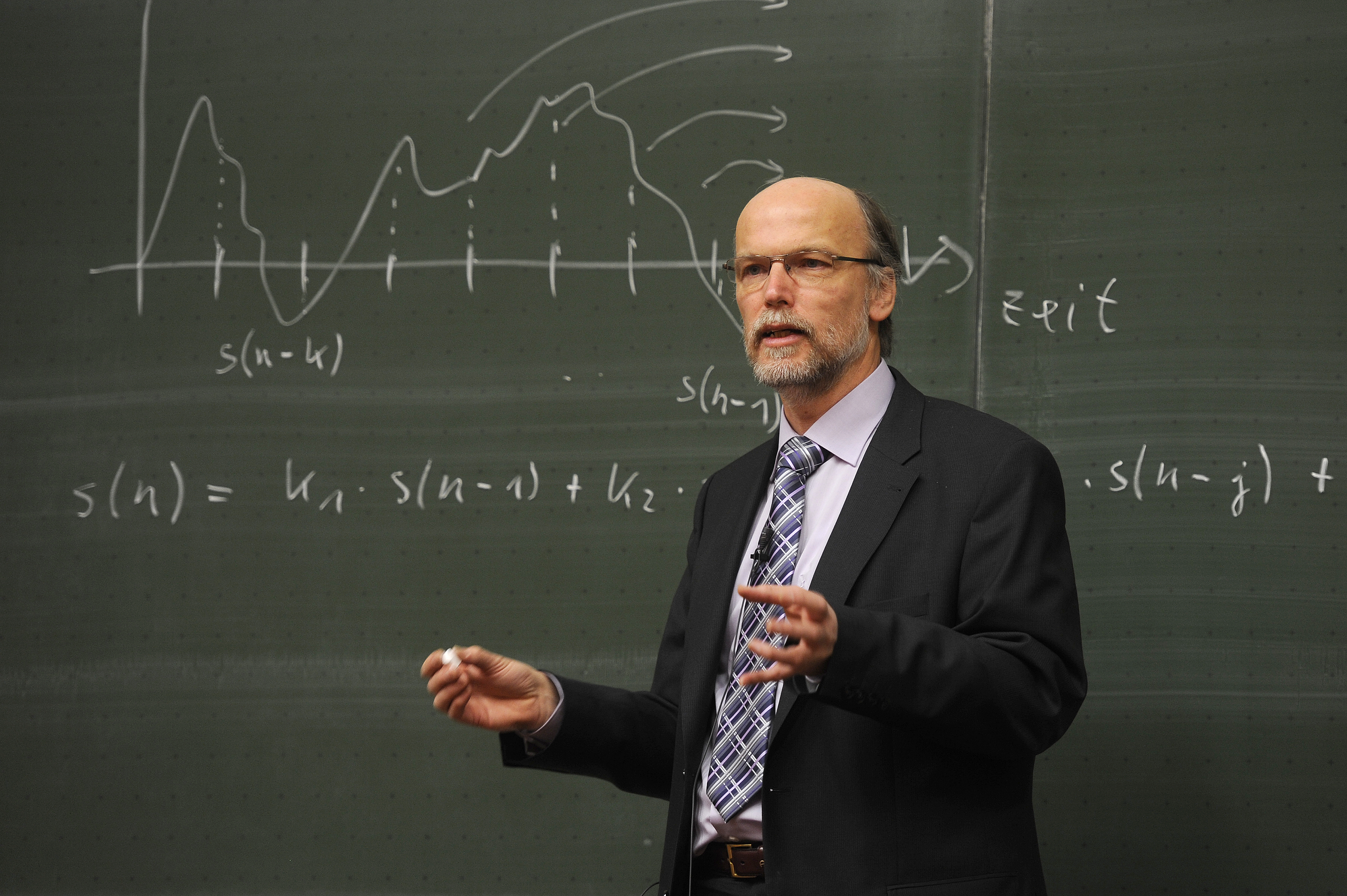
In Education 3.0, classrooms would move away from lectures, such as this one, to having class time be spent on discussions and projects, using digital technology.

Education 3.0 is an umbrella term used by educational theorists to describe a variety of ways to integrate technology into learning. According to Jeff Borden, Education 3.0 entails a confluence of neuroscience, cognitive psychology, and education technology, using web-based digital and mobile technology, including apps, hardware and software, and "anything else with an e in front of it." Instead of viewing digital technology as a competitor to current teaching models, Education 3.0 means actively embracing new technologies to see how they can help students learn efficiently. Writer Michael Horn describes it as moving "beyond mass education to mass-customized education through blended learning," using the flexibility of technology to help students of varying backgrounds and skills. The term has been included in the term Entrepreneurship Education 3.0 which denotes a broadening of entrepreneurship education with interdisciplinary appeal for non-business majors, according to a report in Technically Philly magazine.

With Education 3.0, classes move away from traditional lectures and instead focus on interactive learning, with question and answer sessions, reviews and quizzes, discussions, labs, and other project-based learning. It usually involves customization and personalization, such that educational content is tailored to meet the needs of specific students. It can mean reversing the traditional classroom learning, in which lectures happen in class and homework is done out of class, into flipped classrooms, such that new content is delivered online while students work on assignments together in class.

Lectures move online—which handles students' need for personalization—and, as one of Lee's presentations states, "What in a class? Anything but lecturing!" Class time moves away from PowerPoint, blackboards, and whiteboards and is instead devoted to interactive and applied learning—questions and answers, review and summary, quizzes, interactive problem solving, discussion, project-based learning, and labs.

— Michael Horn, 2014, in Forbes magazine

The term has been used by educational theorists in South Korea and in Latin America. According to a report in Forbes magazine, schools such as the Korea Advanced Institute of Science and Technology or KAIST are actively exploring Education 3.0. In Latin America, Educación 3.0 is being explored as a way to make education affordable to impoverished people throughout the region, and to help ameliorate poverty.
