= Wolfgang Leidhold =

German political scientist, philosopher and painter

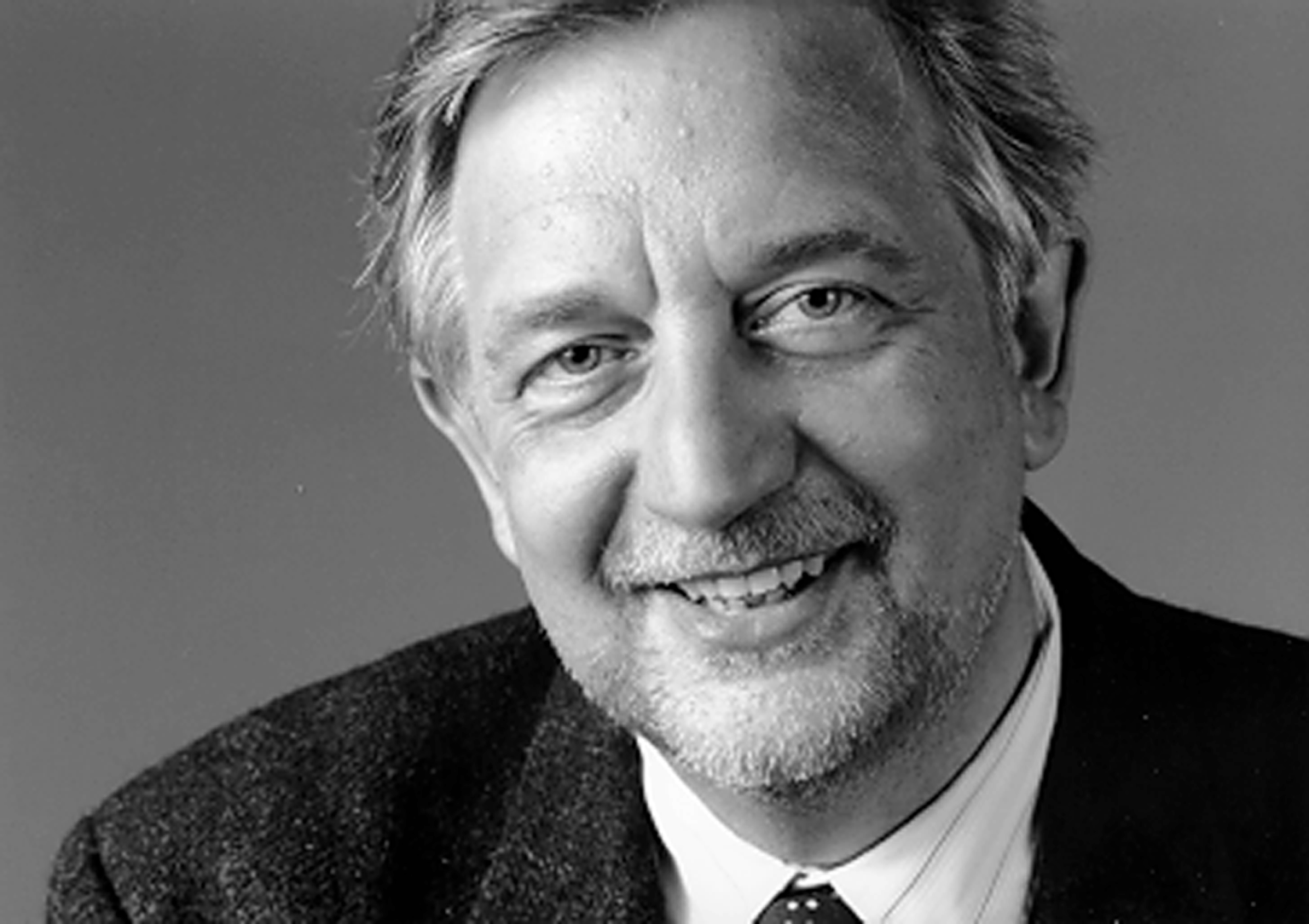
Wolfgang Leidhold

Wolfgang Leidhold (born 12 December 1950 in Dortmund) is a German political scientist, philosopher and artist. He works as a full professor at the Faculty of Management, Economics and Social Sciences of the University of Cologne, with a focus on political theory and the history of ideas. The scope of his work ranges from the Paleolithic to the present day. Since the 1980s he has been exploring the history of experience and its transformations. He recently published the results of his research in The History of Experience: A Study in Experiential Turns and Cultural Dynamics from the Paleolithic to the Present Day (New York, NY, 2023). The main focus of his artistic work is painting and drawing. His works have been exhibited in the US and Germany.

== Academic career ==
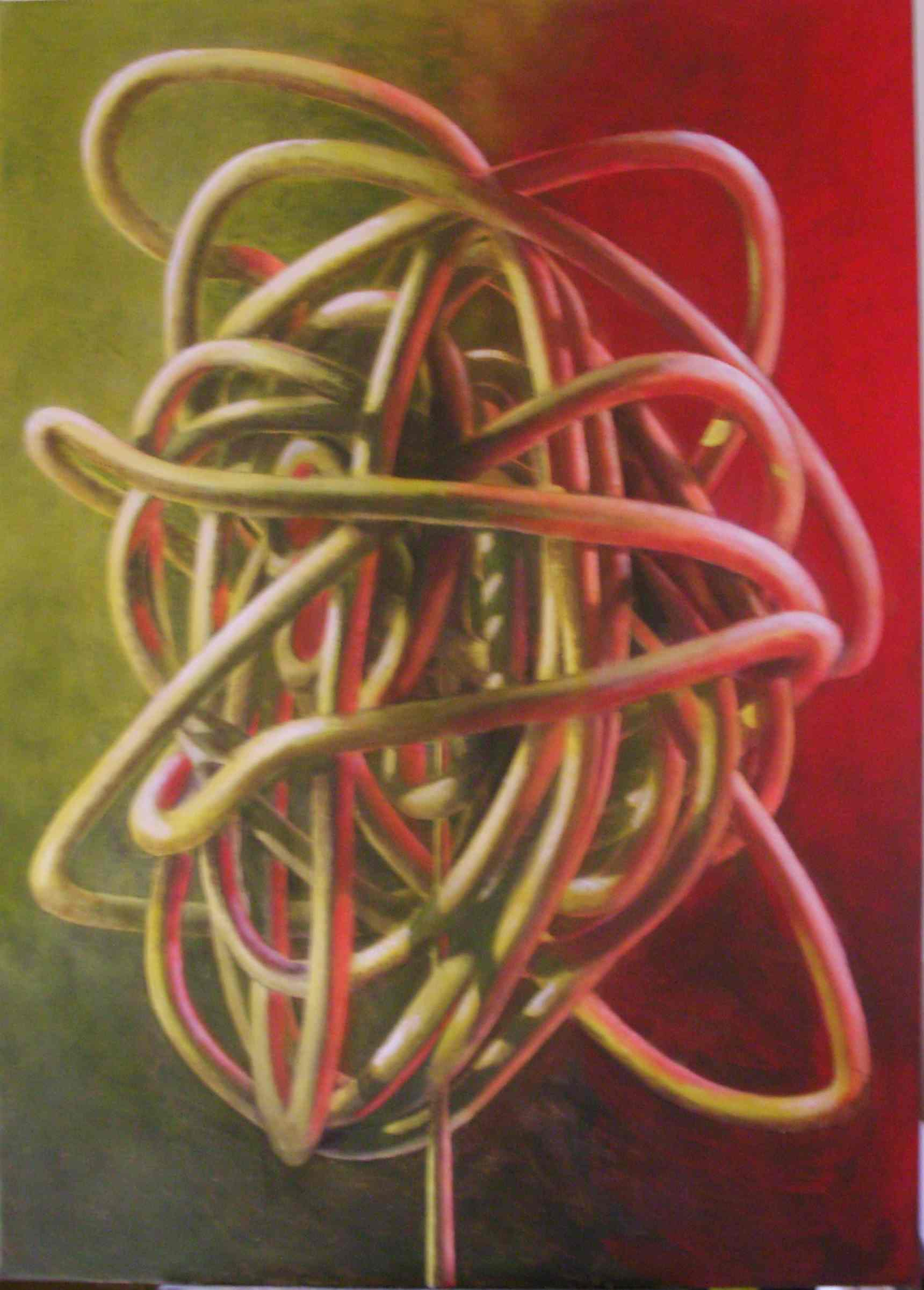
Knoten IV

Leidhold studied social sciences, philosophy and East Asian studies at the Ruhr University Bochum. His teachers included Norbert Elias, Günter Gawlick, Jürgen Gebhardt, Leo Kofler, Eric Voegelin and Peter Weber-Schäfer. After completing his master's degree with a thesis on René Descartes (unpublished) and studying at Stanford University, CA, he received his PhD in 1982 with a thesis on "Ethics and Politics in Francis Hutcheson."

From 1978 to 1989 he was an assistant professor at the University of Erlangen, teaching political philosophy, history of ideas and international relations. During the 80s, Leidhold focused on international relations, on security issues in particular, especially in cooperation with the German Institute for International and Security Affairs (SWP). Funded by the Thyssen Foundation (Cologne) he initiated a project on the Pacific Island Region and international security (1986–1988). During this time, he worked as a research fellow at the Center for Strategic and International Studies (CSIS) of Georgetown University in Washington, D.C., than directed by Ray Cline. Later on he was associated with the East-West-Center and the University of Hawaiʻi at Mānoa.

Extensive research trips took him to the Pacific Island states, Australia, and New Zealand. This provided the empirical basis for his monograph "Crisis Under the Southern Cross. The Pacific Island Region and International Security". With this thesis, Leidhold received his post-doctoral lecturing qualification in political science.

From 1991 to 1992, Leidhold served as Interim Professor the Eric Voegelin Chair at the Geschwister-Scholl-Institute of LMU Munich and the Chair of International Relations at the Catholic University of Eichstätt-Ingolstadt. In 1992, he became a full professor of political science at the University of Cologne, focusing on political theory and the history of ideas. The study of the structure of experience and its historical development from the Paleolithic to the present has been his priority since then. Aside from numerous other research projects, he initiated and designed ILIAS in 1997, an open-source online learning platform that enjoys worldwide distribution. His dedication to the project was honored with the ILIAS honorary award in 2015.

Currently, he is exploring the relationship between experience and ecology, as well as the development of a trans-human ecological ethos.

The Festschrift "Experience" (2021) illustrates the international impact of Leidhold's ideas.

== Artistic career ==
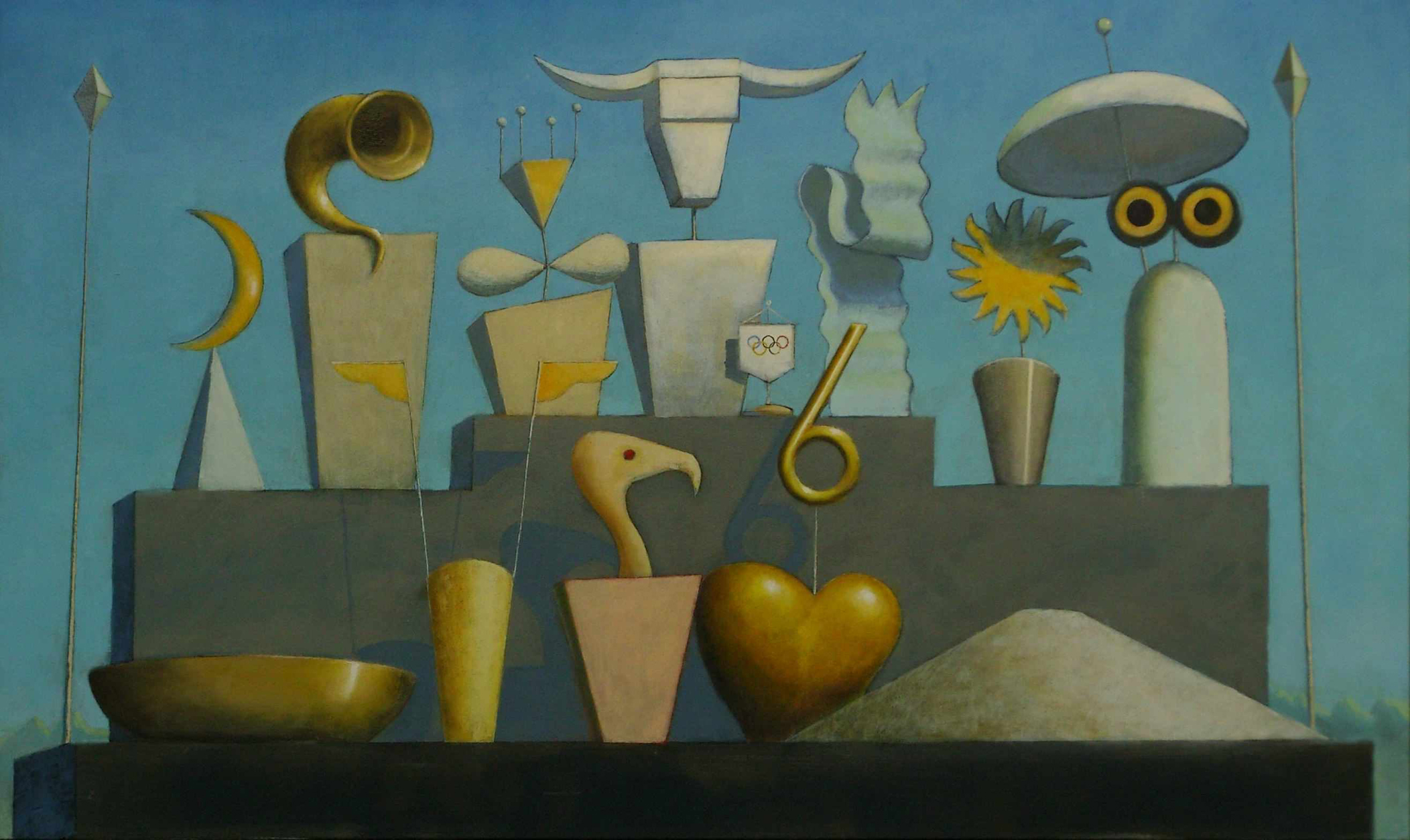
Zeus Olympisches Komitee

Parallel to his academic education, he studied painting and drawing in the class of Hans-Jürgen "Hänner" Schlieker (1924–2004) at the fine arts department of the Ruhr University Bochum (Musisches Zentrum, MZ) from 1972 to 1975.

In 2010, the Chelsea Art Museum in New York City invited Leidhold to present a solo exhibition the following year entitled "Knots and Other Stories" (Mar. 04, 2011 – Apr. 02, 2011). Major galleries in the U.S. and Germany feature his work.

In addition, he assists the New York-based Boris Lurie Art Foundation as a consultant in promoting the Jewish artist Boris Lurie (1924–2008). He initiated and coordinated two solo exhibitions of Boris Lurie's artwork at the NS-Documentation Center in Cologne (2014) and the Jewish Museum in Berlin (2016).

== Work ==
=== International security ===
In the field of international relations, Leidhold focused on military aspects of security policy, particularly in Europe and the Asia-Pacific region. In addition, he developed the simulation game "Politics and International Security" (POLIS) as a teaching tool, which took into account the interdependence of political, economic and military aspects on a global level. The simulation was intended to complement theoretical knowledge with the experience of acting in complex and dynamic situations. For this he was awarded the Karl Carstens Prize by the Federal Academy for Security Policy (Bonn, Germany) in 2001.

In his study "Crisis Under the Southern Cross, The Pacific Island Region and International Security" (1991), Leidhold explored the question of how security relations develop between the small Pacific island states and their larger neighbors on their periphery, such as Australia, New Zealand, but also the United States, China, Japan and the former Soviet Union. In addition to structural factors such as political systems, geography, economics, and political alliances, he also made experience a central theme, as small island states view their security situation quite differently than major powers and large territorial states.

=== Concept of experience ===
==== Dimensions of experience ====
The study of experience became the major focus in Leidhold's research and publications. The point of departure for his interest in this was his study of the Scottish philosopher Francis Hutcheson (1694–1746). Hutcheson, like John Locke, wanted to base ethics on experience, but considered the empiricist formula, classical since Aristotle, to be unsuitable. This formula stated: from the senses comes memory, and from many memories comes experience. Locke considered the sensory experience of pleasure and pain to be crucial. Hutcheson noted that many morally good actions are painful, such as risking one's lives to save someone from drowning in icy water. Therefore, he claimed that moral ideas emerge from their own dimension of experience, which he believed was based on a particular sense, which he called moral sense. In his last book, System of Moral Philosophy, he enumerated more than a dozen senses (Book I, Ch. II), including a sense of beauty, and an inner sense of self-awareness and reflection. Thus, Hutcheson proposed a multi-dimensional structure of experience. In addition to his dissertation on "Ethics and Politics in Francis Hutcheson" (1982), Leidhold published a critical edition (including an introduction) of Hutcheson's "Inquriy".

==== The structure of experience ====
While Hutcheson emphasized that a monistic conception of experience could not adequately explain the development of our ideas and concepts, the concept of experience itself remained outside his critical investigations – a deficit, moreover, that seemed to pervade the entire history of ideas. A fact confirmed by the German philosopher Hans-Georg Gadamer who noted: "Paradoxical as it may seem, the concept of experience seems to me to be one of the most obscure we have". Therefore, exploring the nature of experience became Leidhold's next project. He published the results first in a series of essays and then in a book on "Political Philosophy."

There he proposes to define experience as "conscious participation" in reality. Since there are various kinds of participation, there are also various dimensions of experience. All dimensions have one feature in common: participation turns into experience when we become aware of it. The result of this analysis was a typology of experience that includes: sensory perception, imagination and creativity, spirituality and contemplation, self-reflection and consciousness. In the remainder of the book, Leidhold shows how this theory of experience affects our understanding of consciousness and religion, of metaphysics (especially of time), of anthropology, and of political reality as well.

In his next book, The Logic of Religious Experience, Leidhold focuses on the religious dimension, first systematically analyzing spiritual experience and then looking at it from an intercultural and historical perspective.

By applying his theory of experience to religion and its spiritual foundations, he shows how spiritual experience has evolved in the course of human history and throughout an array of Eastern and Western cultures. This examination reveals that the way people get in touch with the religious dimension of reality, i.e. the structure of spiritual experience, has changed several times, and that the elements of its structure were only gradually brought to light. Finally, the fully differentiated conception of religious experience is to be located in the period between 800 and 200 BC, that is, in an epoch that Karl Jaspers (1883–1969) called the "Axis Age." However, Jaspers gave no reasons as to what triggered these achievements of the Axis Age, and even his successors such as Shmuel N. Eisenstadt (1923–2010) and Robert Bellah (1927–2013) spoke of a "conundrum".

==== The dynamics of experience ====
Leidhold's examination of the history of spiritual experience shows that the innovations of the Axis Age ideas result from changes in the experiential structure. Based on the discovery of historical change in the structure of spiritual experience he suggests that all dimensions of experience each have their own history of evolution. As the review of the historical material proved, the evolution of experience begins in the Paleolithic and extends to our present.

The result is a paradigm shift: the structure of human experience is not a universal constant, but changes over time. As Leidhold demonstrates in his book The History of Experience, A Study in Experiential Turns and Cultural Dynamics from the Paleolithic to the Present Day, there is a total of nine experiential turns. The first three turns took place in Deep history: the transition from unconscious information processing to conscious perception, the unfolding of conscious imagination, and the discovery of a sense of order. Three more dimensions emerged during the Bronze Age and Antiquity: self-reflection, the Inner Eye of Reason, and a distinct approach to spiritual experience. Three more turns came about at the time of the Renaissance and modernity, adding creative imagination, consciousness, and the unconscious to the list of experiential dimensions.

All nine turns develop gradually, always going through the same sequence, composed of four phases. These four phases are:

- The incubator phase, in which individual pioneers become aware of a new dimension of experience
- The phase of articulation, when the new dimension is explicitly identified
- The phase of methodical practice, when methods evolve to make the new dimension accessible to other people
- The phase of institutionalization, when the new dimension becomes a permanent cultural feature.

Accordingly, there is not one single axis, but nine axial turns in the course of human history. The basic pattern of cultural evolution and the order of history both result from these nine experiential transformations. Cross-cultural and historical analysis reveals how the variable mix of experiential dimensions defines the specific character of each culture.

The nine experiential turns affect all areas of human existence: the course of individual lives and of human history in general, the dynamics of culture as well as the evolution of political order. For example, it was only the conscious use of a vivid imagination that allowed humans to create art since the Upper Paleolithic.

==== Nine experiential turns ====
===== From information processing to conscious perception (1) =====
The first turn in experience was the turn to explicit or conscious perception. It emerged during deep history, in the Old Stone-Age or Paleolithic. This was the epoch of stone-tool-making cultures before the advent of Neanderthals and Homo sapiens. For the survival of living beings, information processing is vital: they react to sensory input according to a stimulus-response scheme. The schema operates as implicit information processing, a process that operates without explicit, conscious awareness. The process is biologically inherited and sometimes further improved by learning.

When consciousness intervenes, this sequence is interrupted, i.e. decoupled. Decoupling creates a pause that suspends the sequence of stimulus and response. With this new sequence, humans go from perception via conscious awareness to a subsequent response. However, consciousness is also a kind of searchlight that enables subjects to direct their focus also to things outside the immediate stimulus situation. This marks the transition from biological to cultural evolution. This transition becomes evident when the deliberate practice of tool production precedes the use of tools.

===== Imagination: from implicit memory to explicit remembrance and symbolic practice (2) =====
While implicit memory is a natural ability common to many party of the biosphere, explicit memory, or imagination, is a cultural achievement and a new experience. Implicit memory enables an animal, for example, to instinctively find its way to the watering hole. Explicit remembrance enables human beings to imagine the way to the water before going there. In this turn, too, the intervention of consciousness is crucial. Here, again, a decoupling occurs: the memory of a route appears in the light of consciousness, so that we decide whether we want to follow this route or rather take another one.

By transforming implicit memory into explicit remembrance, humans gradually acquired a new ability. We can detect the first traces of an effective use of the imagination during the Upper Paleolithic. At that time, complex tools started to require foresighted planning. This imaginative ability developed latest with the advent of flint technology.

Before you can make flint tools, you must first find flint, dig it up and prepare it for processing. You have to imagine from which blanks you can make what kind of tools. Between the desire to use tools, for example in hunting, and the execution of this impulse, there is an intermediate step: the deliberate production of tools.

At some point, this new, imaginative talent ceased to be used for tool making only. Now, humans began to produce symbolic artifacts and works of art. While tools impact on things, symbols impact on the imagination. This new symbolic practice began with Homo erectus and Homo heidelbergensis. It reached its peak with the art of Homo sapiens.

Leidhold traces its development by means of symbolic artifacts and works of art. Similar to the production of tools, special method and institutions emerged to organize this process. Paleolithic cave paintings are a prominent example of this process.

===== A sense of order: the experience of participation and cosmological myth (3) =====
The first symbolic culture limited itself to episodic representation. The third transformation added the new experience of participation among the elements of the cosmos. In this turn, the sense of order emerged. The Paleolithic experience of the environment and its artistic expression is essentially episodic. Cave paintings depict individual situations, but they do not form a narrative sequence, and they do not follow a common pattern.

In the third turn of experience, the sense of order adds a cosmological syntax, connecting the hitherto isolated episodes into a coherent narrative, later known as myth. This transformation took place at about the beginning of the Mesolithic (ca. 10.000 BC). Since then, humans began to see themselves as part of a comprehensive whole, the cosmos. Accordingly, methodically constructed settlements, symbolically designed architecture, and situationally composed artworks were the first evidence of this new experience. Through the sense of order, the regular relationship of parts became the dominant principle: the cosmological system of existence.

Periphery and center, the circle and the cardinal points, the calendar and cosmological myth became the dominant symbolic forms of the cosmological system. Since the advent of writing in the Bronze Age, texts have supplemented the archive of symbolic artifacts. From now on, the experiences and ideas of these times can be understood through contemporary texts.

The nature-based rhythm of time is transformed into history, usually ordered by the principle of genealogy. Cities become the center of life. Finally, the order of common life is reorganized, for example, through fixed hierarchies, hereditary positions, and institutionalized property relations.

===== The turn to self-reflection (4) =====
The fourth experiential turn was the discovery of self-reflection. While myth spoke anonymously, the reflective turn presents the new experience of the individual self.

The prophet Zarathustra was the first to explicitly express the new experience. With self-reflection, the focus of consciousness explicitly turns from the outside to the inside, to the self. At the core of the new paradigm stood the method of introspection and responsible action, the concepts of truth, veracity, and free will. In his writings, the Gathas, Zarathustra not only described methods to follow his paradigm. He also managed to institutionalize his teachings and his methods. The prophets of Israel followed his example.

With the reflective turn, humanity's self-image changed, too: the type of the authoritative personality emerges. For the first time, humans thus became active partners in the process of history. Aside from the prophets, the Egyptian pharaoh Akhenaten, Buddha and the teachers of the Upanishads, the philosophers of Greece and China also represent the new personality type.

Simultaneously, the conception of existence in society and history changed, as did the rationale of political order. While in cosmological mythology the climax of time was at the moment of creation, now the advent of the prophet became the pivot of history.

The propagation of truth turned into a main motive of religious action, and the expansion of power emerged as the main task of political practice. The expansionist empire, like Persia in the age of Darius the Great, and its imperial ideology were the political equivalent of the prophetic message.

===== The noëtic turn or the discovery of reason (5) =====
The fifth dimension of experience evolved in Greek antiquity, as well as in India and China, when reason was discovered as a mental faculty supervising all other modes of experience. Since the Greek term for reason is ‘nous’, Leidhold calls this transformation the noëtic turn. With this turn, the origin of knowledge shifted divine sources of myth to the human side. This shift is usually called the "transition from myth to logos". The transition took place gradually, beginning with Solon, continued by the Pre-Socratics, and completed by the Sophists.

The sophists were the real founders of rational thought, since they developed its characteristic methods – such as grammar, logic, rhetoric and Public Education – and spread them throughout Greece. The movement climaxed with Plato’s synthesis. In his Politeia, the book on the city-state and the concept of justice, Plato analyzed the noëtic turn in his analogy of the cave, calling the shift a "periagogé", a "turn-around".

The Noëtic turn also created a unique model of public life. This model is closely related to the city-state, the Greek polis. In essence, the political way of life means: Replacing the eternal truths of sacred myths with fallible opinions based on common methodological practices. Thus, political culture has replaced the primary consensus based on belief in divinely endowed knowledge with a secondary consensus based on assent to the methods of rational discourse. Similar contemporaneous developments occur in China and India.

===== Spiritual experience (6) =====
Exploring the particular nature of experience that underlay religions led to the sixth turn, the turn to spiritual experience. While religious symbols date back to the Paleolithic, the experience they represent only came into explicit focus during antiquity. The new focus resulted from the discovery of the spirit, which became the key medium of religious or spiritual experience in its true sense.

In the Paleolithic the transcendent appears, e.g. in burials or in theriomorphic figures, as the Other Side in immediate vicinity to the world of the living. In cosmological cultures, the gods and demons reside in extreme distance. With prophetic experience, this "deus distans", the distant god, turned into a "deus absconditus", a hidden God. With the noëtic turn, it became clear that transcendence is a specific form of reality, called spirit.

Older attempts to communicate with transcendence ranged from ecstasy to prophetic revelation. For the preservation of spiritual achievements, special institutions were formed. At first, shamans figured as religious specialists, then whole classes like priests and religious orders took over. Finally, the spiritual turn established meditation as the key method in both East and West. Since anyone could learn meditation, this method was available to all people.

Thus, the population as a whole became part of universal denominations, such as in a church. In parallel, spiritual experience was transformed into doctrine. This gave rise to a secondary form: the religion of institutions and dogmas. However, this development is ambivalent, as the focus shifts from spiritual experience to conflicts over orthodoxy and power.

===== Creativity and the signature of modernity (7) =====
The seventh turn is about the human ability to create innovations. Humans have been innovating since the Paleolithic. Yet, until the High Middle Ages, creativity was considered the exclusive privilege of the deity. That changed with the seventh transformation.

Isolated precursors, such as the Akkadian priestess Enheduanna or the Greek poet Pindar, have long suspected that humans are also endowed with creativity. However, the vast majority believed that not only the real elements of the cosmos but also all ideas, technologies and institutions existed as eternal creations since the beginning of time. The gods then donated the "new" ideas, technologies and institutions to humans one by one in the course of history.

Eventually, however, general ideas ceased to be regarded as God's eternal creations, as in the Platonic and theological traditions of the via antiqua, and became human products. Since about the time of Abaelard, theology has held that God created the world out of nothing and without the mediation of ideas. Consequently, ideas were no longer eternal realities, but only names (Latin: "nomen") for human inventions. Therefore, this approach is called "nominalism". To explain the invention of ideas, nominalism therefore for the first time conceded the divine gift of creativity to humans. Richard of St. Victor (ca. 1110–1173) was the first to present a theory of human creativity.

Gradually, his theory became popular. Since the Renaissance, a universal cult of creativity and innovation took hold of all areas of life in Western Europe, from the arts and sciences, to engineering and economics, to politics and fashion. The cult of creativity became the signature of modernity. With Machiavelli and the contract theorists, it opened political ideas to the wind of change. When the idea of innovation was translated into political practice, two new patterns of action emerged: reform and revolution. That is why modern societies, unlike traditional ones, are constantly in a state of flux.

===== The discovery of consciousness (8) =====
The eighth turn revolves around a central concept of experience itself: the concept of consciousness. In the history of experience, two pioneers accomplished the discovery of consciousness: Buddha and Descartes. The new concept initiated a radical reorientation of philosophical thought. Epistemology and the philosophy of consciousness now replaced metaphysics and ontology as basic disciplines. The Cartesian Revolution spread rapidly throughout Europe, initiating a series of repercussions.

Buddha analyzed consciousness to realize his project of liberation from suffering. Two millennia later, Descartes was initially concerned with finding a reliable method for scientific research. He discovered the res cogitans, the "thinking thing," as the unshakable foundation of this project, and identified consciousness as the nature of the res cogitans. From consciousness, John Locke developed his concept of personal identity: Individual identity is based on the biographical context of personal experience. Montesquieu and Voltaire expanded it into the collective identity of nations and cultures. Thus, collective identity is based on the historical shared experiences of smaller or larger groups.

The primacy of methodology also prevailed in the modern concept of political order. The constitution as a set of rules became the epitome of all political method. It replaced the onto-theological consensus on the divine order of power, sacred law and inherited privileges. The modern concept of republican order is based on the secondary consensus about the constitution.

===== The dimension of the unconscious (9) =====
The ninth turn developed in immediate succession to the eighth and is the discovery of the unconscious. The unconscious first appears as a dark reservoir beyond consciousness, a kind of inner transcendence from which conscious experience rises. While this dimension has long been indigenous to Buddhism and Hinduism, it has only become an integral part of Western experiential culture since the 19th century.

The Enlightenment considered the mind as a transparent terrain. Leibniz, however, doubted that all perceptions were permanently conscious to us. Ever more philosophers such as Hume, Wolff, and Platner shared his reservations. Alexander G. Baumgarten was the first to assign the unconscious a specific place in the psyche. He called it the "bottom of the soul." His idea quickly caught on.

At first, leading theorists such as Kant, Fichte, Schelling, and Hegel considered the unconscious to be only an intermediate stage on the way to conscious reflection. Finally, Schopenhauer realized that it was a genuine dimension. Thus, he created the first theory of the unconscious. By the middle of the nineteenth century, the unconscious was a popular idea, disseminated by Maine de Biran, Eduard von Hartmann, and Nietzsche in particular.

Sigmund Freud, however, was the first to go from theory to method. His method is well known as psychoanalysis. Carl Gustav Jung expanded the field by adding the archetypes and the collective unconscious. Political implementations emerged as mass psychology, advertising, propaganda, and public relations. These, in turn, have stimulated new theoretical approaches developed in particular by Pareto, Lasswell, Schumpeter and the Critical theory of the Frankfurt School.

===== More turns of experience to come? (10) =====
At the end of his study, Leidhold asks: Was the discovery of the unconscious also the last possible transformation? Has the history of experience come to an end? His answer is: there is no reason to think so. However, future directions are still uncertain. However, there is some speculation on the subject.

The Stoics already believed that the whole cosmos is a conscious living being, permeated by a "spirit" called "pneuma". Teilhard de Chardin hoped that the human spirit could get in touch with this cosmic pneuma – an idea recently taken up by Brian Swimme. Karl Gustav Jung and Wolfgang Pauli worked together all their lives on the striking phenomenon of synchronicity. Jung used this term to describe two (or more) temporally correlated events that are not linked by a causal relationship – such as when two people think of each other at the same time and then call each other synchronously. One of Jung's and Pauli's ideas was that this link could be based on quantum entanglement. Other researchers have also focused on the role of quantum physics. Since the 1960s and Eugene Wigner’s hypotheses, the idea emerged that the human brain and especially the mysterious phenomenon of consciousness are based on quantum mechanical principles. Physicists and physicians like David Bohm, Richard Penrose and Stuart Hameroff have further developed this quantum theory of consciousness. So far, there is neither consensus on future developments, nor are any of the above projects beyond controversy.

=== Ecology, experience and ethos ===
Leidhold's current projects explore the relationship between ecology and experience and the evolution of an ecological ethos. He is concerned with how the evolution of experience changes ecological consciousness. As the structure of experience changes, so does the way people view themselves and their place in the world. New institutions and cultures emerge, and with them the relationships between humankind and the environment change. These relationships depend not only on the material component of culture (technology, economy), but also on its mental component, the ethos. Ethos means, on the one hand, the place where a living being (human, animal, plant) usually lives, that is, is 'oikos'. It also means, on the other hand, the mental attitude that inspires its activities here in its oikos. The mental attitude is an ensemble of values, norms and rules, myth and history, ethics and morals, philosophical, religious and political ideas and ideologies. Ethos determines not only the relationship with the world of human life, but also with the entire cosmos, the planetary biosphere and the transhuman nooshpere. For all their differences politically, economically, and technologically, cultures from the era of prophetic religions to modern times were dominated by an anthropocentric ethos. The dominance defines the anthropocene epoch. Leidhold therefore points out that a sustainable response to the ecological challenges of our time can only succeed if a transhuman ecological ethos replaces the current anthropocentric ethos.

== Other activities ==
- 1981–1983: Development of the simulation games SINTAKTIKON and POL&IS
- 1986–1996: Founding and management of the "Researchgroup Simulations – FOGS e.V." (together with Claudia Floritz, Jörg Hahn, Thomas Sommer and Wolfgang Zauner)
- 1997–2001: Initiator and spokesperson of the project "Virtual Universitysystems – VIRTUS", sponsored by the foundations Bertelsmann and Nixdorf, as well as supported by the state of North Rhine-Westfalia and private sponsors
- Since 1997: Development of the online platform for teaching and scientific working "ILIAS"
- 1998–2000: Member of the "Body of Experts for the Development of Higher Education with New Media" of the Bertelsmann Foundation
- 1999–2000: Advisory activity for the expert board for the evaluation of the universities of North Rhine-Westphalia
- 2001–2004: Initiator and consortium leader of the statewide project "Political Sciences Online – POLITIKON" in cooperation with the German Association for Political Sciences
- 2001–2005: Member of the commission "New Media and Transfer of Knowledge" of the conference of university rectors.
- 2001–2008: Head of several projects like JOIN!, SHARE, OpenDock, BAZAAR, evoLearn, funded by the European Community
- 2007–2011: Head or participant of several projects like Biotechnologie im Wertewandel (Diskurs ELSA), Unirep-Online, Demo-Credit (XENOS-Projektreihe), funded by the federal government
- Since 2011: Initiator and head of the cooperation network Global Theory Network
- Since 2013: Head of the project Modern Art and the Political Discourse in cooperation with Boris Lurie Art Foundation, New York

== Reception and impact ==
Leidhold's international reception is documented in a Festschrift in his honor, published in 2021 under the title "Experience – Implications for Man, Society, and Politics". His study "The History of Experience" was reviewed by Melissa Lane (Princeton) as a "bold, creative, and thought-provoking work" and Michael Allen Gillespie (Duke University) called it "a masterpiece". Widely received were Leidhold's publications on Francis Hutcheson, especially his critical edition of and introduction to the latter's "Inquiry into the Original of Our Ideas of Beauty and Virtue," which according to Researchgate statistics is among the top 1% of scholarly book publications listed there. Various positive reviews appeared on his books "Political Philosophy" and "God's Presence". The learning platform ILIAS, designed and initiated by Leidhold, has been in use internationally for more than 25 years at numerous universities, academies and institutions of continuing education and is also increasingly being used by companies and administrative organizations for training and continuing education.

== Bibliography ==
=== Monographies ===
- Gottes Gegenwart, Zur Logik der religiösen Erfahrung, Darmstadt 2008, ISBN 978-3-534-21046-6
- Francis Hutcheson, An Inquiry into the Original of Our Ideas of Beauty and Virtue in two treatises, ed. and introd. by Wolfgang Leidhold, 2. rev. ed., Indianapolis, In. 2008, ISBN 978-0-86597-774-7
- Demokratie – Chancen und Herausforderungen im 21. Jahrhundert, Wolfgang Leidhold, André Kaiser (Hrsg.), Münster (u. a.) 2005, ISBN 3-8258-8001-X
- Politische Philosophie, 2. verb. Aufl., Würzburg 2003, ISBN 3-8260-2755-8
- Krise unter dem Kreuz des Südens, Die Pazifische Inselregion und die internationale Sicherheit, Internationale Politik und Sicherheit, Bd. 27, Baden-Baden 1991, ISBN 3-7890-2298-5
- Ethik und Politik bei Francis Hutcheson, Praktische Philosophie, Bd. 21, Freiburg 1985, ISBN 3-495-47558-3

=== Papers and other contributions ===
- History and Experience, in: S. Fink, R. Rollinger, Hg., Oswald Spenglers Kulturmorphologie, Eine multiperspektivische Annäherung, Wiesbaden 2018, pp. 489–521.
- Architektur als symbolische Form, in: (Un)Möglich! – Künstler als Architekten, Herford 2015, pp. 76–77.
- Wege und Abwege in die transparente Gesellschaft, Von der Geschichte und Gegenwart der digitalen Kultur, in: Die politische Meinung, Sankt Augustin 2014 (526), pp. 12–18:
- Towards a History of Experience, the Changing Structure of Conscious Participation, APSA 2012.
- The Noetic Turn: from Zarathustra to the Wisdom of Salomon, APSA 2011.
- Demokratie, Religion, Erfahrung, in: Elke-Vera Kotowski, Reinhard Sonnenschmidt (Hg.), Grenzgänge zwischen Politik und Religion, München 2009, pp. 13–32.
- Alles fließt, Zur Metaphysik des Werdens, Heraklit versus Parmenides, in: Jörg Martin (Hrsg.), Welt im Fluss, Fallstudien zum Modell der Homöostase, Stuttgart 2008, S. 43–56.
- Wahrheit und Entscheidung, in: Petra Huse, Ingmar Dette (Hrsg.), Abenteuer des Geistes – Dimensionen des Politischen, Festschrift für Walter Rotholz, Baden-Baden 2008, S. 303–311.
- Rationality – What Else? in: Marcel van Ackeren, Orrin Finn Summerrell (eds.), The Political Identity of the West, Platonism in the Dialogue of Cultures, Frankfurt am Main (u. a.) 2006, S. 189–199.
- Vernunft, Erfahrung, Religion, Anmerkungen zu John Lockes’ Reasonableness of Christianity, in: Lothar Kreimendahl (Hrsg.), Aufklärung, Interdisziplinäres Jahrbuch zur Erforschung des 18. Jahrhunderts und seiner Wirkungsgeschichte Band 18, Hamburg 2006, S. 159–178.
- Mythos und Logos, in: Marcel van Ackeren, Jörn Müller (Hrsg.), Antike Philosophie verstehen, Understanding Ancient Philosophy, Darmstadt 2006, S. 72–86.
- Aristoteles (384-322 v. Chr.), in: Wilhelm Bleek, Hans J. Lietzmann (Hrsg.), Klassiker der Politikwissenschaft, Von Aristoteles bis David Easton, München 2005, S. 19–32.
- John Balguy, in: Helmut Holzhey, Vilem Mudroch (Hrsg.), Großbritannien, Nordamerika, Niederlande, Die Philosophie des 18. Jahrhunderts, Bd. 1, Basel 2004, S. 142–144.
- Joseph Butler, in: Helmut Holzhey, Vilem Mudroch (Hrsg.), Großbritannien, Nordamerika, Niederlande, Die Philosophie des 18. Jahrhunderts, Bd. 1, Basel 2004, S. 153–163.
- Gerschom Carmichael, in: Helmut Holzhey, Vilem Mudroch (Hrsg.), Großbritannien, Nordamerika, Niederlande, Die Philosophie des 18. Jahrhunderts, Bd. 1, Basel 2004, S. 139–142.
- Francis Hutcheson, in: Helmut Holzhey, Vilem Mudroch (Hrsg.), Großbritannien, Nordamerika, Niederlande, Die Philosophie des 18. Jahrhunderts, Bd. 1, Basel 2004, S. 125–139.
- William Leechman, in: Helmut Holzhey, Vilem Mudroch (Hrsg.), Großbritannien, Nordamerika, Niederlande, Die Philosophie des 18. Jahrhunderts, Bd. 1, Basel 2004, S. 150–153.
- John Taylor, in: Helmut Holzhey, Vilem Mudroch (Hrsg.), Großbritannien, Nordamerika, Niederlande, Die Philosophie des 18. Jahrhunderts, Bd. 1, Basel 2004, S. 144–146.
- George Turnbull, in: Helmut Holzhey, Vilem Mudroch (Hrsg.), Großbritannien, Nordamerika, Niederlande, Die Philosophie des 18. Jahrhunderts, Bd. 1, Basel 2004, S. 146–150.
- Wissensgesellschaft, in: Karl-Rudolf Korte, Werner Weidenfeld (Hrsg.), Deutschland-TrendBuch, Fakten und Orientierungen, Opladen 2001, S. 429–460.
- Das kreative Projekt, Genealogie und Begriff, in: Harald Bluhm, Jürgen Gebhardt (Hrsg.), Konzepte politischen Handelns, Kreativität – Innovation – Praxen, Baden-Baden 2001, S. 51–72.
- Über die Zeit, in: Andreas Pigulla, Christine Moll-Murata, Iris Hasselberg (Hrsg.), Ostasien verstehen, Peter Weber-Schäfer zu Ehren, Festschrift aus Anlaß seiner Emeritierung, München 2000, S. 201–216.
- Aristoteles, Politikwissenschaft und praktische Philosophie, in: Wolfgang Leidhold (Hrsg.), Politik und Politeia, Formen und Probleme politischer Ordnung, Festgabe für Jürgen Gebhardt zum 65. Geburtstag, Würzburg 2000, S. 423–444.
- Francis Hutcheson, in: Lothar Kreimendahl (Hrsg.), Philosophen des 18. Jahrhunderts, eine Einführung, Darmstadt 2000, S. 87–103.
- Tendenzen und Konzepte einer neuen Weltordnung – über Prinzipien und Komponenten globaler Ordnungsmodell, in: Politisches Denken, Jahrbuch 1997, Stuttgart (u. a.) 1997, S. 75–100.
- Die Neuentdeckung der Alten Welt, Machiavelli und die Analyse der internationalen Beziehungen, in: Der Staat 2 (1992), S. 187–204.
- Das amerikanische Parteiensystem zwischen Erosion und Erneuerung, Von der "Krise der amerikanischen Parteien" zur Service-Partei, in: Zeitschrift für Politik 37 (1990), S. 361–374.
- Eric Voegelin, zus. mit Jürgen Gebhardt, in: Karl Graf Ballestrem u. Henning Ottmann (Hrsg.), Politische Philosophie des 20. Jahrhunderts, Oldenbourg 1990, S. 123–145.
- Historiengenesis – Politogenese, Zur Analyse von Entstehung, Ordnung und Selbst-interpretation politischer Ensemble, in: Peter Hampe (Bearb.), Symbol- und Ordnungsformen im Zivilisationsvergleich, Wissenschaftliches Symposion in Memoriam Eric Voegelin, Tutzing 1990, S. 59–92.
