= Flex model of learning =

The flex model is a method of teaching for students who are non-traditional learners. Learning material and instructions are given online and the lessons are self-guided. The teacher is available on-site. The students work independently and learn to develop and create new concepts in a digital environment. They work in computer labs most of the time. The schedules of learning modalities are customized individually and the teacher-of-record is on-site. Though most of the instructions are given online, the face-to-face support as needed by the student is given by the teacher-of-records and adults through activities such as group projects, small group instruction and individual tutoring. This model provides the students a flexible learning environment. They are free to arrive and leave the learning premises within the given timing of the day. The teacher in this model acts as a mentor and give equal importance in delivering the proper instruction to the students.

== Reception ==
Flex learning has been shown to have a number of potential advantages and disadvantages for students. Some advantages of flex learning include the ability for students to carry out the learning process at their own pace. their attention may be held better, credit accumulation during the course of learning is facilitated, and the ability for schools to operate at a lower cost compared to alternative schools.

Some disadvantages of flex learning include the demand for larger spaces and many devices, and for students to have reliable access to digital devices and fast internet.

== See also ==
- Blended learning
- Distance learning
- Educational technology
- Personalized learning
- Rotation model of learning
- Self-blended model of learning
