= Mastery learning =

Instructional strategy and educational philosophy

Mastery learning is an instructional strategy and educational philosophy that emphasizes the importance of students achieving a high level of competence (e.g., 90% accuracy) in prerequisite knowledge before moving on to new material. This approach involves providing students with individualized support and repeated opportunities to demonstrate mastery through assessments. If a student does not initially achieve mastery, they receive additional instruction and support until they do. Mastery learning is based on the idea that all students can learn effectively with appropriate instruction and sufficient time, and it contrasts with traditional teaching methods that often focus on covering a set amount of material within a fixed timeframe, regardless of individual student needs.

== Definition ==
Mastery learning (or, as it was initially called, "learning for mastery"; also known as "mastery-based learning") is an instructional strategy and educational philosophy, first formally proposed by Benjamin Bloom in 1968. Mastery learning maintains that students must achieve a level of mastery (e.g., 90% on a knowledge test) in prerequisite knowledge before moving forward to learn subsequent information. If a student does not achieve mastery on the test, they are given additional support in learning and reviewing the information and then tested again. This cycle continues until the learner accomplishes mastery, and they may then move on to the next stage. In a self-paced online learning environment, students study the material and take assessments. If they make mistakes, the system provides insightful explanations and directs them to revisit the relevant sections. They then answer different questions on the same material, and this cycle repeats until they reach the established mastery threshold. Only then can they move on to subsequent learning modules, assessments, or certifications.

Mastery-based learning methods emphasize that instruction should be tailored to the individual time needed for each student to master the same content. This is very much in contrast with classic models of teaching that focus on varying student abilities and allocation of equal time and instructions irrespective of the students' unique needs. Mastery learning shifts the perspective, attributing student challenges to instructional methods rather than inherent abilities. This underscores the importance of individualized teacher-student interactions over group evaluations. Therefore, the task in mastery learning is to ensure sufficient time and employ effective instructional strategies so that all students can achieve the same level of learning. This learner-centered approach also aligns with andragogy principles as well, recognizing that adult learners benefit from tailored instruction and assessments that are inclusive and supportive, fostering a fair and non-oppressive learning experience.

Since its conception, mastery learning has empirically been demonstrated to be effective in improving education outcomes in a variety of settings. Its effectiveness is influenced by the subject being taught, whether testing is designed locally or nationally, course pace and the amount of feedback provided to students. Research has identified an average effect size of 0.59, which demonstrates moderate to substantial improvements in academic performance with Mastery Learning. Higher mastery thresholds have been associated with greater improvements in examination performance, and the use of targeted feedback has been shown to address learning gaps and misconceptions effectively. Additionally, since the model uses elements such as autonomy and competence, which are thought to enhance student motivation and engagement, this is said to be another reason for the potential success of the model in specific circumstances.

=== Motivation ===
The motivation for mastery learning comes from trying to reduce achievement gaps for students in average school classrooms. During the 1960s John B. Carroll and Benjamin S. Bloom pointed out that, if students are normally distributed with respect to aptitude for a subject and if they are provided uniform instruction (in terms of quality and learning time), then achievement level at completion of the subject is also expected to be normally distributed. This can be illustrated as shown below:

Comparison between normal curve for aptitude and normal curve for achievement after learning

Mastery Learning approaches propose that, if each learner were to receive optimal quality of instruction and as much learning time as they require, then a majority of students could be expected to attain mastery. This situation would be represented as follows:

Comparison between normal curve for aptitude and normal curve for achievement after optimal learning

In many situations educators preemptively use the normal curve for grading students. Bloom was critical of this usage, condemning it because it creates expectation by the teachers that some students will naturally be successful while others will not. Bloom contended that, if educators are effective, the distribution of achievement could and should be very different from the normal curve. Bloom proposed Mastery Learning as a way to address this. He believed that by using his approach, the majority of students (more than 90 percent) would achieve successful and rewarding learning. As an added advantage, Mastery Learning was also thought to create more positive interest and attitude towards the subject learned if compared with usual classroom methods.

=== Related terms ===
Individualized instruction has some elements in common with mastery learning, although it dispenses with group activities in favor of allowing more capable or more motivated students to progress ahead of others while maximizing teacher interaction with those students who need the most assistance.

Bloom's 2 Sigma Problem is an educational phenomenon observed where the average student tutored one-to-one (using mastery learning techniques) performed two standard deviations better than students who learn via conventional instructional methods.

Competency-based learning is a framework for the assessment of learning based on predetermined competencies. It draws inspiration from mastery learning.

== History ==
In the 1920s, efforts to promote mastery in students' learning included the Winnetka Plan, by Carleton Washburne and associates, and Henry C. Morrison's experimental methods at the University of Chicago Laboratory School which emphasized individualized instruction and student-paced learning over rigid course completion. These attempts were centered around student proficiency rather than course completion which helped pave the way for modern mastery learning models. While these ideas were popular for a while, they faded due primarily to the lack of technologies that could sustain a successful implementation.

The idea of mastery learning resurfaced in the late 1950s and early 1960s as a corollary of programmed instruction, a technology invented by B.F. Skinner to improve teaching. At the core of programmed instruction was Skinner's belief that even the most complex behaviors could be taught by breaking them into smaller, manageable components, each learned sequentially with guided reinforcement.

Around that same time, John B. Carroll was working on his "Model of School Learning" - a conceptual paradigm which outlined the major factors influencing student success in school learning and indicating how these factors interacted. Carroll's model stemmed from his previous work with foreign language learning. He found that a student's aptitude for a language predicted not only the level to which they learned in a given time, but also the amount of time they required to learn to a given level. Carroll then suggests that aptitudes are actually a way to measure the amount of time required to learn a task up to a certain level (under ideal instructional conditions). As such, Carroll's model implies that, if each student is given the sufficient time they needed to learn to any particular level, then they would be expected to attain it.

Later in the 1960s Benjamin Bloom and his graduate students were researching individual differences in school learning. They observed that teachers displayed very little variation in their instructional practices and yet, there was a lot of variation in student's achievements. Bloom used Carroll's conceptual model to create his own working model of Mastery Learning. Bloom realized that, if aptitudes were predictive of the rate at which a student can learn (and not necessarily the level to which), each student can grow at their own pace resulting in a more personalized learning environment. This way, each student can reach their learning potential at their own speed.

Also in the 1960s, Fred S. Keller was collaborating with colleagues developing his own instructional methods of Mastery Learning. Keller's strategies were based on the ideas of reinforcement as seen in operant conditioning theories. Keller formally introduced his teaching method, Personalized System of Instruction (PSI) - sometimes referred to as Keller Plan), in his 1967 paper, "Engineering personalized instruction in the classroom". In this plan, Keller expands on how each student progresses at their own pace with no risk of complete failure, since they can retake the assessments until they have achieved full mastery. Keller's version of Mastery Learning led to 90% of the students tested to state that they learn more, they have more fun while learning, and they have a greater sense of accomplishment, even though they had to work harder.

From the late 1960s to the early 1980s, there was a surge of research on both Keller's and Bloom's instruction methods. Most of these studies showed that mastery learning has a positive effect on achievement, for all subjects and at all levels. Also, mastery learning brings positive affective outcomes for both students and teachers. These studies also showed that there are many variables that are either affected by mastery learning or that influence it somehow: student entry variables, curriculum, type of test, pacing, level of mastery, and time.

Despite those mostly positive research results, interest in mastery learning strategies decreased throughout the 1980s, as reflected in publication activity in professional journals and presentations at conferences. Many explanations were put forward to justify this decline, like alleged recalcitrance of the educational establishment to change, or the ineffective implementations of mastery learning methods, or the extra time demanded in setting up and maintaining a mastery learning course or even concerns that behavioristic-based models for teaching would conflict with the generally humanistic-oriented teachers and the surrounding culture.

Mastery learning strategies are best represented by Bloom's Learning For Mastery (LFM) and Keller's Personalized System of Instruction (PSI). Bloom's approach was focused in the schoolroom, whereas Keller developed his system for higher education. Both have been applied in many different contexts and have been found to be very powerful methods for increasing student performance in a wide range of activities. Despite sharing some commonalities in terms of goals, they are built on different psychological principles.

== Learning For Mastery (LFM) ==
=== Variables of LFM ===
Bloom, when first proposing his mastery learning strategy in 1968, was convinced that most students can attain a high level of learning capability if the following conditions are available:

- instruction is approached sensitively and systematically
- students are helped when and where they have learning difficulties
- students are given sufficient time to achieve mastery
- there is some clear criterion of what constitutes mastery.

Many variables will influence achievement levels and learning outcomes:

==== Aptitude ====
Aptitude, measured by standard aptitude tests, in this context is interpreted as "the amount of time required by the learner to attain mastery of a learning task". Several studies show that majority of students can achieve mastery in a learning task, but the time that they need to spend on is different. Bloom argues that there are 1 to 5 percent of students who have special talent for learning a subject (especially music and foreign languages) and there are also around five percent of students who have special disability for learning a subject. For other 90% of students, aptitude is merely an indicator of the rate of learning. Additionally, Bloom argues that aptitude for a learning task is not constant and can be changed by environmental conditions or learning experience at school or home.

==== Quality of instruction ====
The quality of instruction is defined as the degree to which the presentation, explanation, and ordering of elements of the task to be learned approach the optimum for a given learner. Bloom insists that the quality of instruction has to be evaluated according to its effect on individual students rather than on random groups of students. Bloom shows that while in traditional classrooms, the relationship between students' aptitude test for mathematics and their final grade in algebra is very high, this relationship is almost zero for students who are receiving tutorial instruction in the home. He argues that a good tutor tries to find the quality of learning best fit to the given students, thus the majority of students would be able to master a subject if they have access to a good tutor.

==== Ability to understand instruction ====
According to Bloom the ability to understand instruction is defined as the nature of the task that a learner is to learn and the procedure that the learner is to follow. Verbal ability and reading comprehension are two language abilities that are highly related to student achievements. Since the ability to understand instruction varies significantly among students, Bloom recommends that teachers modify their instruction, provide help, and teaching aids to fit the needs of different students. Some of the teaching aids that could be provided according to the ability of the learner are:

- Alternative Textbooks
- Group Studies and Peer Tutoring
- Workbooks
- Programmed Instruction Units
- Audiovisual Methods
- Academic Games
- Laboratory experiences
- Simple demonstrations
- Puzzles

==== Perseverance ====
Perseverance in this context is defined as the time the learner is willing to spend in learning. According to Bloom, a student who demonstrates a low level of perseverance in one learning task might have a very high level of perseverance in a different learning task. He suggests that students' perseverance be enhanced by increasing the frequency of reward and providing evidence of success in learning. He recommends that teachers use frequent feedback accompanied by specific help to improve the quality of instruction, thus reducing the perseverance required for learning.

==== Time allowed for learning ====
According to the International Study of Education in 12 countries, if the top 5% of students are omitted, the ratio of the time needed for slower and faster learners of a subject such as mathematics is 6 to 1 while there is zero or slightly negative relationship between the final grades and the amount of time spent on homework. Thus, the amount of time spent on homework is not a good indicator of mastery in a subject. Bloom postulates that the time required for a learner to achieve mastery in a specific subject is affected by various factors such as:

- the student's aptitude for that subject,
- The student's verbal ability,
- the quality of instruction, and
- the quality of the help provided.

=== LFM strategy ===
LFM curricula generally consists of discrete topics which all students begin together. After beginning a unit, students will be given a meaningful and formative assessment so that the teacher can conclude whether or not an objective has been mastered. At this step, instruction goes in one of two directions. If a student has mastered an objective, he or she will begin on a path of enrichment activities that correspond to and build upon the original objective. Students who do not satisfactorily complete a topic are given additional instruction until they succeed. If a student does not demonstrate that he or she has mastered the objective, then a series of correctives will be employed. These correctives can include varying activities, individualized instruction, and additional time to complete assignments. These students will receive constructive feedback on their work and will be encouraged to revise and revisit their assignment until the objective is mastered.

==== Preconditions ====
There are several preconditions for the process of mastery learning. Firstly, the objectives and content of instruction must be clearly specified and communicated to both students and teachers. Additionally, summative evaluation criteria should be developed, ensuring that both the teacher and the learner understand the achievement benchmarks. Bloom suggests that employing absolute standards, rather than competitive criteria, fosters collaboration among students and facilitates mastery.

==== Operating procedures ====
The operating procedures are the methods used to provide detailed feedback and instructional help to facilitate the process of mastery in learning. The main operation procedures are:

- Formative Evaluation, and
- Alternative Learning Resources

===== Formative evaluation =====
Formative Evaluation in the context of mastery learning is a diagnostic progress tests to determine whether or not the student has mastered the subject unit. Each unit is usually a learning outcome that could be taught in a week or two of learning activity. The formative tests are administered at the learning units. Bloom insists that the diagnostic process has to be followed by a prescription and the result of formative assessment is better to express in not-grade format since the use of grades on repeated progress evaluations prepare students for accepting a level of learning less than mastery.

===== Alternative learning resources =====
The progress tests should be followed by detailed feedback and specific suggestions so that the students could work on their difficulties. Some of the alternative learning resources are:

- Small groups of students (two or three) meet and work together
- Tutorial help
- Reviewing the instructional material
- Reading alternative textbooks
- Using workbook or programmed texts
- Using selected audiovisual materials

==== Outcomes ====
The outcomes of mastery learning could be summarized into two groups: 1- Cognitive Outcomes 2- Affective Outcomes

===== Cognitive outcomes =====
The cognitive outcomes of mastery learning are mainly related to increase in student excellence in a subject. According to one study, applying the strategies of mastery learning in a class resulted in the increase of students with the grade of A from 20 percent to 80 percent (about two standard deviation), and using the formative evaluation records as a base for quality control helped the teacher to improve the strategies and increase the percent of students with a grade of A to 90% in the following year.

===== Affective outcomes =====
Affective outcomes of mastery are mainly related to the sense of self-efficacy and confidence in the learners. Bloom argues that when the society (through education system) recognizes a learner's mastery, profound changes happen in his or her view of self and the outer world. The learner would start believing that he or she is able to adequately cope with problems, would have higher motivation for learning the subject in a higher level of expertise, and would have a better mental state due to less feeling of frustration. Finally, it is argued that in a modern society lifelong learning is a necessity, and mastery learning can develop a lifelong interest and motivation in learning.

== Personalized System of Instruction (PSI) ==
Personalized System of Instruction, also known as the Keller Plan, was developed in the mid 1960s by Fred Keller and colleagues. It was developed based on the idea of reinforcement in teaching processes.

Keller gives the following description to a group of psychology students enrolled in his course developed using mastery learning theory: "This is a course through which you may move, from start to finish, at your own pace. You will not be held back by other students or forced to go ahead until you are ready. At best, you may meet all the course requirements in less than one semester; at worst, you may not complete the job within that time. How fast you go is up to you" (Keller, 1968, pg 80-81).

=== Five elements of PSI ===
There are five main elements in PSI as described in Keller's paper from 1967:

1. "The go-at-your-own-pace feature, which permits a student to move through the course at a speed commensurate with his ability and other demands upon his time.
2. The unit-perfection requirement for advance, which lets the student go ahead to new material only after demonstrating mastery of that which preceded.
3. The use of lectures and demonstrations as vehicles of motivation, rather than sources of critical information.
4. The related stress upon the written word in teacher-student communication.
5. The use of proctors, which permits repeated testing, immediate scoring, almost unavoidable tutoring, and a marked enhancement of the personal-social aspect of the educational process".

== Assessment ==
In a mastery learning environment, the teacher directs a variety of group-based instructional techniques, with frequent and specific feedback by using diagnostic, formative tests, as well as regularly correcting mistakes students make along their learning path. Assessment in the mastery learning classroom is not used as a measure of accountability but rather as a source of evidence to guide future instruction. A teacher using the mastery approach will use the evidence generated from his or her assessment to modify activities to best serve each student. Teachers evaluate students with criterion-referenced tests rather than norm-referenced tests. In this sense, students are not competing against each other, but rather competing against themselves in order to achieve a personal best.

== Criticism ==
=== Time-achievement equality dilemma ===
The goal of mastery learning is to have all students reach a prescribed level of mastery (i.e. 80–90% on a test). In order to achieve this, some students will require more time than others, either in practice or instruction, to achieve success. The Time-Achievement Equality Dilemma refers to this relationship between time and achievement in the context of individual differences. If achievement is held constant, time will need to vary. If time is held constant (as with modern learning models), achievement will vary. According to its critics, mastery theory doesn't accurately address this relationship.

Bloom's original theory assumes that with practice, the slower learners will become faster learners, and the gap of individual differences will disappear. Bloom believes these differences in learning pace occur because of lack of prerequisite knowledge and if all children have the same prerequisite knowledge, then learning will progress at the same rate. Bloom places the blame on teaching settings where students aren't given enough time to reach mastery levels in prerequisite knowledge before moving on to the new lesson. He also uses this to explain why variance in student learning is smaller in the first grade when compared to students in the 7th grade (the smart get smarter, and the slower fall further behind). He referred to this learning rate variance as the Vanishing Point.

A four-year longitudinal study by Arlin (1984) found no indication of a vanishing point in students who learned arithmetic through a mastery approach. Students who required extra assistance to learn material in the first year of the study required relatively the same amount of additional instruction in the 4th year. Individual differences in learning rates appear to be impacted by more than just method of instruction, contrary to Bloom's opinions.

=== Methodology errors in research ===
==== Experimental vs. control groups ====
In studies investigating the effectiveness of mastery learning, control and experimental groups were not always valid. Experimental groups typically consisted of courses that were developed to adhere to the best principles of mastery. However, control groups were sometimes existing classes to use as a comparison. This poses a problem since there was no way to test the effectiveness of the control group to begin with - it could have been a poorly constructed course being compared against a strictly designed mastery course.

==== Measurement tools ====
In studies where the largest effect sizes were found, experimenter-made tests were used to test the mastery levels of students in the experiments. By using tests designed for the experiment, the mastery instruction intervention may have been able to better tailor the learning goals of the class to align with the measurement tool. Conversely, these dramatic effect sizes essentially disappeared when standardized tests were used to measure mastery levels in control and experimental groups

==== Study duration ====
There are very few studies that investigate the long-term effects of mastery learning. Many studies included an arbitrary 3-4 week intervention period and results were based on findings from this time period. It's important to consider the length of time students were immersed in a mastery learning program to get a greater understanding of the long-term effects of this teaching strategy.

=== General concerns and opinions ===
Typical mastery programs involve providing class instruction then testing using reliable tools (i.e. multiple-choice unit test). This format of learning may only be beneficial to learners who are interested in surface rather than deep processing of information. This contradicts many of today's modern learning approaches which focus less on direct assessment of knowledge, and more on creating meaningful applications and interpretations of the obtained knowledge (see Constructivism (philosophy of education))

The Chicago Mastery Learning Reading program was criticized for a focus on testing. A concern is that children were taught to pass tests without a focus on enduring skills. The duration of the retention of skills was questioned. A love of reading was not promoted. Students rarely read books or stories. Student failure was an aspect of the program design. 80% was required on 80% of the test to pass. This resulted in huge retention levels. Ultimately, the program was not practical to implement.

The value of having all children achieve mastery brings into question our general view of success. If the goal of education became having children become experts, grades would become much less varied. That is, you would theoretically have a high school graduating class all with grades above 90%. Universities would have to make selections from a pool of applicants with similar grades, how would admission requirements have to change to account for uniform ratings of intelligence? Would time it took to reach mastery become a new measure of success? These questions about the wider implications of mastery as a new standard raise discussion about its actual value.

== Mastery learning today ==
Mastery Learning has been one of the most highly investigated teaching methods over the past 50 years. While it has been the subject of high criticism, it has also been found to have resounding success when implemented correctly. A meta-analysis by Guskey & Pigott (1988) looked at 46 studies that implemented group-based mastery learning classrooms, finding positive effects for a number of variables including "student achievement, retention of learned material, involvement in learning activities, and student affect". However, a notable variation was found within student achievement and it was believed this was due mainly to the subject being taught. Courses such as science, probability, and social studies yielded the most consistent positive results, while other subjects were varied.

Another large-scale meta-analysis conducted by Kulik et al. (1990) investigated 108 studies of mastery programs being implemented at the elementary, secondary, and post-secondary level. Results revealed positive effects in favour of these teaching strategies, with students also reporting positive attitudes toward this style of learning. This study also found mastery programs to be most effective for weaker students.

Despite the empirical evidence, many mastery programs in schools have been replaced by more traditional forms of instruction due to the level of commitment required by the teacher and the difficulty in managing the classroom when each student is following an individual course of learning. However, the central tenets of mastery learning are still found in today's teaching strategies such as differentiated instruction and understanding by design.

Researchers at Northwestern University led by Drs. Diane Wayne, Jeff Barsuk and William McGaghie pioneered the use of mastery learning in the health professions. In 2006 they investigated mastery learning vs. traditional medical education in advanced cardiac life support techniques and showed that internal medicine resident trainees significantly improved adherence to American Heart Association protocols after mastery training. Subsequent investigations showed improved patient care practices as a result of this rigorous education including reduced patient complications and healthcare costs. These effects on patient care were seen in operating rooms, cardiac catheterization lab, intensive care units and patient floors at a large urban teaching hospital in Chicago. Further study also involved communication skills such as breaking bad news and end of life discussions, and patient self-management skills. In 2020 the Northwestern group published an important textbook entitled Mastery Learning in Health Professions Education. The approach designed by Northwestern investigators is currently in use at other health care institutions and medical schools throughout the US and the world.

In engineering education, mastery learning has been adapted by Daniel Oerther for use in environmental engineering courses, combining required mastery quizzes on prerequisite knowledge with optional summative assessments to determine final grades - a process he calls "modified mastery learning". The approach has been documented across multiple ASEE Annual Conference papers and in Environmental Engineering Science, and is referenced as an engineering teaching resource by the Teaching Experiment Academy at the University of California, Irvine.

In 2012, Jonathan Bergmann and Aaron Sams published the book Flip Your Classroom, Reach Every Student in Every Class Every Day. The second half of the book was dedicated to how to implement what they called the Flipped-Mastery Model. They merged mastery learning with flipped learning and saw significant results. The book has spurred many teachers across the world to adopt the Flipped-Mastery approach. Bergmann and Sams show that the logistical problems associated with setting up a mastery learning program are now solved by technology. If teachers have to deliver direct instruction, this can be time-shifted with either an instructional video or a flipped-reading assignment. The issue of multiple assessments is also solved by programs that allow for testing to be much more seamless and less burdensome. Jonathan Bergmann extended Mastery Learning in the publication of (ASCD, 2023).

== See also ==
- Bloom's 2 sigma problem – Educational phenomenon of greatly improved performance by tutored learners
- Flipped classroom – Instructional strategy and a type of blended learning
- Evidence-based education – Paradigm of the education field
- Instructional design – Process for design and development of learning resources
- Khan Academy – Nonprofit educational organization
- Kumon – Educational company based in Japan
- Bloom's taxonomy – Classification system in education
- Competency-based learning – Framework for teaching and assessment of learning
