= Rotation model of learning =

The rotation model of learning involves the traditional face-to-face learning with online learning. In this, the time schedule is divided and fixed between these two processes or it runs on the teacher's discretion for a given course. The classroom kids usually monitors both the face-to-face and online learning, and the online learning takes place on a one-to-one basis. Students rotate across online learning, small group instruction and pencil-pen assignments. This model includes four sub-models:

1. Station rotation: a rotation model in which for a given course or the subject, the student rotates on a fixed schedule or at teacher's discretion one online learning station to another which might be activities such as small group instruction, group projects, and individual tutoring. It differs from individual-rotation model.
2. Lab-rotation model: The student rotates to a brick and mortar computer lab for online learning station.
3. Flipped-classroom model: In this, the students rotate on a fixed schedule or at a teacher's discretion across the classroom learning and online learning after the school hours. The online learning acts as a primary source for the content to be taught in the next day's class.
4. Individual-rotation model: In this rotation model, the teacher sets individual timing for the students for rotation among different learning modalities. It differs from other rotation models as the student doesn't have to rotate to each available station.

Station rotation, lab-rotation, and flipped-classroom rotation are to be considered truly blended or hybrid classrooms while individual-rotation model borders on a more typical online classroom. Station, lab, and flipped-classroom rotations are considered to be blended, or hybrid classrooms, because they meet the four criteria; they represent an integration of old and new styles, they are designed with traditional mainstream curriculum in mind with the addition of online content, they keep students in their seats in traditional brick-and-mortar classrooms, and they are not simpler versions of the class but integrated classrooms where the teacher still needs expertise from traditional styles. The individual-rotation model, while considered a blended classroom, really falls closer to online learning. The curriculum is built for the individual, meaning that students could independently work completely online if this style suits them.

Over all the rotation model of learning consists of the following components:

- Personalized online instruction
- Teacher led small group instruction
- Independent and collaborative practice

== Role of teacher ==
In the rotation model, teachers navigate the program in such a way that they would be aware of the issues faced by the students during their independent work time, which helps in designing assessment tools to monitor their students' learning path. Teachers should follow certain guidelines to assist the students to use computers effectively, appropriately and safely. Teachers should be always prepared for technical issues or the power outages coming up between or before the class. They should address the behaviour of the students on the computer. The physical layout of the class should be designed for the transition happening during the rotations.

== Advantages ==
This model helps the students to receive differentiated experiences from face-to-face learning to online learning along with independent and collaborative practice. This model helps students to learn on their own pace and researchers have shown that these students out performs the students who have exposure only to one type of instruction.

== See also ==
- Distance learning
- Flex model of learning
- Learning environment
- Pedagogy
- Self-blended model of learning
