= Bloom's 2 sigma problem =

Educational phenomenon of greatly improved performance by tutored learners

Bloom's 2 sigma problem refers to the educational phenomenon that the average student tutored one-to-one using mastery learning techniques performed two standard deviations better than students educated in a classroom environment. It was originally observed by educational psychologist Benjamin Bloom and reported in 1984 in the journal Educational Researcher. Bloom's paper analyzed the dissertation results of University of Chicago PhD students Joanne Anania and Joseph Arthur Burke. Bloom reported that "the average tutored student was above 98% of the students in the control class". Additionally, the variation of the students' achievement changed: "about 90% of the tutored students ... attained the level of summative achievement reached by only the highest 20%" of the control class.

The phenomenon's associated problem, as described by Bloom, was to "find methods of group instruction as effective as one-to-one tutoring". The phenomenon has also been used to illustrate that factors outside of a teacher's control influence student education outcomes, and it has motivated research in alternative teaching methods, some of which has reported larger standard deviation improvements than those predicted by the phenomenon. The phenomenon has also motivated developments in human-computer interaction for education, including cognitive tutors and learning management systems.

== Mastery learning ==
Mastery learning is an educational philosophy first proposed by Bloom in 1968. It is based on the premise that students must achieve a level of mastery (e.g., 90% on a knowledge test) in prerequisite knowledge before moving forward to learn subsequent information on a topic. Mastery is determined with regular tests, and students who do not yet achieve mastery on the test are given additional educational support before another test. This cycle continues until the learner accomplishes mastery, and they may then move on to the next stage. Unlike in conventional educational testing, a student's failure to achieve mastery is attributed to instruction rather than to a lack of student ability. Another key element of mastery learning is that it requires attention to individual students as opposed to assessing group performance. Evidence suggests that mastery learning is effective in improving student educational outcomes.

Two of the three groups in the original study by Bloom used mastery learning, while the third, a control group, did not.

== Correlations ==
Though Bloom concluded that one-to-one tutoring is "too costly for most societies to bear on a large scale", he conjectured that a combination of two or three altered variables may result in a similar performance improvement. Bloom thus challenged researchers and teachers to "find methods of group instruction as effective as one-to-one tutoring". Bloom's graduate students Joanne Anania and Arthur J. Burke conducted studies of the effect at different grade levels and in different schools, observing students with "great differences in cognitive achievement, attitudes, and academic self-concept".

Bloom classified alterable variables that may have, in combination, a 2 sigma effect as the following "objects of change process":

1. Learner
2. Instructional material
3. Home environment or peer group
4. Teacher

Bloom and his graduate students considered and tested various combinations of these variables, focusing only on those variables that individually had a 0.5 or higher effect size. These included:

Effect of selected alterable variables on student achievement
| Object of change process | Alterable variable | Effect size | Percentile equivalent |
|---|---|---|---|
| Teacher | Tutorial instruction | 2.00 | 98 |
| Teacher | Reinforcement | 1.2 | |
| Learner | Feedback-corrective (mastery learning) | 1.00 | 84 |
| Teacher | Cues and explanations | 1.00 | |
| Teacher, Learner | Student classroom participation | 1.00 | |
| Learner | Student time on task | 1.00 | |
| Learner | Improved reading/study skills | 1.00 | |
| Home environment / peer group | Cooperative learning | 0.80 | 79 |
| Teacher | Homework (graded) | 0.80 | |
| Teacher | Classroom morale | 0.60 | 73 |
| Learner | Initial cognitive prerequisites | 0.60 | |
| Home environment / peer group | Home environment intervention | 0.50 | 69 |
