= Blended learning =

Education practice

Blended learning or hybrid learning, also known as technology-mediated instruction, web-enhanced instruction, or mixed-mode instruction, is an approach to education that combines online educational materials and opportunities for interaction online with physical place-based classroom methods.

Blended learning requires the physical presence of both teacher and student, with some elements of student control over time, place, path, or pace. While students still attend brick-and-mortar schools with a teacher present, face-to-face classroom practices are combined with computer-mediated activities regarding content and delivery. It is also used in professional development and training settings. Since blended learning is highly context-dependent, a universal conception of it is difficult. Some reports have claimed that a lack of consensus on a hard definition of blended learning has led to difficulties in research on its effectiveness. A well-cited 2013 study broadly defined blended learning as a mixture of online and in-person delivery where the online portion effectively replaces some of the face-to-face contact time rather than supplementing it.

Additionally, a 2015 meta-analysis that historically looked back at a comprehensive review of evidence-based research studies around blended learning, found commonalities in defining that blended learning was "considered a combination of physical f2f [face to face] modes of instruction with online modes of learning, drawing on technology-mediated instruction, where all participants in the learning process are separated by distance some of the time." This report also found that all of these evidence-based studies concluded that student achievement was higher in blended learning experiences when compared to either fully online or fully face-to-face learning experiences. Whereas, "Hybrid learning is an educational model where some students attend class in-person, while others join the class virtually from home." Many Universities turned to remote learning and hybrid formats returning from the pandemic.

== Terminology ==
The terms "blended learning", "hybrid learning", "technology-mediated instruction", "web-enhanced instruction", and "mixed-mode instruction" are often used interchangeably in research literature.

Although the concepts behind blended learning first developed in the 1960s, the formal terminology to describe it did not take its current form until the late 1990s. One of the earliest uses of the term appears in a 1999 press release, in which the Interactive Learning Centers, an Atlanta-based education business, announced a change of name to EPIC Learning. The release mentions that "The Company currently operates 220 on-line courses, but will begin offering its Internet courseware using the company's Blended Learning methodology."

The term "blended learning" was initially vague, encompassing a wide variety of technologies and pedagogical methods in varying combinations (some making no use of technology whatsoever). In 2006, the term became more concrete with the publication of the first Handbook of Blended Learning by Bonk and Graham. Graham challenged the breadth and ambiguity of the term's definition, and defined "blended learning systems" as learning systems that "combine face-to-face instruction with computer mediated instruction".

In a report titled "Defining Blended Learning", researcher Norm Friesen suggests that, in its current form, blended learning "designates the range of possibilities presented by combining Internet and digital media with established classroom forms that require the physical co-presence of teacher and students".

== Delivery and usage ==
A research study published in 2023 concluded that: "The overarching message from this study is that the keys to a seamless delivery of hybrid classes and engaged and happy students and teachers are better support, effective training and reliable technology."

== History ==
While the first distance learning programs were introduced in the 1840s, technology-facilitated learning did not exist before the 1970s. Technology-based training emerged as an alternative to instructor-led training in the 1960s on mainframes and mini-computers. The major advantage that blended learning offers is scale, whereas one instructor can only teach so many people. One example is PLATO (Programmed Logic for Automatic Teaching Operations), a system developed by the University of Illinois and Control Data. PLATO in particular had a long history of innovations and offered coursework from elementary to the college level.

Satellite-based live video and CD-ROM based education delivery systems became popular as a way to solve issues with scale. Becoming a popular method in the late 1980s and early 1990s, CD-ROMs emerged as a dominant form of providing technology-based learning as bandwidth through 56k modems wasn't able to support very high quality sound and video.

Modern blended learning is delivered online, although CD-ROMs could feasibly still be used if a learning management system meets an institution's standards. Some examples of channels through which online blending learning can be delivered include webcasting (synchronous and asynchronous) and online video (live and recorded).

Solutions such as Khan Academy have been used in classrooms to serve as platforms for blended learning.

== Models ==
There is little consensus on the definition of blended learning. Some academic studies have suggested it is a redundant term. However, there are distinct blended learning models suggested by some researchers and educational think-tanks. These models include:

- Face-to-face driver – where the teacher drives the instruction and augments with digital tools.
- Rotation – students cycle through a schedule of independent online study and face-to-face classroom time.
- Flex – Most of the curriculum is delivered via a digital platform and teachers are available for face-to-face consultation and support.
- Labs – All of the curriculum is delivered via a digital platform but in a consistent physical location. Students usually take physical classes in this model as well.
- Self-blend – Students choose to augment their physical learning with online course work.
- Online driver – Students complete an entire course through an online platform with possible teacher check-ins. All curriculum and teaching is delivered via a digital platform and face-to-face meetings are scheduled or made available if necessary.

Even blended learning models can be blended together and many implementations use some, many, or even all of these as dimensions of larger blended learning strategy. These models, for the most part, are not mutually exclusive.

There are many components that can comprise a blended learning model, including "instructor-delivered content, e-learning, webinars, conference calls, live or online sessions with instructors, and other media and events, for example, Facebook, e-mail, chat rooms, blogs, podcasting, Twitter, YouTube, Skype and web boards".

== Advantages ==
Blended instruction is reportedly more effective than purely face-to-face or purely online classes. Blended learning methods can also result in high levels of student achievement more effective than face-to-face learning.

By using a combination of digital instruction and one-on-one face time, students can work on their own with new concepts which frees teachers up to circulate and support individual students who may need individualized attention. "Rather than playing to the lowest common denominator – as they would in a physical classroom – teachers can now streamline their instruction to help all students reach their full potential."

Proponents of blended learning argue that incorporating the "asynchronous Internet communication technology" into higher education courses serves to "facilitate a simultaneous independent and collaborative learning experience".

This incorporation is a major contributor to student satisfaction and success in such courses. The use of information and communication technologies have been found to improve student attitudes towards learning.

By incorporating information technology into class projects, communication between lecturers and part-time students has improved, and students were able to better evaluate their understanding of course material via the use of "computer-based qualitative and quantitative assessment modules".

Blended learning also has the potential to reduce educational expenses, although some dispute that blended learning is inherently less expensive than physical classroom learning.

Blended learning can lower costs by putting classrooms in the online space and it essentially replaces pricey textbooks with electronic devices that students often bring themselves to class. E-textbooks, which can be accessed digitally, may also help to drive down textbook budgets. Proponents of blended learning cite the opportunity for data collection and customization of instruction and assessment as two major benefits of this approach.

Blended learning often includes software that automatically collects student data and measures academic progress, providing teachers, students and parents detailed students data. Often, tests are automatically scored, providing instantaneous feedback. Student logins and work times are also measured to ensure accountability. Schools with blended learning programs may also choose to reallocate resources to boost student achievement outcomes.

Students with special talents or interests outside of the available curricula use educational technology to advance their skills or exceed grade restrictions.

A classroom environment that incorporates blended learning naturally requires learners to demonstrate more autonomy, self-regulation, and independence in order to succeed. If teachers offer a form of initial program orientation before introducing blended learning strategies, it can better prepare students to feel confident navigating the different components and developing a stronger sense of independence.

This virtual learning environment helps connect professors with students without physically being present, thus making this a 'virtual cafe'. Many schools use this online tool for online classes, classwork, question & answer forums, and other school related work. Blended learning yielded positive results from the online community. Such results were compared and showed similar results from that of Alcoholics Anonymous and Weight Watchers.

The advantages of blended learning are dependent on the quality of the programs being implemented. Some indicators of excellent blended learning programs are "facilitating student learning, communicating ideas effectively, demonstrating an interest in learning, organizing effectively, showing respect for students, and assessing progress fairly".

Blended learning is a practice that is gaining traction in large companies in various training fields.

== Disadvantages ==
Unless successfully planned and executed, blended learning could have disadvantages in technical aspects since it has a strong dependence on the technical resources or tools with which the blended learning experience is delivered. These tools need to be reliable, easy to use, and up to date, for them to have a meaningful impact on the learning experience.

IT literacy can serve as a significant barrier for students attempting to get access to the course materials, making the availability of high-quality technical support paramount. Other aspects of blended learning that can be challenging is group work because of difficulties with management in an online setting.

Reportedly the use of lecture recording technologies can result in students falling behind on the materials. In a study performed across four different universities, it was found that only half of the students watched the lecture videos on a regular basis, and nearly 40% of students watched several weeks' worth of videos in one sitting.

From an educator's perspective, most recently, it has been noted that providing effective feedback is more time-consuming (and therefore more expensive) when electronic media are used, in comparison to traditional (e.g. paper-based) assessments.

Another critical issue is access to network infrastructure. Although the digital divide is narrowing as the Internet becomes more pervasive, many students do not have pervasive and ubiquitous access to the Internet – even in their classrooms. Any attempt to incorporate blended learning strategies into an organization's pedagogical strategy needs to account for this.

Finally, in educational fields where interprofessional simulation and clinical based placement are key components (i.e. medicine, obstetrics & gynaecology), in-person teaching remains a cornerstone of clinical skills education, and teaching via online discourse alone is not sufficient to completely replace and provide comparable learning outcomes.

== 21st century literacies ==
The term "21st century literacies" was coined by The National Council of Teachers of English to describe the social nature of learning that is supported by the ability to collaborate using digital technologies in learning. These 'new literacies' are described as "skills students will need for the society in which they will work", including "strong communication and collaboration skills, expertise in technology, innovative and creative thinking skills, and an ability to solve problems". This set of skills and understandings will "prepare the workforce or citizenry for a changing, interconnected world".

These literacies are dynamic due to the ability to be linked to one another. According to NCTE, active, successful participants in this 21st century global society must be able to:

- develop proficiency and fluency with the tools of technology;
- build intentional cross-cultural connections and relationships with others so to pose and solve problems collaboratively and strengthen independent thought;
- design and share information for global communities to meet a variety of purposes;
- manage, analyze and synthesize multiple streams of simultaneous information;
- create, critique, analyze and evaluate multimedia texts;
- attend to the ethical responsibilities required by these complex environments.

== See also ==
- Digital badge – Indicator of accomplishment can be used to recognize any achievement, from passing a class to completing a training course
- Educational technology – Use of technology in education to enhance learning and teaching
- Flipped classroom – Instructional strategy and a type of blended learning
- Instructor-led training – any training that occurs in a training room, typically in an office, classroom, or conference room
- M-learning – Distance education using mobile device technology
- Media psychology – Area of psychology
- Mixed reality – Form of 3D computer interaction merging the real world with virtual objects
- Networked learning
- Synchronous learning – Type of learning event
- Virtual university – Higher education program on the Internet
