= Benjamin Bloom =

American psychologist

- Born: Benjamin Samuel Bloom; February 21, 1913; Lansford, Pennsylvania, US
- Died: September 13, 1999 (aged 86); Chicago, Illinois, US
- Known for: Bloom's taxonomy
- Awards: E. L. Thorndike Award (1973)

Academic background
- Education: Pennsylvania State College; University of Chicago
- Thesis: The relationship between educational objectives and examinations designed to measure achievement in general education courses at the college level (1943)

Academic work
- Discipline: Psychology
- Sub-discipline: Educational psychology
- Institutions: University of Chicago
- Notable ideas: Bloom's taxonomy; Bloom's 2 sigma problem; Mastery learning

Benjamin Samuel Bloom (February 21, 1913 – September 13, 1999) was an American educational psychologist and didactician who made contributions to the classification of educational objectives and to the theory of mastery learning. He has greatly influenced the practices and philosophies of educators around the world from the latter part of the twentieth century.

Perhaps his most significant contribution to the field of education was developing a comprehensive system of describing, assessing and classifying educational outcomes, now known as Bloom's taxonomy.

== Early life and education ==
Bloom was born in Lansford, Pennsylvania, to an immigrant Jewish family. His parents fled a climate of discrimination in Russia. He received a bachelor's degree from Pennsylvania State University in 1935 and a master's degree from Penn State, also in 1935. He received a doctorate from the University of Chicago in 1942 and joined its faculty in 1944.

From 1965–1966, he served as president of the American Educational Research Association.

== Works ==
In 1956, Bloom edited the first volume of The Taxonomy of Educational Objectives: The Classification of Educational Goals, which classified learning objectives according to a rubric that has come to be known as Bloom's taxonomy. It was one of the first attempts to systematically classify levels of cognitive functioning and gave structure to the otherwise amorphous mental processes of gifted students. Bloom's taxonomy remains a foundation of the academic profession according to the 1981 survey, "Significant Writings That Have Influenced the Curriculum: 1906–81" by Harold G. Shane and the National Society for the Study of Education. Bloom's 2 Sigma Problem is also attributed to him.

Benjamin Bloom conducted research on student achievement. Through conducting a variety of studies, Bloom and his colleagues observed factors within the school environment as well as outside of it that can affect how children learn. One example was the lack of variation in teaching. Bloom hypothesized that if teachers adapted their teaching methods to the individual needs of each student, more children would receive the opportunity to learn better. This led to the creation of Bloom's Mastery Learning procedure. This procedure required that teachers organize skills and concepts into instructional units approximately 1–2 weeks in length. At the end of the unit, the student would receive an assessment that would provide the student with constructive feedback on what the child learned from the unit. If a child lacked understanding of any of the major concepts of the unit, they would be assigned corrective assignments based on information they had trouble understanding. They would then take a second assessment focusing specifically on the skills and concepts they were instructed to practice. This ensures each student gains individualized instruction at a pace the child needs in order to learn at an optimum level. For students who showed mastery of the given unit, it is recommended that they receive enrichment activities to further their learning experiences. These activities are self-selected by the student and may come in the form of academic games, reports, special projects, etc.

Aside from his work on educational objectives and outcomes, Bloom also directed a research team that evaluated and elucidated the process of developing exceptional talents in individuals, shedding light upon the phenomena of vocational eminence and the concept of greatness.

In the article "The Role of Gifts and Markers in the Development of Talent" (1982), 70 individuals that are known as being among the best in their field are interviewed, in addition to their parents, teachers, and other significant persons in their life. The purpose of the interviews was to collect the various special characteristics believed to have been the reasons for their success. The individuals studied were mathematicians, Olympic swimmers, and concert pianists who were arguably some of the most successful in their field. The three main characteristics frequently shared in the interviews by the individuals, their parents, and teachers were willingness to work, competitiveness, and ability to learn new techniques. By the end of the Bloom's interviews, it was noted after all the data was collected that the interpretation of the parent's children as being talented led to the parents creating an environment that allowed for growth within the subject through hiring teachers/tutors, opportunities in the form of competitions and events, and overall encouragement from the parents and others involved in the individuals life. The belief that the individuals were talented, the attention given to a specific characteristic observed, as well as the possible inherent gift of the individual were considered to be markers. The markers were defined as the major reasons for the encouragement and motivation exhibited by the teachers and parents of the successful individuals. These factors in addition to the individual's interest and willingness to work in their respective field are arguably some of the reasons for their huge success.

== Sources ==
- Anderson, L. W. (2003). "Benjamin S. Bloom: His life, his works, and his legacy". In B. J. Zimmerman & D. H. Schunk (eds.), Educational psychology: A century of contributions (pp. 367–389). Lawrence Erlbaum Associates Publishers.

Professional and academic associations
Preceded by Lee Cronbach	President of the American; Educational Research Association; 1965–1966	Succeeded by Julian Stanley
