= Self-blended model of learning =

Version of learning where students direct what content is learned in-person or online

The self-blended model of learning (or self-blend model of learning) is a model of blended learning in which students take self-directed online courses in addition to their traditional face-to-face learning. It differs from blended learning models in which teachers assign online content and resources, since in self-blended learning it is the students who direct their own online learning. Specifically, this aspect of the model became relevant during the COVID-19 pandemic, where students required a flexible model of learning that did not rely on standardized classroom schedules. A study of tertiary schools in China found that the implementation of blended learning tools was one of the main factors that allowed the survival of the education system during the pandemic. The institutions used many open sourced applications to allow for students who did not have stable access to teaching materials while maintaining the educational quality. After being proven under pressure during the pandemic, many educators view this model as a sustainable method for post-pandemic learning. This highly flexible model allows for advanced students to take classes with increased specialization, and for students who have fallen behind in subjects to catch up on fundamentals.

This model of blended learning is commonly practiced among high school students, who follow this approach because it gives them the opportunity to supplement their studies in the traditional classroom setting. College students may also take online classes which are not offered by their university, allowing them to gain additional knowledge while still benefiting from a traditional university setting. Furthermore, students can participate in self-blended learning at odd hours or during weekdays, which is often essential to working adults.

The self-blended model of learning is generally approached by students opting to take online courses outside of the time they spend on traditional courses. It tackles the problem of the courses or subjects which are not provided by their school due to reasons such as lack of funding or time, or lack of student interest.

Students take online courses either in a brick-and-mortar campus or offsite. It is not necessary to have computers at home for students who use the self-blended model of learning, as they can access the internet at their own school computer labs or use local libraries to complete their work. They can also use nearby cyber lounges.

== History and global adoption ==
The self-blended learning model specifically gained popularity with the COVID-19 pandemic, when educational institutions started using online programs to make classes continue despite the lockdown. This led to the increasing popularity of this educational model and the idea of self-lead learning. The period served as a proving ground that the self-blended model could be implemented in educational systems if given the right resources and guidance. Its flexibility and resilience proved valuable when traditional schooling was disrupted. Independent studies across the world found that the self-blended model of learning was proven under pressure, with surveys in India finding that most students and teachers in public classrooms preferring self-blended learning to traditional classrooms. Most of the participants found the model useful for the flexibility and access to resources that it provided, resources that could not be accessed through the conventional education system. However, some teachers did note that some students found it difficult to stay motivated when the timeline of their education was in their hands.

Another factor of self-blended learning is the amount of external support and structure provided to the students. While the model does emphasize students learning at their own pace given some resources, an educational system does require some outside input in order to adequately equip its students to face an ever-changing global landscape. Researchers in the United Arab Emirates found that the success of self-blended learning leans heavily on institutional support, access to technology, and proper training for educators. Additionally, local cultures and practices as they relate to education can impact the viability of this learning model in a specific community. Certain cultures favor an in-person learning as well as a personal connection with one's teachers rather than digital learning.

== Use ==
The self-blend learning model is frequently adopted by high school students, as it necessitates students to oversee their learning progress and take initiative, tasks younger students may find challenging to manage. Contrary to the rotational model of learning commonly employed in elementary schools, high school students often supplement their in-person courses with online math, English, and social studies courses. For instance, students may utilize online resources for advanced placement courses or for remedial learning in subjects where they seek additional support. Additionally, this model of learning has continued to expand past grade school and has now been implemented in university as well. College students, who are more comfortable using technology and pacing their own learning have been found to use the self-blended model of learning more efficiently. The sense of self-efficacy that comes from a college student fits perfectly in a self-blended environment as this method of learning requires a level of maturity and personal agency in managing their own education. Furthermore, the control that self-blended learning allows students over their own education builds their sense of autonomy, creating a positive feedback loop of reinforced learning.

Additionally, the implication of self-blended extends past the educational system and its branches. Other applications of the model include workforce training tailored for the pace of the individual. Full-time employees specifically, who require a higher level of flexibility in learning new concepts than full-time students benefit from this model. Self-blended learning helps them to achieve a level of independence in their ongoing learning, a trait that is encouraged by many companies.

== Advantages ==
There are a number of advantages to the self-blend model of learning:

1. It is very helpful for dropout students to recover, earn college/AP credit or to recover credits.
2. It not only enhances the classroom learning but it also provides access to online courses which are otherwise not offered in the school due to various reasons, such as lack of funds, time and resources.
3. In addition to the access to the online courses, it also enhances the digital literacy of the students, useful for students entering a 21st century workforce.
4. Taking online courses is more affordable for the students.
5. It provides opportunities to take up specialized courses, such as college preparatory skill and life skills courses.
6. It can be used for professional development as well as for instructional purposes.

== Disadvantages ==
The main disadvantage of the self-blend model is that the students will not receive face to face instruction for that particular course. It also involves a lack of formal structure for the undisciplined and unmotivated students. While the independent structure and the flexibility that comes with self-blended learning is certainly an advantage, it might not always be perfect for everyone. One of the main challenges that come with this type of learning would be maintaining a strong level of self-motivation and academic structure that is usually provided with a traditional method of learning. Students who struggle to sustain these aspects by themselves might benefit from a more conventional learning model. These students might find themselves falling behind without the needed support and guidance offered in traditional learning models.

Another aspect to consider is the social bonding that school provides to adolescents. Self-blended learning can decrease a student's social opportunities, especially at periods in their lives when interaction with peers is critical in development. From an educational standpoint, collaborative learning and peer interaction at a young age is crucial for building necessary skills for later in life. Self-blended learning does not offer these same social opportunities, and without this structure some students might feel isolated. On the other hand, self-blended learning might free up time for students to make more meaningful relationships. Instead of being forced to sit in a classroom for most of the day, students are free to work from whatever location they feel most productive in and work with whoever they would prefer.

== See also ==
- 21st century skills
- Distance learning
- Pedagogy
- Personalized learning
- Rotation model of learning
