= ILIAS =

Web-based learning management system

- Developer: ILIAS open source e-Learning e. V.
- Stable release: 11.6 / 17 November 2026; 1 day ago
- Written in: PHP
- Operating system: Cross-platform
- Type: Learning management system
- License: GPL
- Website: www.ilias.de
- Repository: github.com/ILIAS-eLearning/ILIAS

ILIAS (Integriertes Lern-, Informations- und Arbeitskooperations-System [German for "Integrated Learning, Information and Work Cooperation System"]) is an open-source web-based learning management system (LMS). It supports learning content management (including SCORM 2004 compliance) and tools for collaboration, communication, evaluation and assessment. The software is published under the GNU General Public License and can be run on any server that supports PHP and MySQL.

== History ==
ILIAS is one of the first Learning Management Systems to have been used in universities. A prototype had been developed since the end of 1997 under the VIRTUS project at the Faculty of Management, Economics, and Social Sciences of the University of Cologne, initiated and organized by Wolfgang Leidhold. On November 2, 1998, version 1 of the LMS ILIAS was published and offered for learning at the Cologne faculty of business administration, economics, and social sciences. Initially used locally, its popularity prompted the team to publish ILIAS as open-source software under the GPL in 2000. Between 2002 and 2004, a new ILIAS version was developed from scratch and called “ILIAS 3”. In 2004, it became the first open-source LMS to reach full SCORM (Sharable Content Object Reference Model) 1.2 compliance. SCORM 2004 compliance has been reached with version 3.9 as of November 2007.

== Features ==
ILIAS offers a lot of features to design and run online-courses, create learning content, offer assessments and exercises, run surveys and support communication and cooperation among users.

=== Personal Desktop ===
ILIAS features two core components: the repository and the personal desktop. The Repository stores and organizes all content, courses, and materials categorized and described with metadata. In contrast, the Personal Desktop serves as each user's customized workplace, providing access to selected Repository items, such as current courses or forum, alongside essential tools like email, tagging, calendar, e-portfolio, and personal blogs.

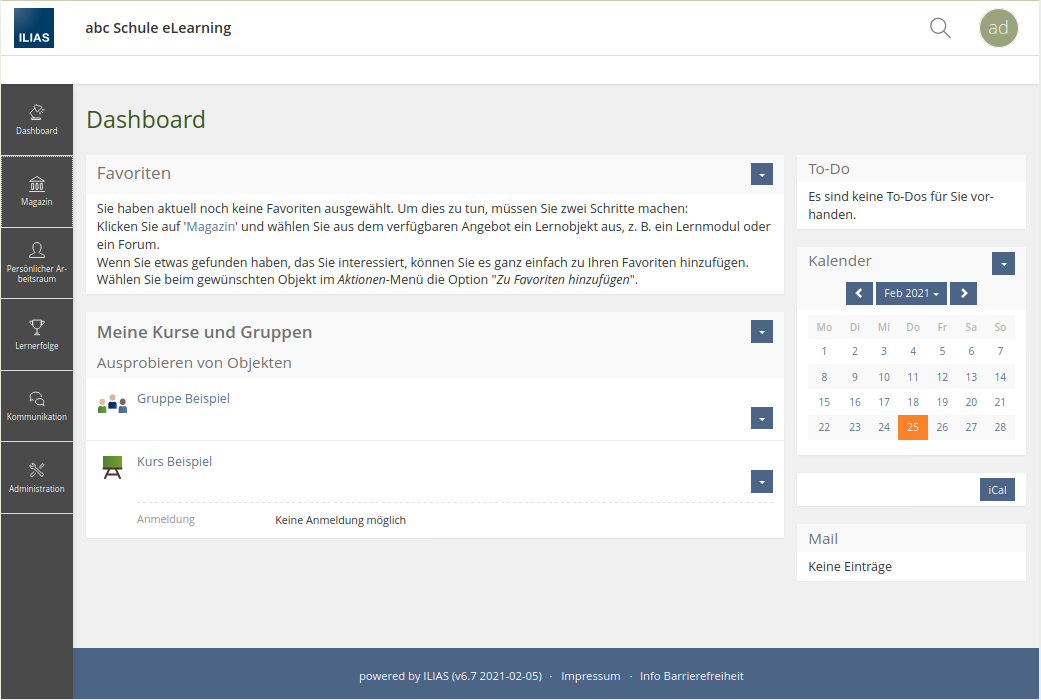
Dashboard of ILIAS 6

- Listing of selected courses, groups and learning resources
- Personal profile and settings like password and system language
- Bookmark Management
- Personal Notes
- External Web Feeds
- Internal News
- Personal Workspace
- Blogs
- e-Portfolio
- Calendar
- Internal Mail
- Personal Learning Progress

=== Learning Content Management ===
ILIAS's repository is a centralized hub for storing and managing diverse content, including learning materials, forums, chat rooms, tests, surveys, virtual classrooms and external tools. This flexible structure enables content sharing without requiring course creation, allowing ILIAS to function as a knowledge base or website. Access to all repository items is granted by the role-based access control (RBAC) of ILIAS. The repository is organized into a hierarchical tree structured with a root node and multiple levels. Each repository item is assigned to one node in the RBAC tree.

ILIAS offers four kinds of container for delivering content:

- Categories
- Courses incl. member administration
- Groups incl. member administration
- Folders (within courses and groups)

Container objects can be extended by using the page editor for adding text, images or videos to the page.

All content objects are handled as references. They can be moved, copied or linked into other branches of the repository tree. A file that has already been uploaded can be linked multiple times in different courses and categories without being uploaded a second time.

=== Course Management ===
- Enrollment Settings
- Learning Resource Management
- Time triggered/Conditional Access
- Learning Progress Tracking for Members
- Member Gallery and (Google) Map
- Course News and Announcements

=== Cooperation ===
- Group Management
- Awareness Feature (who is online?)
- vCard Export
- File Sharing
- Wiki

=== Communication ===
- Internal Messaging
- Chat
- Forum
- Podcasting
- Etherpad / Edupad plugin

=== Test/Assessment ===
- Question Types: Multiple choice, fill-in-the-blanks, numerical, matching, ordering, hot spot, essay
- Question Pools for re-using questions in different tests
- Randomization of questions and choices
- IMS-QTI Import and Export
- Online exams
- Learning progress control

=== Evaluation ===
- Personalised and anonymous surveys
- Question types: Multiple choice, matrix, open answer
- Pools for question administration and re-use
- Online report analysis
- CSV and excel export of survey results

=== Learning Content / Authoring ===
- XML-based learning document format, exports to HTML, XML and SCORM
- SCORM 1.2 (Certified for SCORM-Conformance Level LMS-RTE3)
- SCORM 2004 (Certified as LMS for SCORM 2004 3rd Edition)
- AICC
- OpenOffice.org and LibreOffice Import Tool (eLAIX)
- LaTeX-Support
- HTML Site Import
- Wiki
- File Management (all formats)

=== Administration ===
- Role administration (global roles, local roles, role templates)
- User administration
- Authentication CAS, LDAP, SOAP, RADIUS and Shibboleth
- Individual layout templates / skins
- Support for multiple clients
- PayPal payment
- Didactic templates
- Statistics and learning progress administration
- SOAP Interface
