= History of virtual learning environments in the 1990s =

In the history of virtual learning environments, the 1990s was a time of growth, primarily due to the advent of the affordable computer and of the Internet.

== 1980s ==
=== 1985 ===
The Free Educational Mail (FrEdMail) network was created by San Diego educators, Al Rogers and Yvonne Marie Andres, in 1985. More than 150 schools and school districts were using the network for free international email access and curriculum services.

== 1990s ==
=== 1990 ===
- Formal Systems Inc. of Princeton, NJ, USA introduces a DOS-based Assessment Management System. An internet version was introduced in 1997. (In 2000, Formal Systems changed its name to Pedagogue Solutions.
- The Athena Project at MIT, which started in 1983, has evolved into a system of "shared services" that look remarkably like many current VLEs or learning management systems. The network hosted software from multiple vendors, and made it all work together. Here is a list of the features of the system as of 1990: printing, electronic mail, electronic messaging (Zephyr), bulletin board conferencing (Discuss), on-line consulting (OLC), on-line teaching assistant (OLTA), on-line help (OLH), assignment exchange (Turn in/pick up), access to system libraries, authentication for system security (Kerberos), naming-for linking system components together (Hcsiod), and a service management system (Moira).
- Pavel Curtis created LambdaMOO, an early Multi-User Dungeon (MUD), at Xerox PARC.
- HyperCourseware created by Kent Norman at the University of Maryland, College Park was originally written for use in the AT&T Teaching Theater, a prototype electronic classroom. The original version was written in WinPlus, a Hypercard like program, and ran on a local area network with one server and numerous client workstations. It included an online syllabus, online lecture notes and readings, synchronous chat rooms, asynchronous discussion boards, online student profiles with pictures, online assignments and exams, online grading, and a dynamic seating chart. A Web-based version was introduced in January 1996, which continued to function up until the end of 2017.
- The US Navy's Naval Technical Training System was designed as a curriculum development system. It included course management tools for the storage, retrieval and dissemination of information.
- An article in Electronic Learning by Therese Mageau describes Integrated Learning Systems (ILS) as "networked computers running broad-based curriculum software with a management system that tracks student progress."
- A report by George Mann and Joe Kitchens reviews the Curriculum Management System (CMS), a system that generated individualized learning plans every two weeks for each student.
- FirstClass is launched by SoftArc, initially for the Macintosh platform.

=== 1991 ===
- Thousands of FrEdMail users gained access to the NSFNET via newly established gateways at two NSFNET mid-level network locations: Merit/MichNet in Ann Arbor, MI, and CERFnet (California Education and Research Federation Network) in San Diego, CA. FrEdMail subscribers began to exchange project-based learning electronic mail with the entire Internet community. The FrEdMail-NSFNET Gateway Software was available free of cost to any mid-level network, college, or university which had an interest in collaborating with local K-12 school districts to bring electronic networking to teachers and students. Through FrEdMail, educators were able share classroom experiences, distribute curriculum ideas and teaching materials, as well as obtain information about workshops, job opportunities, and legislation affecting education. At its peak, FrEdMail was used by 12,000 schools and 350 nodes worldwide. When the World Wide Web became available to the public in 1993, the FrEdMail Foundation became the Global SchoolNet Foundation and launched its first website, GlobalSchoolhouse.org. The following year the National Science Foundation also awarded Global SchoolNet a grant to introduce a desktop video-conferencing program called CU-SeeMe. CU-SeeMe was used for many educational video-conferences and in 1995 by World News Now for the first television broadcast live on the Internet, which featured an interview by World News Now anchor Kevin Newman and Yvonne Andrés.
- iEARN (International Education and Resource Network) launched among schools in nine countries, using the IGC/APC system of "conferences/newsgroups" to better enable students to conduct theme-based online projects.
- The history page of the TEDS company states that they developed the first Learning Management System.
- Jakob Ziv-El of Interactive Communication Systems, Inc. files for a patent for an Interactive Group Communication System (# 5,263,869) (similar to the prior art of the IBM 1500 system). A 1990 foreign patent and a 1972 patent by Jakob Zawels (# 3,641,685) are referenced. The patent is granted in 1993. The patent is referenced in a 2000 patent filing (# 6,988,138) by representatives of BlackBoard, Inc.
- Murray Turoff, the guru of EIES, publishes "Computer-Mediated Communication Requirements for Group Support" (PDF). Journal of Organizational Computing (1): 85–113. 1991. Archived from the original on 29 July 2012. This distills lessons from a research programme run by him over the preceding 16 years, from 1974.
- A collaboration of faith based groups (Ecunet) start using a product called BizLink (which later became Convene) in teaching their missionaries and staff around the world using the internet.
- Gloria Gery publishes Electronic performance support systems: how and why to remake the workplace through the strategic application of technology, which influences thinking about technology and learning in the workplace.

=== 1992 ===
- CAPA (Computer Assisted Personalized Approach) system was developed at Michigan State University. It was first used in a small (92 student) physics class in the Fall of 1992. Students accessed randomized (personalized) homework problems through telnet.
- Convene International is founded by Jeffery Stein and Reda Athanasios to provide collaboration tools via the Internet.
- UNI-C, the Danish State Centre for Computing in Education (which became a Blackboard user in the 2000s) supports a wide range of online distance courses using PortaCOM, a conferencing platform, for example in the TUDIC project, funded under the EU's COMET Programme. Extensive theoretical work undertaken by, amongst others, Elsebeth Korsgaard Sorensen, whose web site has a detailed bibliography.
- Collaborative Learning Through Computer Conferencing, also known as the Najaden Papers, edited by Anthony Kaye in the NATO ASI Series, and published by Springer-Verlag (ISBN 3-540-55755-5). Provides several case studies of online learning in action, and an overview by Jacob Palme providing a comprehensive inventory of the functionalities available in computer conferencing systems, including SuperKOM. This last paper describes in detail the underlying functions of what would now be called a virtual learning environment, including, for example, roles, voting, expiration times, exams, moderation, deferred operations.
- Open University (UK) installs FirstClass on a Mac server (reputed to be server license number 3) after an extensive evaluation of tools suitable to deliver online learning across Europe for the just-started JANUS project funded by the European Commission under the DELTA programme. (FirstClass was then a product of SoftArc in Ontario, Canada.).
- The New York University School of Continuing Education (SCE) introduces its Virtual College and develops a digital network to deliver courses to students. SCE uses Lotus Notes at least through 1997 for computer conferencing and to provide online computer laboratory access to student home PCs.
- GeoMetrix Data Systems founded. They produce the learning management system called TrainingPartner.
- [LearnFrame] of Draper, Utah founded. They initially produced online courseware and an authoring tool, and in 1995 developed Pinnacle Learning Manager, that accepted and managed courses from a wide variety of vendors.
- Following several years of preparatory studies, the European Commission DELTA programme starts. (DELTA stands for Developing European Learning through Technological Advances.) Over 30 projects are funded, each lasting for around three years, many relevant to VLEs, perhaps the most relevant ones being MTS, JANUS and EAST. The DELTA programme built on preparatory studies going on since 1985 into portable educational tools environments (proto-VLEs), networked multimedia and hypermedia, satellite networks, and a Learning Systems Reference Model (in some ways a precursor of IMS). There seems to be almost no Web information now on the preparatory studies, except for an interview with Luis Rosello in DEOSNews.
- Authorware Inc. merges with MacroMind/ParaComp to create Macromedia. MacroMind specialized in animation software (Director) and ParaComp specialized in 3D imagery (Swivel 3D). Macromedia goes public only months after the merger and remains the leading purveyor of multimedia tools.
- Terry Hedegaard of UOP online picks Convene International's Internet collaboration tools to run a pilot for teaching UOP students online exclusively.
- The MUD Institute (TMI/TMI-2) provides the TMI Mudlib and online environment for learning MUD programming, including e-mail, bulletin boards, shared file spaces, real time chat, and instant messaging.
- Terry Anderson coordinates a net-based "virtual conference" in conjunction with the 16th World Congress of the International Council for Distance Education. This project used email lists and Usenet groups distributed on the early Internet, Usenet, BitNet, and NetNorth.
- Humber College's Digital Electronics program used a learning management system to support a set of online courses. The program featured individualized instruction and continuous intake.
- University of Wales, Aberystwyth awarded internal funding to further develop its 'integrated project support environment for teaching software engineering'.

=== 1993 ===
- Jakob Ziv-El of Discourse Technologies, Inc. files for a patent for a Remote Teaching System (# 5,437,555) (similar to the prior art of the PLATO system), referencing his 1991 patent. The patent is granted in 1995. The patent is referenced in a 2000 patent filing (# 6,988,138) by representatives of BlackBoard, Inc.
- XT001 Renewable energy, a "landmark" experimental course developing techniques for collaborative and resource-based online learning at a distance, was the first "real" course to use FirstClass as its core online tool at the Open University. There are many references (mostly forgotten now) but particularly useful is.
- Convene International contracted to work with University of Phoenix to develop the first large-scale commercial product for use in Virtual Classrooms. Convene's unique characteristic enabled students to capture data and then work offline (at a time when people were often charged by the hour or minute for online time). University of Phoenix' Thomas Bishop brands the product "ALEX" for Apollo Learning Exchange."
- As Convene finishes the development of ALEX for University of Phoenix the pilot enrollment grows to 600 students within the first few months of implementation.
- Brandon Hall puts out the first issue of his Multimedia and Internet Training Newsletter, one of the first regular publications in the field.
- Jisc (the Joint Information Systems Committee of the UK Higher Education Funding and Research Councils) is established on 1 April 1993, as a successor body to the Information Systems Committee.
- Also in 1993, ALT - the Association for Learning Technology - was founded in the UK, initially with the assistance of a donation by BT.
- Michael Hammer and James A. Champy publish "Reengineering the Corporation: a Manifesto for Business Revolution" (New York: HarperCollins, 1993). As usual with business theories it took some time for Reengineering, or Business Process Reengineering in full (BPR in short), to percolate to higher education; but in fact Reengineering spread (to a few) much faster than some other approaches (such as Activity Based Costing or Benchmarking) - already in the 1995-98 period a number of university e-learning experts in UK, Netherlands and Malaysia were using the language, in many cases to the dismay of their colleagues. It is a moot point whether BPR accelerated the development of e-learning or inhibited it - certainly at CEO level in some universities the ideas were for a while seductive. BPR has a sharp edge - the gentler but vaguer approach of Change Management seems to be more enduring
- Scott Gray, a mathematics graduate student at Ohio State, develops The Web Workshop, a system that allows users to create Web pages online while learning. The pedagogical technique called Useractive Learning was developed to emulate the teaching techniques used in the Calculus & Mathematica courses taught at Ohio State.
- Bill Davis, Jerry Uhl, Bruce Carpenter, and Lee Wayand launch MathEverywhere, Inc. to market and sell the coursework used in Calculus & Mathematica courses.

=== 1994 ===
- In 1994, NKI Distance Education in Norway starts its second generation, online, distance education courses. The courses were provided on the Internet through EKKO, NKI's self-developed Learning Management System (LMS). The experiences are described in the article NKI Fjernundervisning: Two Decades of Online Sustainability in Morten Flate Paulsen's book Online Education and Learning Management Systems.
- CALCampus launches online-based school through which administration, real-time classroom instruction, and materials are provided.
- The Tarrson Family Endowed Chair in Periodontics at UCLA is established with a testamentary gift to design, develop and launch the UCLA Periodontics Information Center for sharing periodontal practices and concepts with the worldwide dental community via CD-ROM and the Internet.
- Lotus Development Corporation acquires the Human Interest Group. The system evolves into the Lotus Learning Management System and Lotus Virtual Classroom now owned by IBM. Links to articles that describes how IBM has previously implemented the "inventions" described in the Blackboard patent.
- SUNY Learning Network begins in 1994. Traditional faculty were hired to create online courses for asynchronous delivery into the home via computer. Each faculty member worked with an instructional design partner to implement the course. From the fall of 1995 through spring of 1997, forty courses were developed and delivered. SLN now supports over 3,000 faculty, 100,000 enrollments on 40 of the State University of New York's campuses.
- WEST 1.0 is released by WBT Systems. It eventually is renamed TopClass.
- Bob Jensen and Petrea Sandlin publish Electronic Teaching and Learning: Trends in Adapting to Hypertext, Hypermedia, and Networks in Higher Education - republished 1997. Text includes identification of ten leading LMS systems in 1994 (discussed in detail in chapter 3 of their book):
  - Quest from Allen Communication
  - Tourguide from American Training International (Tourguide is no longer listed as a product at Infotec.)
  - Multimedia ToolBook from Asymetrix Corporation, bought by Click2Learn, bought by SumTotal Systems
  - Lesson Builder from the Center for Education Technology in Accounting (this product never was completed)
  - Tencore from Computer Teaching Corporation
  - Course Builder from Discovery Systems International, Inc.
  - Training Icon Environment (TIE) from Global Information Systems Technology, Inc.
  - tbtAuthor from HyperGraphics Corporation (HyperGraphics no longer lists tbtAuthor in its product line)
  - Authorware from Macromedia Corporation
  - Personal Education Authoring Kit (PEAK) from Major Educational Resources Corp. PEAK is for Mac users only and has been discontinued. However, while they last you can get free copies at 800-989-5353.
- Banking on the tremendous commercial success and rapid growth for the UOP program, Reda Athanasios of Convene International starts making the online virtual classroom suite, built in collaboration with UOP, available for all other schools aiming at success for their distance education programs.
- The JANUS project led by the Open University releases in September 1994 Deliverable 45 describing the interim evaluations of the first three online courses delivered across Europe in conjunction with the JANUS project, including AD280 "What is Europe", DM863 "Lisp Programming" and D309 "Cognitive Psychology" Virtual Summer School. Later in the year the Open University releases a longer final report purely on the Virtual Summer School.
- September 1994: The JANUS User Association holds its first AGM and conference at the Dutch Open University. It is one of the first Europe-wide associations focussed on e-learning. It later changed its name to LearnTel and continued until 1999. An online archive of the newsletter is still available via the support of pjb Associates.
- Athabasca University (Canada) implements first on-line Executive MBA program using Lotus Notes.
- TeleEducation NB introduces a DOS-based working LMS in 1993. In 1994 a more powerful system was proposed for the WWW. A description of the concept was published in 1995 with some of the principal features of an LMS.
- Taking advantage of Convene International's online virtual classroom and hoping for similar success to that of UOP online, several schools start working with Convene in wiring their Distance Education programs and offering it online via the Internet.
- Mark Lavenant and John Kruper present "The Phoenix Project at the University of Chicago: Developing a Secure, Distributed Hypermedia Authoring Environment Built on the World Wide Web" at the First International World-Wide Web Conference in Geneva, Switzerland. "The Phoenix Project" later became the Web-based learning environment within the Division of the Biological Sciences at the University of Chicago.
- Swanton High School in Ohio used learning management systems to track student progress, as well as testing results, satellite courses, videodiscs, Hypercard, QuickTime video, and Internet connections.
- Intralearn comes out with a Learning Management System for the Mid Market. This system has the facility to conduct courses to students from different locations using internet, interact with them, send them mails and conduct examinations.
- Tufts University released (1994) the Health Sciences Database which subsequently (2003) became known as TUSK, Tufts university sciences knowledgebase. In 1997 using MYSQL created version 3 - hsdb3. There has been a steady development of features through versions hsdb4, hsdb45, TUSK 1.0 and now TUSK 2.0. From its inception its basis was integration of clinical information with its ubiquitous availability across space and time. Students and authors had specific permissions within the system. TUSK is a combination learning management system, content/knowledge management system and course management system. The system is used at the three health sciences schools at Tufts and now a 7 partner schools in the U.S., Africa and India.
- July 1994: First international gathering of educators using online technologies to conduct classroom project-based learning was held by iEARN (International Education and Resource Network) in Puerto Madryn, Argentina. 120 educators from 20 countries gathered to share experiences. Out of this conference came the first international iEARN constitution and plans to expand school networking globally.

=== 1995 ===
- Jerrold Maddox, at Penn State University, taught a course, Commentary on Art, on the web starting in January 1995. It was the first course taught at a distance using the web.
- By January 1995 there are dozens of MUDs and MOOs, including Diversity University, in use for educational purposes.
- Elliott Masie and Rebekah Wolman publish the first edition of The Computer Training Handbook (Minneapolis: Lakewood Books).
- Pardner Wynn introduces a free web-based interactive course at testprep.com for SAT test preparation, possibly the first interactive learning course on the internet. Over 1 millions hits are registered within three months, encouraging the development of the first commercial web-based e-learning course authoring, publishing, and management system, IBTauthor (announced January 1996 in Brandon Hall's Multimedia Training Newsletter). This product became the basis for VC-backed Docent, Inc. (funded in 1997, IPO in 2000), now named SumTotal Systems.
- European Commission establishes the European Multimedia Task Force, to analyse the status of educational media in Europe. The field covered by the Task Force includes all educational and cultural products and services that can be accessed by TVs and computers, whether via telematics networks or not, and used in the home, industry or educational contexts.
- Lotus Notes used for course materials, syllabi, handouts, homework collection, teams, and multi-instructor, multi-team teaching in the MBA program. Results reported at several academic conferences (ICIS-17, AIS-2) in 1996.
- Mallard web-based course management system developed at the University of Illinois. Mallard allows for multiple roles. For example, a graduate student can be an instructor in one course and a student in another.
- WOLF (Wolverhampton Online Learning Framework) is developed at the University of Wolverhampton's Broadnet project under the guidance of Stephen Molyneux to deliver training materials to local SMEs (Small to Medium Enterprises). In 1999, WOLF is both adopted as the university's VLE, and sold for commercial distribution to Granada Learning, who rebrand the product in partnership with the university and market it to the UK FE and HE sectors under the name Learnwise. WOLF is still in use at the university today, and undergoing continual development to meet the ever-changing needs of education.
- Nicenet ICA launched to the public.
- Murray Goldberg begins development of WebCT at the University of British Columbia in Vancouver, Canada, with a $45,000-grant from UBC's Teaching and Learning Enhancement Fund. WebCT would go on to become the world's most widely used VLE used by millions of students in 80 countries.
- FirstClass is named the Best General Purpose Tool/School Program by Technology & Learning magazine.
- Professors Michael Gage and Arnold Pizer develop the WeBWorK Online Homework Delivery System at the University of Rochester.
- Virtual Science and Mathematics Fair used static HTML pages created by children and a threaded discussion for comment posts left by judges and visitors. PhD research reported by Kevin C. Facemyer, 1996.
- The Future of Networking Technologies for Learning Workshop held, sponsored by US Department of Education. "In an attempt to answer the question, "What is the future of networking technologies for learning," the U.S. Department of Education's Office of Educational Technology commissioned a series of white papers on various aspects of educational networking and hosted a workshop to discuss the issues. The white papers and the workshop report are here."
- The European Commission release in May 1995 a 104-page report describing the 30 projects commissioned under the DELTA programme of Framework 3. Several of these are concerned with online learning using what many might today call a "virtual learning environment". (The phrase is not used as such but the phrases "learning environment", "interactive learning environment" and "collaborative learning environment" are used quite frequently.)
- About the same time the JANUS project releases the JANUS Final Report describing the project over its three-year lifetime and all the online courses it has supported during 1993-1994 across Europe.
- The report Telematics for Distance Education in North America is released in public form in November 1995 after wide dissemination within European research circles. It describes the situation as it pertains to e-learning at 20 organisations including universities and most major vendors, based on a 3-week study trip in summer 1995 by Bacsich and Mason.
- A short article in the LIGIS newsletter for November 1995 on FirstClass confirms that at the time of its writing FirstClass did not have a Web interface. (It also notes that its then rival CAUCUS did have a Web interface and that WEST, later TopClass from WBTSystems, had been recently developed.)
- Northern Virginia Community College (NVCC)'s Extended Learning Institute develops and delivers four math, science, and engineering courses using Lotus Notes for computer conferencing/groupware functionality.
- Edward Barrett at MIT received a grant to create a prototype "Electronic Multimedia Online Textbook in Engineering" (EMOTE) for use in classes taught through the new Writing Initiative.
- WebTeach, a web-based asynchronous communication system using chronological threads in the "Confer style" originally developed in the mid 70s by Robert Parnes, was first used in 1995 in the Professional Development Centre at UNSW. It was written in Apple's Hypercard as a CGI script running behind WebStar by Dr. Chris Hughes and Dr. Lindsay Hewson at UNSW. The 1996 versions supported a Notice Board, a Seminar Room and a Coffee Shop for each class group, and added email notifications, a Quiz function, and a range of pre-programmed communication modes that emulated small group teaching strategies including brainstorming, questioning, case studies and commitment exercises. The modes were characterised by changes in layout, font colours, and the options available to teachers and students. The software was refined in subsequent years, with additional modes, including a formal debate mode, being added. In 2002 it was completely rewritten in Cold Fusion and refined to include many more features, including private groups, voting modes and fully functional web-based administration pages. WebTeach supports an approach to teaching and learning on the web that is more akin to an asynchronous virtual classroom than it is to an instructionally designed and packaged educational experience. Communication forms the basis of the teaching (as opposed to content provision) and the teacher in a group can switch teaching strategies (modes) easily, in order to respond to student contributions.
- Many online schools appear on the educational scenes after working with Convene International. Some of them emerge as leaders of Internet Education like, Baker College and Pacific Oaks College and UCLA extension to name a few.
- The Stanford Center for Professional Development (SCPD, formerly SITN) launches Stanford Online, which "was the first university internet delivery system incorporating text and graphics with video and audio, using technology developed at Stanford."
- "Constructing Educational Courseware using NCSA Mosaic and the World Wide Web" is presented by J.K. Campbell, S. Hurley, S.B. Jones, and N.M. Stephens at the 3rd International World-Wide Web Conference in Darmstadt, Germany.
- Lee A. Newberg, Richard Rouse III, and John Kruper publish "Integrating the World-Wide Web and Multi-User Domains to Support Advanced Network-Based Learning Environments" in the Proceedings of the World Conference on Educational Multimedia and Hypermedia (1995), Association for the Advancement of Computing in Education, Graz, Austria.
- From May to July 1995 Georg Fuellen, Robert Giegerich and others give the "BioComputing Course" using the Electronic Conferencing system BioMOO, later winning the "Multimedia Transfer 1997" presented during the exhibition Learntec 1997.
- Work began at University of Wales, Aberystwyth in developing its integrated Remote Advisory System, a system designed to provide students with remotely sited tutors, sharing workspaces, audio and video. Supported by Internal Outlook Enterprise Funding.
- Sue Polyson, Robert Godwin-Jones, and Steve Saltzberg of Virginia Commonwealth University (VCU), at a Fall 1995 meeting of the "Partnership for Distributed Learning" (a consortium of US schools organized by University of North Carolina, Chapel Hill) proposed the concept for developing a web-based course management system named "Web Course in a Box". They described the basic system features and proposed that interested schools work together to develop a working prototype of this system. The VCU group began work on the prototype with input from the consortium. Work continued through the Winter, 1995 and Spring 1996. A first beta of Web Course in a Box was presented to the group in Spring, 1996. The idea for Web Course in a Box grew out of work that Polyson had begun in 1994–1995 at VCU to develop a web-based interface for delivery of course materials to support VCU's Executive Masters in Health Administration, one of the first distance-delivered master's degree programs in the country. During this time, Godwin-Jones, also at VCU, had been working to develop web-based content for foreign language instruction. This work was described in two articles published by Syllabus Press, in the September 1995 issue of Syllabus (Volume 9, No.1) titled "Distributed Learning on the World Wide Web" and "Technology Across the Curriculum - Case Studies", both authored by Saltzberg and Polyson.
- QuestionMark brings out first web based assessment management system QM Web, following on from DOS and Windows assessment systems.
- Online Learning Circles move from the AT&T Learning Network to their current home on the International Education and Resources Network (iearn)

=== 1996 ===
- The Project for OnLine Instructional Support is designed and developed at the University of Arizona. This tool provides innovative dialog-based lessons to students. To support use of these lessons a method for providing online course context, course organization and course communications tools is created.
- In 1996, NKI Distance Education in Norway starts its third generation online distance education courses. The courses were web-based and provided through EKKO (renamed to SESAM), NKI's self-developed Learning Management System (LMS). The experiences are described in the article NKI Fjernundervisning: Two Decades of Online Sustainability in Morten Flate Paulsen's book Online Education and Learning Management Systems.
- In 1996, after hearing about the Virtual Office Hours Project developed by Prof. Craig Merlic and Matthew Walker in UCLA's Department of Biochemistry, UCLA Social Sciences reviewed it with some of the faculty and decided to try writing a custom version. The deciding factor was finding Jeff Carnahan's Upload.pl Perl CGI Script (available at Misc CGI Scripts - click on FileUploader 6.0 for free, but registration required) that did File Uploads via a web browser. With that, Matt Wright's WWWBoard, a Calendar script, later discarded, and a script written by Social Sciences Computing to edit files on the fly, there were enough tools to make something useful. Originally the plan was to have instructors fill out a web form to request a site. But due to problems getting the email to work, sites were created instantly instead. That turned out to be easier. A password was added and emailed to all the Social Sciences faculty. ClassWeb was first offered to UCLA Social Sciences Faculty in the Spring Quarter of 1997. Eight instructors set up ClassWeb sites (see Spring 1997 sites).
- Early 1996, Dan Cane, a sophomore student at Cornell University begins working Cindy van Es, a senior lecturer in Agricultural, Resource and Managerial Economics (ARME) as part of an independent study project to build course web pages. In turn he develops automated scripts to provide basic interactive functionality for announcements and the beginnings of a suite of tools called The Teachers Toolbox. These ideas later become the foundation for CourseInfo.
- The UCLA Periodontics Information Center was established in 1996 within the UCLA School of Dentistry with generous gifts from the Tarrson Family and Sun Microsystems. The initial thrust was to provide the most comprehensive website on Periodontics including Tutorials, Case Studies and Continuing Education Credits.
- European Commission agrees to the European Council's 'Learning in the Information Society' action plan.
- Webtester and ChiTester developed at Weber State University through a grant from the Utah Higher Education Technology Initiative. ChiTester early history
- Sue Polyson and Robert Godwin-Jones, of Virginia Commonwealth University released the first beta version of Web course in a Box (WCB) in Spring, 1996. (See this 1997 presentation). This web-based system was designed to be an easy-to-use, template-based interface that allowed instructors to create an integrated set of web pages for presenting course material. The system featured logins for instructors and students, the ability for instructors to enroll students in their courses so that access to course materials could be controlled, the easy setup of web-based discussion forums for use by students within the class, document sharing through the upload of files to the discussion forum, schedule and announcement pages, content links, and personal home pages for both students and instructors. The WCB system was made available, free of charge, for use by any school that wished to use it. The source code was copyrighted by Virginia Commonwealth University, and Web Course in a Box was trademarked by VCU in 1997. Web Course in a Box was described in an article in "A Practical Guide to Teaching with the World Wide Web", by Polyson, Saltzberg, and Godwin-Jones, published in the September 1996 issue of Syllabus magazine, by Syllabus Press. For a feature and version history of web course in a box, please see,
- Doncaster College in South Yorkshire, England, submitted a bid under the "Further Education Competitiveness Fund" proposing to use the Fretwell Downing "Common Learning Environment" integrated into newsgroups, the WWW, and conferencing, all combined into an on-line learning environment. Diagram and a single paragraph from the bid, dated 4 March 1996. The full document is much more explicit, making reference to the use of email, conferencing, newsgroups for the delivery of National Vocational Qualifications and distance learning over the internet and the UK Joint Academic Network. Slides from a presentation, including diagram of the learning environment.
- 8 May 1996 - Paris, France: Murray Goldberg presents paper at the 5th WWW conference, introducing WebCT - See session PS10, paper P29. For paper, see: World Wide Web - Course Tool (Web-CT): An Environment for Building WWW-Based Courses. The reaction to WebCT caused Goldberg to begin giving away free licenses to the software. Word spread very quickly and within six months approximately 100 institutions were using WebCT.
- In January, Nat Kannan, Carl Tyson, and Michael Anderson form UOL Publishing (now VCampus) and release an Internet course delivery platform; the Java client accesses PLATO content on a CDC mainframe. In November, UOL releases a browser-based course authoring and delivery platform based on the Informix OO database. The UOL system supports multiple campuses (with "buildings" on each "campus" for the different academic functions) and enables multiple roles (admin/author/instructor/student) for every user on a course by course basis. UOL's virtual campus is adopted by Graybar Electric and the University of Texas TeleCampus (among others) in early 1997.
- Paul McKey publishes the design specifications for an "Interactive on-line Tutorial Session Model" in his Masters Thesis "The Development of the On-line Educational Institute", SCU, Australia, July 1996.
- Electronic, network-based assignment submission tool in use at Australian National University Department of Computer Science. Web-based course pages also implemented at ANU DCS (both submission tool and course pages may have been in use prior to 1996).
- The University of Michigan launches the UMIE project (the University of Michigan Instructional Environment), a combination of systems to enhance learning online and to create a Learning Management System for use by the campus.
- In the summer of 1996, the Research Station Petnica (Yugoslavia) started the action of digital transformation of teaching, published a digital book on the Internet and laid the foundations for online teaching.
- University of Southern Queensland (USQ) offers its first fully online program, a Graduate Certificate in Open and Distance Learning, using a system that linked together course materials presented in web pages, online discussion via newsgroups (NNTP) and a purpose-built system for online submission of student work.
- The development of COSE was funded from September 1996 to August 1999 by the JISC Technology Applications Programme (JTAP). COSE has continued to gain support from the Jisc in its work on interoperability.
- The JTAP programme also funded the Toomol project which produced the Colloquia P2P VLE, developed by Liber, Olivier, Britain and Beauvoir, which has had a major influence in the more recent development of the Personal Learning Environment (PLE) concept.
- World Wide Satellite Broadcasting (WSB) Inc. develops a satellite-based distance learning system using synchronized video and audio courseware provided by UCLA. Content is delivered via Philips' CleverCast content distribution system to Windows PCs running Active Desktop via the Astro MEASAT Direct To Home (DTH) network, covering Malaysia, Thailand and India.
- The TELSI (Telematic Environment for Language Simulations) VLE is developed at the University of Oulu in Finland. Development was headed by Eric Rouselle and was continued into present day Discendum Optima.
- Marine Corps Management and Simulation Office (MCMSO) adapts DOOM II into Marine Doom, a Virtual Learning Environment for training four-man fire teams.
- KnowledgePlanet introduced the world's first Web-based Learning Management System in 1996. See: KnowledgePlanet: History & Milestones
- Stephen Downes, Jeff McLaughlin and Terry Anderson demonstrate and document the MAUD (Multi-Academic User Domain), holding a Canadian Association for Distance Education Seminar on the system, Online Teaching and Learning, 29 January 1996.
- Michigan State University's Virtual University opened. By 1997, its fully online courses included registration, payment, quizzing, discussions, dropbox, and, of course, course content. The system was created and developed by in-house programmers. Now
- Garry Main and Kevan Gartland, University of Abertay Dundee, UK, A system (webtest) was developed and deployed for use in testing students in the School of Molecular and Life Sciences. This was later extended to allow images to be labelled, self-testing and teaching. Also in use at the time was the QuestionMark product. The work at Abertay was presented as a keynote talk at the BALANCE workshops KeyNote Presentations in 1997/8.
- Initial release of the ETUDES software at Foothill College, California.
- Real Education founded (later changed to eCollege.com) as an LMS/CMS Application Service Provider company.
- WEST (later WBTSystems) announce in early 1996 a new release of WEST (later renamed TopClass). Among the enhancements mentioned are: support of multiple-choice tests and "fill in the blanks" questions, including choosing questions randomly from a list (question bank?); support of multiple classes with multiple content and students able to take more than one class.
- The article Lotus Notes in the Telematic University written for LIGIS in September 1996 confirms that several US universities are using Lotus Notes for e-learning, including via a Web interface. It goes on to observe that "Lotus Notes already has offered for a year or more several of the groupware and Internet features that other systems like FirstClass and Microsoft Exchange are only just now getting".
- Another article in the same edition of LIGIS confirms that FirstClass, to the relief of many of its users, in August announced a Web interface. FirstClass, but see also FirstClass Education Summit - May 1996 Report) The 304-page PDF manual for the FirstClass Intranet Client (Part Number SOF3122) is widely and freely distributed by SoftArc across many bulletin boards and web servers and remains available at several universities (e.g. at the University of Maine], a long-standing user of FirstClass.
- Not to be outdone by the UK Open University, the FernUniversitat Hagen (German OU) described its web-based virtual campus in a LIGIS article in October 1996 on University of Hagen Online by Schlageter and others. The project "goes beyond current approaches in that it integrates all functions of a university, thus producing a complete and homogeneous system. This does not only include all kinds of learning material delivered via electronic network (most "online university" approaches focus almost exclusively on this aspect) - but for a promising approach the following is absolutely essential: user-friendly and powerful communication, especially also between users themselves for collaborative learning (peer learning) and for social interconnecting, possibilities of group-work (cscw), seminar support, new forms of exercise and practical via net, easy access to library and administration, information and tutoring systems".
- Microsoft announces MS Exchange at Networld+Interop. An article of the era speculates on its relevance to e-learning.
- An article nominates 1996 as "the year of virtual universities". There were a large number of conferences - in particular at Ed-Media Boston there was a packed session even though organised at short notice.
- WebSeminar (Gary Brown, Eric Miraglia, Doug Winther, and Information Management Group) (now retired, news release here) an interactive web-based space for integrating discussion and media rich modules.
- The Virtual Classroom (Brown, Burke and Miraglia). (retired) a web-based threaded composition environment. A WSU Boeing grant award and Microsoft, Information Management Group partnership
- Northern Virginia Community College (NVCC)'s Extended Learning Institute switches from Lotus Notes to FirstClass and uses First Class in over 35 courses during the Fall 1996 semester
- March 1996. Allaire releases Allaire Forums, "a Web conferencing application built entirely on the ColdFusion platform. Forums provided a feature-rich server application for creating Internet, Intranet and Interprise collaborative environments. Already in use by hundreds of leading companies worldwide, Forums was the first in a new line of end-user Web applications."
- Bruce Landon makes a proposal to British Columbia to set up a comparison service for VLEs, which made its first report (on nine systems) in 1997. It was first called Landonline, then later called Edutools.
- Hermann Maurer (Graz University of Technology, Austria) publishes "LATE: A Unified Concept for a Unified Teaching and Learning Environment" in the Journal of Universal Computer Science. Based on the Hyper-G/HyperWave system developed by Maurer, LATE prefigures many of the features available in virtual learning environments, including content-authoring modules, digital libraries, asynchronous and synchronous discussion, and virtual whiteboards.
- The University of Manitoba conducts an evaluation of course management systems that includes Learning Space (University of Washington), Top Class, WebCT and ToolBook.
- Iowa State University develops Classnet, a web-based "tightly integrated, automated class management system". It was created to help with the administrative aspects of course management.
- The Oracle Learning Architecture (OLA) is a course management system with over 75 training titles. It has the following features: Home page, bulletin board, Help, User Profile, My Courses, Course Catalog, and Reports. It served up web-based courses, download courses, vendor demos and assessments.
- Empower Corporation developed the Online Learning Infrastructure (OLI), a training management system that used a relational database as a central repository for courses and/or learning objects. It had built-in tools and templates for authoring learning objects. It also had a middleware layer called the Multimedia Learning Object Broker that mapped learning objects as they moved in and out of the database.
- TeamSpace's Learning Junction is an Internet-based training management system founded by several ex-Oracle employees. It was developed in Java. The program displayed a graphical list of courses, certification plans and needed skills. Students registered online, and were given an individualized learning plan.
- The Jisc Technology Applications Programme (JTAP) coMentor VLE starts development at the University of Huddersfield, UK. The coMentor web site indicates that a further [dissemination phase] of the software started in 1998.
- Work was funded at the University of Wales, Aberystwyth to further develop its Integrated Project Support Environment for Teaching started in 1992.
- Work funded at the University of Wales, Aberystwyth by the Joint Information Systems Committee Technology Applications Programme £164,000 for NEAT - Networked Expertise, Advise and Tuition. A system for students to obtain help across the Internet from tutors - sharing workspace, audio and video.
- Tufts University presents to Special Library Association. Article is published in Proceedings of the Contributed Paper Session to the Biological Sciences Division of the Special Libraries Association - 12 June 1996, describing the creation of networked relational document database which integrates text and multimedia and the creation of tools which address the changing needs in medical education

=== 1997 ===
- Digitalbrain plc, founded by David Clancy in 1997, quickly established itself as the most heavily used learning platform in the UK; which is still the case in April 2007. Digitalbrain was the first learning platform to be deployed using an on-demand software model and, as the name implies, the first designed around a user-centric approach. "A truly foresighted design" according to the heaviest users of the platform. The combination of the on-demand and user centric approach meant that a single, flexible learning platform could be rolled out across a host of different school and institutional user groups, each with multiple but inter-related user hierarchies, each with different software bundles and functional capabilities - easily, quickly and cheaply. At a time when users had little understanding of why they needed a learning platform, let alone what they would do with it, this approach encouraged user experimentation, at an affordable price.
- Early 1997, CourseInfo is founded by Dan Cane and Stephen Gilfus, an undergraduate student and teaching assistant, and launches the Interactive Learning Network 1.5 based on scripts that Dan Cane began writing in 2006. The product is one of the first systems to be based on a relational database with internet forms and scripts that provided announcements, document uploading and quiz and survey functionality.
- In 1997, Instructional Design for New Media – an online course on how to develop online courses was created using forums, interactive exercises and the notion of collaborative learning by a community of instructors and students. Developed by a Canadian consortium led by Christian Blanchette (Learn Ontario) and funded by the Canadian government, it was featured in the May 1998.
- Brandon Hall publishes the "Web-Based Training Cookbook: everything you need to know for online training" (New York: John Wiley). The book contains many examples of online training software and content already in commercial use. Brandon Hall also publishes the first of his annual reviews of Learning Management Systems, entitled "Training Management Systems: How to Choose a Program Your Company Can Live With." There are 27 learning management systems listed in this report.
- Elliott Masie publishes the second edition of the "Computer Training Handbook" (the first version was published in 1995, and co-authored by Rebekah Wolman). In this book Elliott describes teaching a pilot course via the Internet called "Training Skills for Teaching New Technology". The book also has a chapter entitled "On-line and Internet-Based Learning".
- The Stanford Learning Lab, an applied research organization, was created to improve teaching and learning with effective use of information technologies. It carried out many projects that developed techniques and tools for large lecture, geographically distributed, and project-based courses. A study of web-supported large lecture course, The Word and the World tested online structured reading assignments, asynchronous forums, and student projects. Software developed included: panFora: an online discussion environment for the development of critical thinking skills; CourseWork: an online, rationale-based, problem set design and administration environment; E-Folio: ubiquitous, web-based, portable electronic knowledge databases that are private, personalized and sharable; Helix: web-based software developed to coordinate the iterative review of research papers; and RECALLtm: to capture, index, retrieve, and replay concept generation over time in the form of a sketch and the corresponding audio and video rationale annotation.
- In June 1997, Gotham Writers' Workshop (writingclasses.com) launched its online division; classes feature blackboard lectures, class discussion bulletin boards, interactive chat, homework posting/individual teacher response, group assignment posting/group critique files.
- Virginia Commonwealth University licensed Web Course in a Box (WCB) to madDuck Technologies in early 1997. madDuck Technologies was a company formed in early 1997 by Sue Polyson, Robert Godwin-Jones and Steve Saltzberg. The company was formed by the WCB developers in order to provide support and services to other educational institutions who were using WCB. WCB version 1 was released in February 1997 (beta version were released in 1996, and the product was in use at VCU and several other institutions in 1996). WCB V2 was released in September 1997 and added web-based quizzing, as well as more course site customization to the feature set.
- The Oncourse Project at Indiana University utilizes the notion and design of a "template - based course management system." Other systems used a similar approach including CourseInfo, WebCT, and other Course Management systems.
- Lotus LearningSpace deployed as the learning and student team environment for the Indiana University Accounting MBA program and reported in the proceedings of HICSS-32.
- Lotus LearningSpace presented at NERCOMP 24 March 1997: "Interactive Distributed Learning Solutions: Lotus Notes-Based LearningSpace" by Peter Rothstein, Director, Research and Development Programs, Lotus Institute.
- Plateau released TMS 2, an enterprise-class learning management system. TMS 2 was adopted by both the U.S. Air Force and Bristol-Myers Squibb at the time of its release.
- The Bodington VLE deployed at the University of Leeds, UK. (The Bodington System - Patently Previous) By 1997, the Bodington VLE included many of the features listed in the Blackboard US Patent #6,988,138, including the variable-role authentication/authorization system. A full record exists of all activity in the Bodington VLE at Leeds going back to October 1997.
- First versions of COSE deployed at Staffordshire University. COSE includes facilities for the publication and reuse of content, facilities for the creation and management of groups and sub-groups of learners by tutors and for the assignment of learning opportunities to those groups and to individual learners. For article (1997) see Active Learning with COSE. This article was republished in 1998 in Australia. Published mid-1998.
- Ziff Davis launches ZDNet University for $4.95/month. Offering courses in programming, graphics and web management.
- Cisco Systems In 1993, Cisco embarked on an initiative to design practical, cost-effective networks for schools. It quickly became apparent that designing and installing the networks was not enough, schools also needed some way to maintain the networks after they were up and running. Cisco Senior Consulting Engineer George Ward developed training for teachers and staff for maintenance of school networks. The students in particular were eager to learn and the demand was such that in 1997 it led to the creation of the Cisco Networking Academy Program. The Cisco Networking Academy Program, established in 1997, teaches students networking and other information technology-related skills, preparing them for jobs as well as for higher education in engineering, computer science and related fields. Since its launch, the program has grown to more than 10,000 Academies in 50 U.S. states and more than 150 countries with a curriculum taught in nine different languages. More than 400,000 students participate in Academies operating in high schools, colleges and universities, technical schools, community-based organizations, and other educational programs around the world. The Networking Academy program blends face-to-face teaching with web-based curriculum, hands-on lab exercises, and Internet-based assessment.
- Fretwell Downing, based in Sheffield, England, is working on the development of a virtual learning environment, under the auspices of the "LE Club" a partnership between the company and eleven English Further Education colleges. Dr Bob Banks's outline specification for a Learning Environment. The "LE" had arisen from a 1995-1997 EU ACTS Project - Renaissance - in which Fretwell Downing was the prime contractor.
- Convene International is recruited by Microsoft to become their first Education marketing partner. Convene helps Microsoft with establishing licensing parameters for the ASP companies.
- Foundation of Blackboard Inc as consulting firm.
- WebAssign developed by faculty at North Carolina State University for the online submission of student assignments and a mechanism for immediate assessment and feedback.
- WebCT spins out of UBC forming independent company with several hundred university customers.
- Release of TWEN (The West Education Network), a system which "connects you with the most useful and current legal information and news, while helping you to organize your course information and participate in class discussions". (See Homepage)
- Future Learning Environment (FLE) research and development project starts in Helsinki, Finland (See Homepage)
- Stephen Downes presents Web-Based Courses: The Assiniboine Model at NAWeb 1997, describing the LMS in detail.
- A collaborative writing project between Junior High students and University pre-teachers, using Filemaker Pro to create collaborative writing spaces, January-March 1997.
- The Manhattan Project (now known as the Manhattan Virtual Classroom) is launched at Western New England College in Springfield, MA as a supplement to classroom courses in February 1997. It is later released as an open source project. The Manhattan Project (history and description)
- Delivery starts of the LETTOL course in South Yorkshire, England. Characteristics: delivery over the Internet; materials, tasks/assignments, discussion-board. chat system all accessible by browser; browser-based amending of the materials; learners and tutors all over the world, with learners enrolled to several of the institutions in the (then) South Yorkshire Further Education Consortium, and tutors employed by several different institutions.
- The Web Project at California State University, Northridge, adapted HyperNews from The Turing Institute, a shareware discussion board that created specific courses with faculty and students. In addition, QuizMaker from the University of Hawaii, and Internet Relay Chat (IRC), were shortly thereafter added to the shareware suite and indexed to faculty webpages. The Virtual 7 were seven faculty who began to teach online in 1995, with this software.
- University of Aberdeen starts a project to research and evaluate web-based course management and communication tools. Project notes are available, including the original administrator guides for TopClass v.1.2.2b, October 1997 (PDF). Aberdeen ultimately chooses WebCT, and rolls out a live system in 1998.
- Pioneer developed by MEDC (University of Paisley). Pioneer was an online learning environment developed initially for colleges in Scotland. Pioneer was web-based and featured: online course materials (published by the lecturers themselves); integral email to allow communications between students and tutors; forum tools; chat tools; timeatable/calendar; activities. The main driver for Pioneer was Jackie Galbraith. When MEDC was closed, the Pioneer development team moved to SCET in 1998 taking Pioneer with them when it became SCETPioneer. SCETPioneer was used by Glasgow Colleges and a number of other colleges and schools in Scotland. SCET merged with the SCCC and became Learning and Teaching Scotland
- Bob Jensen and Petrea Sandlin republish "Electronic Teaching and Learning: Trends in Adapting to Hypertext, Hypermedia, and Networks in Higher Education" - first published 1994, text of both versions available via hyperlink.
- Speakeasy Studio and Café (Gary Brown, Travis Beard, Dennis Bennett, Eric Miraglia, and others) (now retired, but many references remain on WSU websites, e.g., these) a course delivery system hosted by Washington State University] and used on multiple campuses for web-based discussion and collaborative writing. Speakeasy had a primitive portfolio view that allowed instructors and students to find all the writings of a given author within a course space, by discussion topic or in a calendar view.
- The Cougar Crystal Ball (Gary Brown, Randy Lagier, Peg Collins, Greg Turner & Lori Eveleth-Baker and others). an online learning profile and corresponding university resource inventory, implements ideas related to selective release of material based on learner preparedness.
- The WSU OWL (Online Writing Lab) (Gary Brown, Eric Miraglia, Greg Turner Rahman, Jessie Wolf, & Dennis Bennett) (still in use at WSU and by others) an interactive forum for peer tutoring in writing (WSU Boeing grant award), involves a simple threaded discussion. OWL retires in favor of eTutoring March 2008.
- The VIRTUS project at University of Cologne, Germany, has started the development of the web-based ILIAS learning management system in 1997. A first version with an integrated web-based authoring environment has been going online at 2 November 1998. In 2000 ILIAS became open source software under the GPL.
- Serf was invented at the University of Delaware by Dr. Fred Hofstetter during the summer of 1997. Initially used to deliver the U.S.'s first PBS TeleWEBcourse (on Internet Literacy), Serf has been used to deliver hundreds of courses. Serf "began as a self-paced multimedia learning environment that enabled students to navigate a syllabus, access instructional resources, communicate, and submit assignments over the Web," and the Serf feature set was expanded from 1997 to 1999 as described in this article (from College & University Media Review (Fall, 1999), 99–123), which includes a detailed table describing the history of Serf's feature development for versions 1 through 3.
- University of Maryland University College (UMUC) offers its first classes using WebTycho, a customized "program developed by UMUC to facilitate course delivery via the World Wide Web."
- Paul McKey launches BigTree Online, a commercial, integrated online learning environment for managing the Apple certification program in Asia Pacific. Built with FileMaker Pro from a model first described in his Masters Thesis in 1996.
- Saba founded. Now one of the pre-eminent corporate learning management systems.
- FutureMedia (established in 1982) commenced the development of Solstra with BT Group PLC, launching the first version of the product in February 1998. (Annual report for 2001 to SEC)
- (March 1997) Oleg Liber presents his paper "Viewdata and the World Wide Web: Information or Communication" at CAL 97 at the University of Exeter, England. In it he looks back to the use of videotex in education in the 1980s and forward to a more communications-oriented Web - what we would call Web 2.0 these days - but this was 9 years ago. The paper is worthy of note since Liber is still active in e-learning and as one of the few papers dealing with history of e-learning.
- Formal Systems Inc. of Princeton, NJ, USA introduces an internet version of its Assessment Management System, which started as a DOS program in 1990. (In 2000, Formal Systems changed its name to Pedagogue Solutions).
- Educom's IMS Design Requirements released in document dated 19 December 1997.
- Teaching in the switched-on classroom: An introduction to electronic education and HyperCourseware is published online by Kent Norman at the University of Maryland, College Park, MD: Laboratory for Automation Psychology.
- Bob Godwin-Jones and Sue Polyson give a presentation at EDUCOM '97 entitled "Tools for Creating and Managing Interactive Web-based Learning". The presentation compared the features of Web Course in a Box and TopClass. The slides for the presentation are still available online.
- The MadDuck Technologies web site listed the many distinctive features of the Web Course in a Box course management system.
- An online column by Tom Creed called "The Virtual Companion" lists a number of course management systems including Web Course in a Box, WebCT, Nicenet, NetForum, and WebCT.
- Virtual-U, a course management system for universities, was developed at Simon Fraser University (SFU) in British Columbia, Canada. A design paper Virtual-U Development Plan: Issues and Process dated 25 June 1997 gives a clear description including screen shots. By early 1998 the system was deployed in a number of universities and colleges across Canada, including SFU, Laval, Douglas College, McGill, University of Winnipeg, University of Guelph, University of Waterloo, and Aurora College. (Source: The Peak, Simon Fraser University's Student Newspaper, Volume 98, Issue 6, 16 February 1998.)
- A press release dated 10 March 1997 announced that "DLJ's Pershing Division Aligns with Princeton Learning Systems and KnowledgeSoft to Create On-line University". Knowledgesoft's LOIS (Learning Organization Information System) was described by Brandon Hall, in his book The Web-based Training Cookbook (New York: John Wiley, 1997), as an "innovative Web-based training administration tool." It had three core modules: a competency management system, an assessment system, and a training management system.
- The University of Lincoln and Humberside (ULH) in the UK (later the University of Lincoln) begins development of its "Virtual Campus" software, which was later incorporated into a spin-out company called Teknical, which in 2003 was bought by Serco. Historical references seem fragmentary but some indication of the date of origin is contained in the overview material on the joint SRHE/Lincolnconference on 'Managing Learning Innovation' which took place on 1 and 2 September 97 at the university. Substantial funding came from BP as noted in a web page of the former Learning Development Unit at ULH.
- Two key papers on Role-Based Access Control (RBAC) are published: a Kuhn paper on separation of duty; necessary and sufficient conditions for separation safety - and an Osborn paper (in PostScript) on the relationship between RBAC and multilevel security mandatory access (MLS/MAC) security policy models; role lemma relating RBAC and multilevel security.
- Al Seagren and Britt Watwood present "The Virtual Classroom: What Works?" at the Annual International Conference of the Chair Academy. Reno, NV. See ERIC Document Reproduction Service No. ED407029. This presentation reviewed two years of the use of Lotus Notes as a learning management system in a masters and doctoral level education degree from the University of Nebraska.
- July 1997: The Report of the National Committee of Enquiry into Higher Education, usually called the Dearing Report, is published in the UK. Many of its recommendations were influential not only in the development of e-learning but in the development of the national-level support structures for it, including leading eventually to the Higher Education Academy. The report web site is maintained by the University of Leeds.
- April 1997: The project Kolibri (Kooperatives Lernen mittels Internet-basierter Informationstechniken, Cooperative Learning with Internet-based IT) was launched at the University Dortmund and went live in February 1998 with a course for Fuzzy Logic. The Kolibri system was a generic web-based application which supported multiple courses and several user groups (student administration, tutors, students). The application supported personal course histories, personal notes to content, automatic tests and interactive cooperative applets for teamwork in lessons. The system further contains a chat-system and a blackboard for information exchange. A report in German is available as PDF
- In January 1997, Scott Gray, Tricia Gray, Kendell Welch, and Debra Woods launch Useractive an online learning resource dedicated to the useractive learning pedagogical technique. This technique has its roots in constructivism except with computer aided guidance. This asynchronous system is enabled by embedding tutorials and learning management functions into development tools.
- In October 1997, the French University of Technology at Compiègne (UTC) launched the first French fully on-line degree, Dicit, training documentation engineers, using the Lotus Learning Space platform. The degree was created by Pr. Dominique Boullier and Pr. Jean-Paul Barthes. It offered 15 different courses, a serious game and several case studies on CD-ROM as well as a close coaching of the 20 to 25 students enrolled each year. The format was more of a blended learning type since the students met every two months for a face to face session. The degree was given for 10 years until 2007. Papers were written on this successful experimentation: BOULLIER, Dominique.- " Les choix techniques sont des choix pédagogiques : les dimensions multiples d’une expérience de formation à distance "A 50 dimensions multiples d'une expèrience de formation à distance.pdf, Sciences et Techniques Educatives, vol. 8, n° 3-4 /2001, pp. 275–299.

=== 1998 ===
- On 11 August 1998 Indiana University, IUPUI Campus, issued a press release "Prototype for Web-based Teaching and Learning Environment to be Tested at IUPUI This Year".
- Ucompass.com is founded on 23 July 1998 and begins marketing its Educator Course Management System.
- CourseWork, a web-based, problem set manager, was developed by the at Stanford University's Learning Lab. It formed the core of the CourseWork CMS. This version supported authoring, distribution, completion, and reviewing of automatically graded assignments by students and instructors.
- Humboldt State University's Courseware Development Center] builds the ExamMaker application for online testing. ExamMaker supports banks of questions, which may include audio and/or video segments, that may be true/false, fill-in-the-blank, multiple choice, or essay. Essay questions are emailed to the teacher for grading, then sent back to ExamMaker to display the graded essays to the students. ExamMaker grades all other types of questions and provides the student immediate feedback as soon as the exam is completed, including an explanation of the correct answers, and automatically posts the grade. Full Description: Assured Student Access To Computing And The Network
- On 1 June 1998, a paper describing a web based Peer Review and Assessment tool developed by the Courseware Development Center at Humboldt State University was presented at the 1998 ASEE Annual Conference & Exposition: Engineering Education Contributing to U.S. Competitiveness. The Peer Review was a set of web forms that enabled students to upload documents, review each other's work, and for an instructor to review and grade student's uploaded work. More.
- On 2 November 1998, the web-based learning management system ILIAS is gone online at University of Cologne. Within one year more than 30 courses have been created and published for blended learning in economics, business administration and social sciences.
- In the spring of 1998 TeleTOP, a set of fill-in forms on top of Lotus Domino, saw the light at Twente University, The Netherlands. It was not the first ELO that was used there, but it was the first one where teachers themselves could create a course without any ICT knowledge. Core of this product was and is the central task-scheme ("The Roster"), where the teacher could create a row of activities for each week. A demo course has been available online since 1998. You still can login with UN: docent.test and PW: docent.test. Unfortunately this is an old version of TeleTOP. Since 1998 the look and feel has completely changed and the ELO has a lot more functionalities. Modules like Digital Portfolio and Assessment Centre have been developed to measure the pupils' competence and developments. Open standards such as SCORM, IEE-LOM, Dublin Core and AICC where implemented from the start for reuse and research possibilities. Further information can be found on Teletop.
- On 14 May 1998, Indiana University ARTI receives a "Disclosure of Invention" for the Oncourse (case #9853) describing the invention of a comprehensive course management system by Ali Jafari and his WebLab developers, a comprehensive CMS system with message board, announcement, chat, syllabus, etc. including the dynamic method of creating courses for students and faculty based on the data from the campus SIS system.
- The Cisco Networking Academy Management System (CNAMS) is released to facilitate communication and course management of the largest blended learning initiative of its time, the Cisco Networking Academy. It includes tools to maintain rosters, gradebooks, forums, as well as a scalable, robust assessment engine. Cisco Networking Academy Program.
- The Advanced Information Technology Lab at Indiana University-Purdue University Indianapolis piloted Oncourse. (A description of the initial software was published in 1999 in The Journal.)
- Nicenet Internet Classroom Assistant (ICA2) is launched with web-based conferencing, personal messaging, document sharing, scheduling and link/resource sharing to a variety of learning environments. See their website.
- DiscoverWare, Inc. builds and begins to deploy its "Nova" course management system, involving a client/server architecture to deploy rich interactive content in a desktop application, and storing/sharing information on content, users, courses, and quizzes on a central server. This was an adaptive LMS, in that quizzes were generated based on the user's progress through the content, and courses were generated based on the user's responses to a quiz. The playback engine evolved a browser-based version that was SCORM Level 2 Compliant, enabling deployment of DiscoverWare content in third-party LMS such as Pathware.
- Public release of EDUCOM/NLII Instructional Management Systems Specifications Document Version 0.5 (29 April 1998), produced by an IMS Technical Team including Steve Griffin (COLLEGIS Research Institute), Andy Doyle (International Thomson Publishers), Bob Alcorn (Blackboard), Brad Cox (George Mason University), Frank Farance (Farance Inc), John Barkley (NIST), Ken Schweller (Buena Vista University), Kirsten Boehner (COLLEGIS Research Institute), Mike Pettit (Blackboard), Neal Nored (IBM), Tom Rhodes (NIST), Tom Wason (UNC), Udo Schuermann (Blackboard). Available as DOC.
- Blackboard LLC merges with CourseInfo LLC to form Blackboard Inc and changes the CourseInfo product name to Blackboard's CourseInfo.
- Web Course in a Box, Version 3 is released in 1998. This version added a WhiteBoard feature as well as Student Portfolios, Access Tracking, Course Copying between instructors, and batch account administration.
- The Instructional Technology Group at Yale University Yale University puts the "Classes" system into production for Fall semester. (A copy of the original site is captured in the Internet Archive for Spring of 1999.)
- WebTestr built and deployed by Nicholas Crosby at SIAST.
- Fretwell-Downing Education Ltd (now part of Tribal Group plc) builds a pilot web-based learning environment for use in delivering accredited courses in internet skills (information retrieval, web design and online collaboration) in the UK. (Partial details, dated 30 December 1997.) The learning environment is a contribution to the work of the Living IT consortium, which includes The Sheffield College and Manchester College or Arts and Technology as well as Fretwell-Downing Education Ltd, and which had been delivering these courses since 1997. (In 1999, the company demonstrates this learning environment as part of its successful tender to build a larger, more sophisticated learning environment for learndirect, which was subsequently used by hundreds of thousands of learners in England and Wales.)
- Teemu Leinonen and Hanni Muukkonen publish a paper on Future Learning Environment - Innovative Methods and Applications for Collaborative Learning.
- Future Learning Environment (FLE) research and development project releases the first version of FLE software. The FLE software is afterwards known as Fle3.
- The survey article "Embedding computer conferencing in university teaching" (Mason and Bacsich) is published in Computers and Education, Volume 30, Number 3, April 1998, pp. 249–258. This describes experiences with using CoSy and FirstClass in online learning at the Open University in the period up to 1995. (Article available online e.g. via Ingenta.)
- CU Online, the virtual campus of the University of Colorado, is described in an online article by Terri Taylor Straut first presented in 1997 at the FLISH97 conference in Sheffield, UK. CU Online uses the LMS from Real Education, later eCollege.com.
- Virtual U, "a Web Based Environment Customised to Support Collaborative Learning and Knowledge Building", is described in an online article by Linda Harasim, Tom Calvert and others also first presented at FLISH97. The paper makes it clear that development of Virtual-U has been under way since 1994.
- CTLSilhouette (Gary Brown Randy Lagier, Peg Collins, Josh Yeidel, Greg Turner & Lori Eveleth-Baker) an online survey and automated response generator. Allows authors to use create custom question types in addition to questions made by wizard. Lacks scoring and feedback features of online test/quiz. CTLSilhouette powers The TLT Group's Flashlight Online system, which includes the Flashlight Current Student Inventory item bank, a useful tool for evaluations of Virtual Learning Environments and scholarship of teaching and learning by instructors.
- NextEd founded by its CEO Terry Hilsberg in 1998 to deliver global e-learning from bases in Hong Kong and Australia. Its first prominent university client/partner was the University of Southern Queensland, a major Australian distance learning provider.
- Paul McKey joins NextEd as a foundation employee and CTO and begins development of an online learning management system first described in his Masters Thesis "The Development of the On-line Educational Institute", SCU, Australia, July 1996.
- In September 1998 the Computer Science department at RMIT University, Australia began delivering its online courses with Serf. Over 10,000 Open University Australia student enrollments used Serf's comprehensive LMS features until 2004 when RMIT's corporate Blackboard was phased in. During this period, Serf versions 1 to 3 hosted 13 ugrad CS courses, 5 pgrad CS courses and 3 continuously repeating, short IT courses.
- September 1998: The EU SCHEMA project releases via the Oulu team a "State of the art" review specification on CMC techniques applicable to open and distance learning (Deliverable D5.1). This includes a feature and architectural comparison of FirstClass, LearningSpace, TopClass and WebCT. It also describes a desired system Proto. There is a full discussion of roles. The diagrams are particularly informative. See "The use of CMC in applied social science training".
- In May 1998, Interlynx Multimedia, Inc. of Toronto, received a contract to develop a learning management system for the Canadian Imperial Bank of Commerce. The LMS, designed by Dr. Gary Woodill and Dr. Karen Anderson was built in Microsoft ASP. It included a rudimentary authoring system that allowed HTML pages and multiple choice questions to be built and posted online. The generic code for this LMS became the PROFIS LMS, which was then licensed to several other corporations. Later Operitel Corporation of Peterborough acquired the rights to this LMS which was then renamed LearnFlex. Operitel was sold to Open Text in 2012, and Gary Woodill is now CEO of i5 Research.
- The Aircraft Industry CBT Committee (AICC) certifies web-based Pathware 3 as its "First Instructional Management Product".
- Asymetrix (later becoming Click2Learn and then SumTotal) buys Meliora Systems' software for learning management called Ingenium, and merges it with its own learning management product, Toolbook II Librarian, a training management and administration system used with an Oracle, MS SQL Server or other ODBC database. Authoring is done either through Asymetrix' Toolbook II Instructor, Toolbook II Assistant, or through Asymetrix IconAuthor.
- In October 1998, CoursePackets.com is founded by Alan Blake, a University of Texas at Austin student, with the goal of posting course packs online.
- By the end of 1998, Indiana University's Oncourse system had grown to support some 9,000 students.
- December 1998 the School of Pharmacy at the University of Strathclyde launch their online learning environment SPIDER
- WebDAV gave a standard method of uploading documents. It was already described in publications in 1998. E.g. WEBDAV: IETF Standard for Collaborative Authoring on the Web IEEE Internet Computing, September/October 1998, pages 34–40 and Collaborative Authoring on the Web: Introducing WebDAV] Bulletin of the American Society for Information Science, Vol. 25, No. 1, October/November 1998, pages 25–29.
- By May 1998, a number of course management systems and collaborative environments were available. These systems included CyberProf, a course management system from the University of Illinois; Mallard 3.0, a course management system from the University of Illinois; netLearningPlace, a collaborative environment for teaching and learning; PlaceWare, software for live presentations; POLIS, a system from the University of Arizona; The Learning Manager (TLM), from Campus America, Inc.; Toolbox II from Asymetrix Corporation; TopClass, from WBT Systems; Virtual Classroom Interface (VCI), from the University of Illinois; Virtual Object Interactive Classroom Environment (VOICE), a graphic MOO; Web Course in a Box, developed at Virginia Commonwealth University; WebCT, from the University of British Columbia; Web Instructional Services Headquarters (WISH), from Penn State University; and Web Lecture System (WLS), a web lecturing system from North Carolina State University.(Source: Distance Learning Environments Feature List, University of Iowa, last updated 13 May 1998). Of these, WebCT is by far the most widely used with licenses at roughly 500 institutions by year end.

=== 1999 ===
- Fronter, a European software company, launches its environment for web based collaboration. During 1999 to 2001, the system is implemented by the majority of Norwegian higher education institutions and used as their platform for learning and collaboration.
- In January 1999 CoursePackets.com goes live, serving dozens of courses at the University of Texas at Austin. The service allowed for the posting of course packs online at a substantial discount over the cost of printed materials. By May 1999, CoursePackets.com begins work on a courseware system for launch in January 2000. The courseware system is comparable to Blackboard, and actively marketed as "CourseNotes.com" beginning in the summer of '99.
- February 1999: Ossidian Technologies is launched in Dublin, Ireland. Within 6 months the company has developed OLAS, its first web-based LMS. The company begins the process of developing a complete library of eLearning for wireless telecom (cellular, satellite, broadcast, personal and fixed wireless, operations).
- September 1999: The IEEE magazine Web-based Learning and Collaboration publishes A Framework for Online Learning: The Virtual-U, describing the history of the Virtual-U system from its inception in 1993. There are screen shots and descriptions. In particular it has a "user interface that gives instructors or moderators the ability to easily set up collaborative groups and define structures, tasks, and objectives". Further, system administrators have tools to help in "creating and maintaining accounts, defining access privileges, and establishing courses on the system".
- In October 1999, The UCLA School of Dentistry Media Center and Dr. Glenn Clark, develop an Internet-based authoring tool, labeled Internet Courseware (iic), which provides DDS students simulation modules for diagnosis and treatment planning of patients across a large breadth of possible medical conditions as well as access to lecture notes, exam reviews, course supplements and faculty contact information. Users are presented access to virtual patients based on class, previous coursework and patient/dentist activity within the system. The project was described in the Journal of Dental Education in 1999 (Clark GT, Carnahan J, Masson P and Watanabe, T. Case-Based Courseware for Distance Learning. J. Dent Educ. 63:71 (#191) 1999).
- In October 1999 Liber and Britain publish Framework for Pedagogical Evaluation of Virtual Learning Environments (MS Word file), a study for the United Kingdom Joint Information Systems Committee evaluating 12 different VLEs in detail. The report contains a schematic of a prototypical VLE, comprising 15 generic functionalities, and describes each of these functionalities in turn. There is a narrative description of each of the evaluated VLEs, and a comparative table summarising which features each provides.
- The Oncourse Project invented and introduced the notion of "Enterprise Course management system" where data from the Student Information System (SIS) was used to automatically and dynamically create CMS course site for all the courses offered at the IUPUI Campus (more than 6,000 courses offered to more than 27,000 students).
- Martin Dougiamas trials early prototypes of Moodle at Curtin University of Technology, built during 1998 and 1999. This paper "Improving the effectiveness of tools for Internet-based education" published in January 2000 details one case study and includes screenshots.
- The LON-CAPA project is started at Michigan State University.
- Desire2Learn is founded.
- The University of Michigan launches CourseTools, originally a product of the UMIE project (launched in 1996), and moved into its own development and production team due to the scale and scope of the LMS being launched and created.
- The Omnium Project based at The College of Fine Arts at the University of New South Wales ran its first global creative studio project online for 50 design students from 11 countries.
- September 1999 - The brand new Technical University of British Columbia admits its first students. Their 'Course Management System' is a home-grown system with 2+ years of development behind it at this point.
- Web Course in a Box, version 4 was released by madDuck Technologies in early 1999. WCB Version 4, added a gradebook and assignment manager. Companion products, Web Campus in a Box (for creating web pages for a department or program) and Web CourseBuilder Toolbox (for creating faculty web pages and forums, and course listings that were independent of the WCB system) were released in this same time period.
- WebCT purchased by Universal Learning Technology. Roughly 1000 campuses using WebCT by end of year.
- "Courseware Accessibility Study"] published, evaluating seven online courseware systems for their accessibility.
- Stephen Downes publishes Web-Based Courses: The Assiniboine Model in the Online Journal of Distance Learning Administration.
- The University of South Australia launches its web-based online learning platform, UniSAnet in March 1999. UniSAnet was developed over 9 months in 1998 and 1999, following a paper to its Academic Board in May 1998.
- Wolfgang Appelt and Peter Mambrey publish a paper on using BSCW as a virtual learning environment.
- ETUDES 2.3 released. ETUDES 2.5 is released in December. The system is used at several community colleges in California, including Foothill, LasPositas, and Miracosta.
- "Practical Know How: Distance Education and Training over the Internet" (Jissen Nouhau Inta-netto de Enkaku Kyouiku/Kenshuu) by Douyama Shinichi published in April 1999 by NTT publishing. ISBN 4-7571-0016-7. "It would seem easy to begin distance learning and distance education over the Internet, as an extension of (conventional) distance learning. When it comes to teaching several hundred students in this way, there are a number of problems still to be resolved at this time. In this book we will consider, the selection of teaching materials, making online contents, management methods, and introduce concrete practical know how with good cost performance and lots of practical advice." Chapter one details the trial of an Internet distance learning system, from sending out invitations to graduation.
- Sheffield company Fretwell Downing is marketing its "LE" (Learning Environment) product. September 1999 product overview.
- Washington State University publishes online a comparison of 24 VLE's, focusing on eight that were considered candidates for adoption at WSU. (Note: Only the final draft survives in the archives.)
- Thorough "Comparison of Online Course Delivery Software Products" published by Marshall University - with stated last update of 1 October 1999 - examining in detail the features and functionalities of 16 mainly US and Canadian systems.
- The Bridge (Gary Brown, Mathew Shirey, Dennis Bennett, Greg Turner-Rahman). (now retired, but available available read-only) a course management system with sub-spaces for teams that empowers students to create resource objects (threaded discussion, file upload, web links, notes, and quizzes) in the course. Bridge also had a "personal workspace" that provided the same collaborative and ePortfolio tools to individuals outside any course offering. The concept was not fully implemented as there was no mechanism to authorize users into one's personal workspace.
- Northern Virginia Community College (NVCC)'s Extended Learning Institute (ELI) begins using Allaire Forums for web-based conferencing in a variety of online/distance courses.
- University of Maryland University College (UMUC)'s unveils Version 2.0 of its customized WebTycho program with a new interface design. Through Fall 1999, UMUC has installed WebTycho servers on three continents and served over 26,000 students and faculty in over 1,000 WebTycho courses.
- In spring 1999 the development of the open source LMS OLAT was initiated by Sabina Jeger, Franziska Schneider and Florian Gnägi to support a tutoring course with 900 students at University of Zurich. The system was put into production in fall 1999 where the 900 students registered to 25 classes that were coached by older students. This first version of OLAT was built on LAMP technology. Later, the system was completely rebuilt on Java EE technology to support the e-learning needs of a whole campus.
- IBM's Lotus group buys Macromedia's Pathware 4 learning management system. This LMS is later merged into the Lotus Learning Space LMS. For article on the purchase, see here.
- Isopia (founded in 1998) entered the e-Learning landscape in 1999 with the launch of its Integrated Learning Management System (ILMS), its Web-based infrastructure software. Built on Enterprise Java Beans, Isopia claimed to be "a flexible, open system that allows for massive scalability and adapts to a variety of learning needs and rapidly-growing user communities". Isopia certainly rapidly grew in clients and deals (e.g. see the industry testimonials to its feature list from 1999 and early 2000 here until being bought by Sun Microsystems in 2001. See Learning Trends by Elliott Masie.
- Knowledge Navigators International releases its third version of LearningEngine as MyLearningPlace. Used by the United Nations Development Programme for several years for worldwide communities of practice and adopted by large architectural firm in CA. Company closed in 2001. New incarnation of software lives as Coachingplatform.com.
- "First Annual WebCT Conference on Learning Technologies" takes place at University of British Columbia in Vancouver, Canada from 17 to 18 June. Tim Barker presents a paper "Community Based Virtual Learning: A WebCT Physics Course" comparing three VLEs (WebCT, Topclass and Learning Space) plus Eventware (web annotations & chat), Ceilidh & Tree of Knowledge (discussion boards), Netmeeting (Whiteboard, chat etc.), Inspiration (Concept Mapping) & Composer/Writers Assistant (scaffolds writing process). Additionally Tim proposes integrating a Learning Companion. This conference represents a milestone as one of the first VLE user conferences. It is a significant success with 700 in attendance and poses a logistical exercise for organisers who were originally expecting between 50 and 100. Registration had to be closed due to the large numbers over a month before the conference date.
- 5 December 1999: Randy Graebner's proposal for his master's thesis, Online Education Through Shared Resources.
- The BENVIC project started in late 1999 and ran for two years. Its aim was to benchmark the various virtual campuses (i.e. university-level distance e-learning services) operating across Europe. The BENVIC web site contains several useful outcomes. The project became quiescent in early 2002. It represented a move beyond benchmarking VLEs to benchmarking e-learning at a higher level, i.e. the services which the VLEs underpinned.
- Dennis Tsichritzis of the University of Geneva publishes "Reengineering the University" (Communications of the ACM, Vol. 42, Issue 6, June 1999). One reviewer observes "This is a must-read article for academics" but later cautions that "most traditional college students, particularly in the US, do not have the self-discipline to adjust to the educational environment Tsichritzis describes."
- Scholastic Corporation publishes Read180, an application for Macs & PCs to improve reading skills in schools. Read180 shipped with sets of CD-ROMs on various topics, each with video presentations and interactive tests. Audio recording sessions by students were sent over the network to a teacher's workstation for evaluation.
