= Jeff Stein =

Jeff Stein may refer to:

- Jeff Stein (author), SpyTalk columnist and National Security Editor for Congressional Quarterly's website, CQ Politics
- Jeffrey M. Stein, Republican nominee for the U.S. House of Representatives; see United States House of Representatives elections in Maryland, 2006#District 8
- Jeff Stein, a character from the British soap opera Dream Team
- Jeffery Stein, co-founder of Learning Technology Partners
- Jeff Stein, economics reporter formerly at The Washington Post, currently with The Washington Sun
