= Bad Day (viral video) =

1996 viral video

Video still as the protagonist strikes the computer monitor off his desk using his computer keyboard

Bad Day (also known as Badday, Computer rage, Office rage or badday.mpg) is a 27-second viral video released in 1996, where a frustrated office worker assaults his cubicle computer. It has circulated virally online since 1997. The video became a cultural embodiment of computer rage, and is the subject of several parodies and ad campaigns.

Technology company Loronix Information Systems staged the video to promote its new digital video recording system. It is often mistaken for genuine, unscripted events.

== Plot ==
In the surveillance-style video, an office worker in his cubicle is becoming increasingly irritated with the computer. He slaps the monitor and pounds on the keyboard with his fist before picking up his keyboard and using it like a bat to knock the monitor off of the desk. His neighbor peers over the partition twice in curiosity. The video ends with the protagonist kicking the monitor out of his cubicle.

== Production and spread ==
The video clip was staged and produced by Durango, Colorado-based Loronix Information Systems to demonstrate the benefits of their digital video surveillance system for release on a promotional CD. The video is an example of a potential use for the surveillance system. The video's subject is Vinny Licciardi, the company's shipping manager. Licciardi appeared in a series of promotional videos extolling the benefits of Loronix's special brand of digital video recording systems. Loronix was the first company to develop a digital video surveillance system to replace video tape recorders. As of 2008, Loronix is a subsidiary of Verint Systems.

Bad Day has circulated online since at least 1997. It made its largest impression via email, where its reasonable size made distribution easy. The origin was revealed in 1998 originally by CNN and later in print by Security Distribution Magazine. The company first heard of the video's popularity in June 1998. Its popularity within the company created internal computer issues.

== Legacy ==
According to user interaction expert Frank Thissen, though fictional, it provides an example of how user expectations from longstanding social conventions can be frustrated through poor programming. In the Bad Day scenario, "The expectations of the user are obviously badly neglected", and the computer's lack of reaction or poor reaction is understood in the context of a human social situation, such as when someone walks away in the middle of a conversation. Wired's Michelle Delio called the protagonist "the patron saint of computer bashers".

Follow-ups to the video were featured on TechTV promos, where the same man is videotaped throwing the computer down a flight of stairs, and later running it over with his car. A 2005 spoof was produced by GoViral for the network security firm NetOp, showing a computer fighting back. The video is also frequently used in Angry German Kid parodies, with the office worker in the video often being portrayed as Leopold's dad, and is given the name "Harold Slikk".

== See also ==
- Angry German Kid, a 2006 viral video about a German boy who is breaking his keyboard
