= Nomophobia =

Fear of not having a mobile phone

Nomophobia (short for "no mobile phobia") is the fear of not having a working mobile phone. It has been considered a symptom of problematic digital media use in mental health, the definitions of which are not standardized for technical and genetic reasons.

Prior to the 2008 re-coining of the above neologism as a portmanteau, the term "nomophobia" was coined in 1803 as a standard neoclassical compound word defined as aversion to or fear of laws or rules according to the Oxford English Dictionary.

== Overview ==
Nomophobia is usually considered a behavioral addiction, and shares characteristics with drug addiction. The connection of mobile phones to the Internet is one of the causes of nomophobia. The symptoms of addiction may be the result of a need for comfort due to factors such as increased anxiety, poor self-esteem, insecure attachment, or emotional instability. Some people overuse mobile phones to gain comfort in emotional relationships.

Although nomophobia does not appear in the current Diagnostic and Statistical Manual of Mental Disorders, Fifth Edition (DSM-5), it has been proposed as a "specific phobia", based on definitions given in the DSM-IV. According to Bianchi and Philips (2005) psychological factors are involved in the overuse of a mobile phone. These could include low self-esteem (when individuals looking for reassurance use the mobile phone in inappropriate ways) and extroverted personality (when naturally social individuals use the mobile phone to excess). It is also highly possible that nomophobic symptoms may be caused by other underlying and preexisting mental disorders, with likely candidates including social phobia or social anxiety disorder, social anxiety, and panic disorder.

== History ==
The term "nomophobia" comes from "no mobile phone phobia" and was first used in a 2008 study done by the United Kingdom's Post Office. The study was run by the organization YouGov, which surveyed over 2,000 mobile phone users and found that about 53% of them experienced anxiety when they lost their phone, ran out of battery, or had no service. This idea got more attention in the 2010s because smartphone use became more common and essential to everyday life, especially among younger users.

Since then, nomophobia has shown up in studies about psychology and society as a modern kind of anxiety that is tied to phone usage. Although it is not officially a clinical disorder in manuals like the DSM-5 or ICD-11, nomophobia is now studied and looked at along with other addictions and is also looked at with conditions like smartphone use issues and internet addictions.

Researchers keep studying how being away from phones affects people emotionally and socially, especially teens and college students. Some studies even link nomophobia to stress, anxiety, and sleep problems.

== Research evidence ==
With the changes of technologies, new challenges are coming up on a daily basis. New kinds of phobias have emerged (the so-called techno-phobias). Since the first mobile phone was introduced to the consumer market in 1983, these devices have become significantly mainstream in the majority of societies.

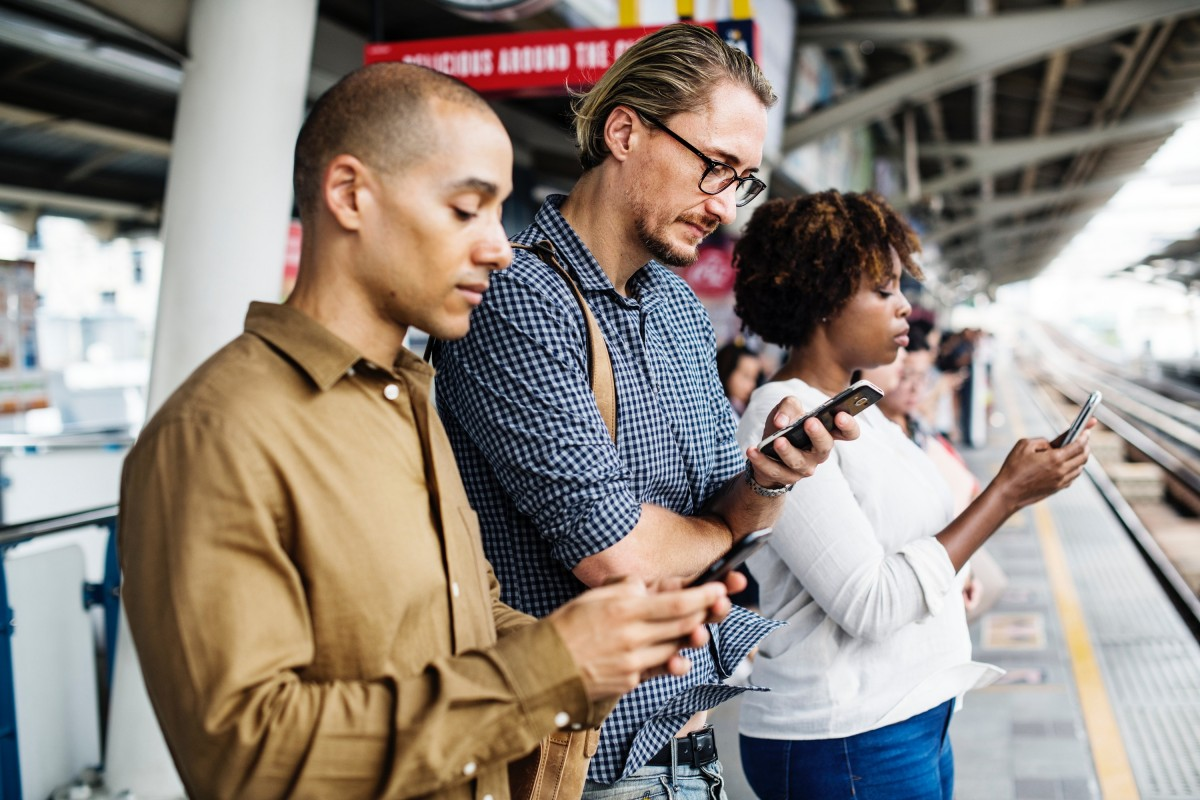
Smartphones have become ubiquitous throughout many societies.

Shambare, Rugimbana & Zhowa (2012) claimed that cell phones are "possibly the biggest non-drug addiction of the 21st century", and that college students may spend up to nine hours every day on their phones, which can lead to dependence on such technologies as a driver of modern life and an example of "a paradox of technology" that is both freeing and enslaving.

A survey conducted by SecurEnvoy showed that young adults and adolescents are more likely to have nomophobia. The same survey reported that 77% of the teens reported anxiety and worries when they were without their mobile phones, followed by the 25-34 age group and people over 55 years old. Some psychological predictors to look for in a person who might have this phobia are "self negative views, younger age, low esteem and self-efficacy, high extroversion or introversion, impulsiveness and sense of urgency and sensation seeking".

Among students, frequent cell phone usage has been correlated with decreases in grade point average (GPA) and increased anxiety that negatively impacts self-reported life satisfaction (well-being and happiness) in comparison to students with less frequent usage. GPA decreases may be due to the over-use of cell phone or computer usage consuming time and focus during studying, attending class, working on assignments, and the distraction of cell phones during class. Over-usage of cell phones may increase anxiety due to the pressure to be continually connected to social networks and could rob chances of perceived solitude, relieving daily stress, that has been linked as a component of well-being. People can use mobile phones to connect with friends and family, to obtain interpersonal needs such as family affection and tolerance. Mobile phones can also allow users to get support and accompany on the Internet. People indeed use mobile phones to regulate emotions, and as a powerful tool for cyber-psychology, mobile phones are connected to people's emotional life.

=== Other experiments ===
Research suggests that mobile phone use is negatively associated with satisfaction with life. Although mobile phones can make life easier, they are also regarded as stressors. Reasons such as high work pressure, frequent interpersonal communication, rapid information update and circulation, these reasons make mobile phones crucial tools for most people in their work and life. If a mobile phone is dead or a sudden drop in notification frequency occurs, some people will experience anxiety, irritability, depression, and other symptoms. The study shows that a wider range of mobile phone use is usually due to lower happiness, mindfulness, and life satisfaction.

In Australia, 946 adolescents and emerging adults between ages 15 and 24 participated in a mobile phone research study (387 males, 457 females, and 102 chose not to report a gender). The study focused on the relationship between the participants' frequency of mobile phone use and psychological involvement with their mobile phone. Researchers assessed several psychological factors that might influence participants' mobile phone use with the following questionnaires: Mobile Phone Involvement Questionnaire (MPIQ), Frequency of Mobile Phone Use, Self Identity, and Validation from others. The MPIQ assessed behavioral addictions using a seven-point Likert scale (1 – strongly agree) and (7 – strongly disagree) that included statements such as: "I often think about my mobile phone when I am not using it... ... I feel connected to others when I use my mobile phone."

The results demonstrated moderate difference between the participants' mobile phone use and their psychological relationships with the mobile phones. No pathological conditions were found, but there was an excessive use of mobile phone indicating signs of attachment. Participants who demonstrated signs of excessive mobile phone use were more likely to increase their use when receiving validation from others. Other factors considered, the population studied was focused on adolescents and emerging adults are more likely to develop mobile phone dependency because they may be going through a self-identity, self-esteem, and social identity.

Those with panic disorders and anxiety disorders are prone to mobile phone dependency. A study in Brazil compared the symptoms experienced due to mobile phone use by heterosexual participants with panic disorders and a control group of healthy participants. Group 1 consisted of 50 participants with panic disorder and agoraphobia with an average age of 43, and group 2 consisted of 70 healthy participants with no disorders and an average age of 35. During the experiment participants were given a self-report mobile phone questionnaire which assessed the mobile phone use and symptoms reported by both groups.

About 44% of group 1 reported that they felt "secure" when they had their mobile phones versus 46% of group 2 reported they would not feel the same without their mobile phone. The results demonstrated that 68% of all participants reported mobile phone dependency, but overall the participants with panic disorder and agoraphobia reported significantly more emotional symptoms and dependency on mobile phones when compared to the control group when access to the mobile phone was prohibited.

== Symptoms and signs ==
Individuals who experience nomophobia typically report feelings of stress and nervousness, including but not limited to feelings of shakiness, irritability, inability to focus, or urges to check their phone repeatedly. Additionally, certain individuals reported feeling lost, uncomfortable, or panicky in the event of their phone dying, getting lost, or losing signal.

Furthermore, nomophobia manifests in physical behaviors as well. For example, people may keep their phones nearby even during sleep, experience phantom notifications, or avoid situations where phone use is restricted, such as flights or exams. For some people, especially in more extreme cases, the stress can feel a lot like anxiety. They might sweat, breathe fast, or even feel sick if they don't have their phone nearby.

This stuff tends to hit harder for teens and young adults, who usually rely on their phones more for things such as texting, social media, and staying connected with people.

Nomophobia occurs in situations when an individual experiences anxiety due to the fear of not having access to a mobile phone. The "over-connection syndrome" occurs when mobile phone use reduces the amount of face-to-face interactions thereby interfering significantly with an individual's social and family interactions. The term "techno-stress" is another way to describe an individual who avoids face-to-face interactions by engaging in isolation including psychological mood disorders such as depression.

Anxiety is provoked by several factors, such as the loss of a mobile phone, loss of reception, and a dead mobile phone battery. Some clinical characteristics of nomophobia include using the device impulsively, as a protection from social communication, or as a transitional object. Observed behaviors include having one or more devices with access to internet, always carrying a charger, and experiencing feelings of anxiety when thinking about losing the mobile. People usually reduce sleep when they overuse their mobile phones. Lack of sleep can lead to depression and lack of care, which makes people willing to indulge in mobile phones. Research shows that the dependence on mobile phones is due to adverse mental health. Compared to other people, their sleep time will be shorter, the longer they use the phone, the more severe their depression. The increase in mobile phone usage is related to the decline in self-esteem and coping ability.

Irrational reactions and extreme reactions due to anxiety and stress may be experienced by the individual in public settings where mobile phone use is restricted, such as in airports, academic institutions, hospitals and work. Overusing a mobile phone for day-to-day activities such as purchasing items can cause the individual financial problems. Signs of distress and depression occur when the individual does not receive any contact through a mobile phone. Attachment signs of a mobile phone also include the urge to sleep with a mobile phone. The ability to communicate through a mobile phone gives the individual peace of mind and security.

Nomophobia may act as a proxy to other disorders. Those with an underlying social disorder are likely to experience nervousness, anxiety, anguish, perspiration, and trembling when separated or unable to use their digital devices due to low battery, out of service area, no connection, etc. Such people will often insist on keeping their devices on hand at all times, typically returning to their homes to retrieve forgotten cell phones.

Nomophobic behavior may reinforce social anxiety tendencies and dependency on using virtual and digital communications as a method of reducing stress generated by social anxiety and social phobia. Those with panic disorders may also show nomophobic behavior, however, they will probably report feelings of rejection, loneliness, insecurity, and low self-esteem in regard to their cell phones, especially when times with little to no contact (few incoming calls and messages). Those with panic disorder will probably feel significantly more anxious and depressed with their cellphone use. Despite this, those with panic disorder were significantly less likely to place voice calls.

Nomophobia has also been shown to increase the likelihood of problematic mobile phone use such as dependent use (i.e. never turning the device off), prohibited use (i.e. use in any environment where it is forbidden to do so), and dangerous use (i.e. use while driving or crossing a road). Additionally, nomophobia's third factor—the fear of not being able to access information—has the greatest impact on the likelihood of engaging in illegal use while driving.

=== Symptoms ===
- anxiety
- respiratory alterations
- trembling
- perspiration
- agitation
- disorientation
- tachycardia

=== Emotional symptoms ===
- depression
- panic
- fear
- dependence
- rejection
- low self-esteem
- loneliness

== Causes ==
Nomophobia is thought to occur because phones have become a central part of everyday life. Mobile phones are relied upon for talking to friends, browsing online, or feeling more secure. Given that people are always connected, some start to feel like they need their phone all the time. Wanting to stay updated, getting likes, or fear of missing out are thought to make nomophobia worse.

Researchers have found that nomophobia can present similarly to an addiction. When people reach for their phones out of habit, especially when they are bored or stressed. A number of apps are made to keep a user hooked with nonstop notifications, scrolling, and fast reactions that light up the reward system in the user's brain.

Age and culture also matter. Young people, especially teens and college students, grew up with phones and the internet, so it is normal for them to feel weird or uncomfortable without their devices.

== Treatments ==
Even though nomophobia is not officially listed as a mental health disorder, experts still have ideas on how to deal with it. One of the top ways is Cognitive Behavioral Therapy (CBT), which helps people notice and change the thoughts that make them panic when they are away from their phone.

Another option is doing a digital detox like cutting down screen time, setting rules like "no phones at dinner," or using apps that track how much one uses one's phone. Some people find it helpful to replace screen time with things like sports, reading, or just hanging out with friends in person.

Schools and clinics have started running workshops or campaigns to teach people, especially students, about phone habits and how to improve them. More research is needed, but early signs show these strategies can help with the anxiety that comes from not having a working phone.

Currently, scholarly accepted and empirically proven treatments are very limited due to its relatively new concept. However, promising treatments include cognitive-behavioral psychotherapy, EMDR, and combined with pharmacological interventions. Part of the treatment solution could involve increasing the availability of mobile phone charging stations to address aspects of nomophobia related to battery anxiety, enhancing individuals' sense of security about their device's power status. Treatments using tranylcypromine and clonazepam were successful in reducing the effects of nomophobia.

Cognitive behavioral therapy seems to be effective by reinforcing autonomous behavior independent from technological influences, however, this form of treatment lacks randomized trials. Another possible treatment is "Reality Approach," or Reality therapy asking patient to focus behaviors away from cell phones. In extreme or severe cases, neuropsychopharmacology may be advantageous, ranging from benzodiazepines to antidepressants in usual doses. Patients were also successfully treated using tranylcypromine combined with clonazepam. However, these medications were designed to treat social anxiety disorder and not nomophobia directly. It may be rather difficult to treat nomophobia directly, but more plausible to investigate, identify, and treat any underlying mental disorders if any exist.

Even though nomophobia is a fairly new concept, there are validated psychometric scales available to help in the diagnostic, an example of one of these scales is the "Questionnaire of Dependence of Mobile Phone/Test of Mobile Phone Dependence (QDMP/TMPD)".

== Criticism ==
Even though the term nomophobia pops up a lot in the news and some research, not everyone agrees that it's a real disorder. Some experts say it shouldn't be treated like a standalone mental health issue since it's not recognized in official books like the DSM-5 or ICD-11.

Others think that what we call nomophobia might actually just be part of bigger issues, like general anxiety or smartphone overuse. Some worry that turning everyday phone habits into a "disorder" could make normal behavior seem like a problem especially for young people who use their phones for school and social life.

On Wikipedia's talk page, there is even a debate about whether this article should exist at all. A few editors think it should be merged with other topics like smartphone addiction or internet addiction. People who support the term say it is useful for understanding the unique kind of stress that comes from being disconnected in today's digital world.

== See also ==
- Problematic smartphone use
- Screen time
- Fear of missing out
- Digital media use and mental health
- Autophobia, fear of being alone
- Internet addiction disorder
- Technostress
- Telephone phobia
- De Quervain syndrome
