= Zoom fatigue =

Burnout associated with overuse of virtual platforms

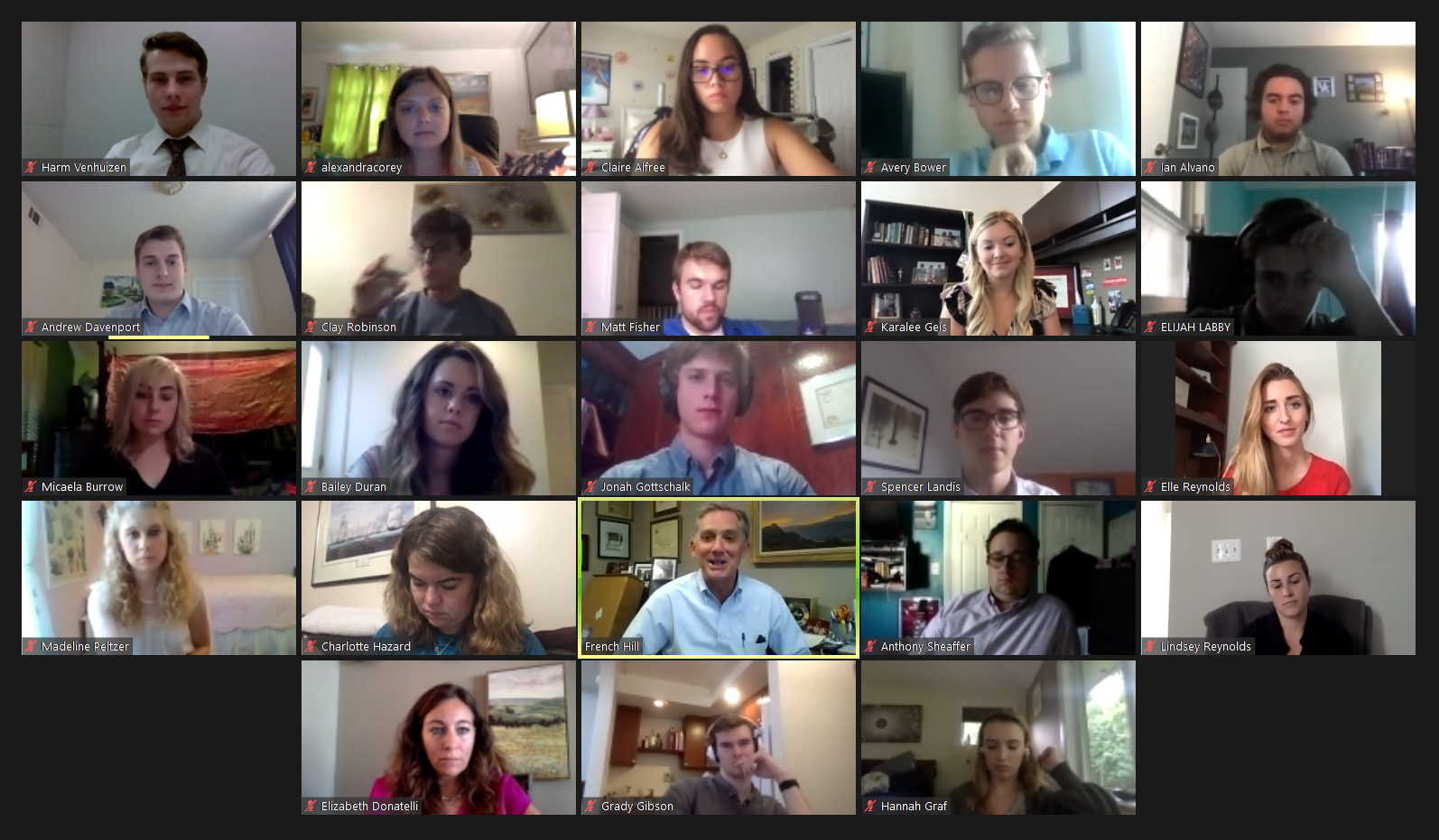
A Zoom teleconferencing call

Zoom fatigue is tiredness, worry, or burnout associated with the overuse of online platforms of communication, particularly videotelephony. Its name derives from the cloud-based videoconferencing and online chat software Zoom, but the term can be used to refer to fatigue from any videoconferencing platform (such as Google Meet or Microsoft Teams).

The term was popularized during the COVID-19 pandemic, during which the use of videoconferencing software became common due to the effects of isolation and widespread lockdowns.

The phenomenon of Zoom fatigue has been attributed to an overload of nonverbal cues and communication that are not normally present in face-to-face conversations, and the increased average size of groups in video calls.

== Symptoms ==
=== Physical ===
Although remote work was widespread in the software service and information technology sectors, the COVID-19 pandemic forced more than 85% of people working in traditionally in-person industries to temporarily change to a remote work environment. These disruptions in working habits opened up challenges within many households, such as a lack of dedicated workspaces.

Zoom fatigue's primary physical effects are typically limited to the eyes, shoulders, joints, and the cervical spine. Common symptoms include: headaches, migraines, eye irritation and pain, blurred and double vision, and excessive tearing and blinking. Besides physical, Zoom fatigue also has several mental effects, which, despite often being less evident, can be more problematic, as they can carry long-term implications for the body, while being more difficult to diagnose. Some of these mental symptoms include: decreased attention, sleep disorders, depression, depletion of mental or physical capacity and inertia.

A study by the Institute for Employment Studies (IES) conducted during the first two weeks of the COVID-19 lockdowns found that more than half of survey respondents reported higher levels of aches and pains compared with previous baselines, especially in the neck (58%), shoulder (56%) and back (55%). The study also found that poor sleep and increased risk of exhaustion were also causes of concern. The majority of respondents reported a loss of sleep due to worry (64%) and correspondingly, increased symptoms of fatigue (60%), which the IES attributed to be "possibly a consequence of nearly half (48%) reporting working patterns that include long and irregular hours". Besides those mentioned above, an increase in alcohol consumption and a decrease in healthy and adequate diets was also reported.

A survey of over one thousand Americans in November 2020 found that 72% of the people were working from their bed, a habit which triggered health problems, with reported symptoms including headaches, back stiffness, arthritis.

=== Psychological ===
In video calls, group engagement occurs without the participants' physical presence, triggering a form of constant dissonance that can lead to exhaustion. Some sources allege that the apparent presence of enlarged human faces within one's private spaces can trigger threat responses by the brain.

=== Contextual ===
Contextual stressors also exist that are caused by Zoom fatigue. The inability to cope with new (and often highly intrusive) technologies, called technostress, alongside global differences in the access and use of these technologies (caused by wage inequality) that were exacerbated by the COVID-19 pandemic, described in the digital divide theory, both contribute to reduce concentration and reduce rates of cognitive energy during online live sessions.

=== Emotional ===
Emotional consequences of Zoom fatigue are fundamental to consider as they have great importance in an individual's approach to social relations and the work environment:

- Emotional exhaustion: a chronic state of emotional depletion. Emotional energy use is higher during a Zoom call, as such, people are unable to recover and re-charge in their free time, thus leading to chronic exhaustion.
- Depletion: a temporary reduction in the available energy for self-control.
- Tech invasion: the intrusion of technology into every aspect of life that, generating the feeling to be constantly connected, provokes discomfort in individuals.

== Shift to digital consumption ==
Prior to the COVID-19 pandemic, digital communication methods had already become increasingly prevalent alongside traditional face-to-face interactions, however, the implementation of lockdown measures and restrictions on social gatherings dramatically accelerated the shift toward digital platforms, propelling them to the forefront of everyday communication. As a result, institutions and individuals were forced to rapidly adapt to virtual interactions, leading to a significant increase in the use of videoconferencing platforms.

=== Increased usage of videoconferencing platforms ===
As virtual interactions became essential during the COVID-19 pandemic, Zoom and other video conferencing platforms experienced rapid growth. Zoom, which had 10 million daily meeting participants in December 2019, reported 300 million by April 2020. Microsoft Teams reached 75 million daily active users in April 2020, a 70% increase in a month, and recorded over 200 million meeting participants in a single day. Google Meet added approximately 3 million new users daily during the same period and surpassed 100 million daily meeting participants. Cisco Webex also reported 300 million users and nearly 240,000 sign-ups within a 24-hour period in April 2020.

=== Increased multifunctionality of videoconferencing platforms ===
Traditionally, video conferencing platforms were used primarily for business calls and maintaining personal connections with family and friends; however, during the COVID-19 crisis, the availability of diverse device and software solutions led to a rise in creative use cases of these platforms. Video calls enhanced the sense of togetherness by facilitating the sharing of daily routines. For example, couples often left video calls active while engaging in separate activities, allowing for occasional interaction, while children used the medium to "show and tell" to distant relatives, as communication through video calls was considered more natural than voice or text alone.

Families and friends started celebrating holidays online, such as Easter and the Passover Seder; additionally, they participated in other activities such as watching movies, playing games or celebrating birthdays. Some physically oriented activities related to social life or personal interests have also become virtual, such as holding church services or yoga classes in an online format.

Individuals also actively joined webinars to access psychological support, as well as career and health counseling as a way of coping with the challenges posed by the pandemic.

== State of research ==
The growing public concern about causes and consequences of Zoom fatigue during the COVID-19 pandemic is reflected in intensive media reporting. At the same time, researchers have started to investigate the phenomenon of Zoom fatigue by suggesting underlying psychological mechanisms, developing measures such as the "Zoom Exhaustion & Fatigue Scale" and conducting empirical studies.

== See also ==
- COVID-19
- Web conferencing
- Proximity chat
