= Telephone phobia =

Fear of making or taking phone calls

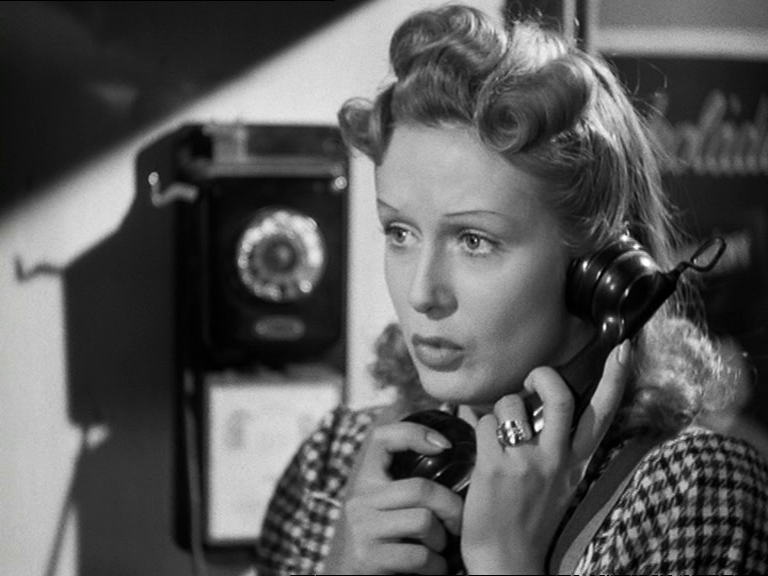
- Anxiety caused by a phone call
- Specialty: Psychology

Telephone phobia (telephonophobia, telephobia, phone phobia) is reluctance or fear of making or taking phone calls, literally, "fear of telephones". It is considered to be a type of social phobia or social anxiety. It may be compared to glossophobia, in that both arise from having to engage with an audience, and the associated fear of being criticized, judged or made a fool of.

As is common with other fears and phobias, there is a wide spectrum of severity of the fear of phone conversations and corresponding difficulties. In 1993, it was reported that about 2.5 million people in Great Britain had telephone phobia. A 2019 survey of UK office workers found that 40% of baby boomers and 70% of millennials experience anxious thoughts when the phone rings.

The term "telephone apprehension" refers to a lower degree of telephone phobia, in which sufferers experience anxiety about the use of telephones, but to a less severe degree than that of an actual phobia.

Sufferers may have no problem communicating face to face, but have difficulty doing so over the telephone.

== Causes ==
A fear of receiving calls may range from fear of the action or thought of answering the phone to fear of its actual ringing. The ringing can generate a string of anxieties, characterized by thoughts associated with having to speak, perform and converse. Sufferers may perceive the other end as threatening or intimidating. Anxiety may be triggered by concerns that the caller may bear bad or upsetting news, or be a prank caller.

Fear of making calls may be associated with concerns about finding an appropriate time to call, in fear of being a nuisance. A sufferer calling a household or office in which they know several people may be concerned at the prospect of failing to recognize the voice of the person who answers, with resultant embarrassment. Some sufferers may be anxious about having to "perform" in front of a real or perceived audience at their end of the line: this is a particular problem for those required to use a phone in the workplace.

Fear of using the phone in any context (for either making or receiving calls) may be associated with anxiety about poor sound quality, and concerns that one or other party will not understand what has been said, resulting either in misunderstandings, or in the need for repetition, further explanation, or other potentially awkward forms of negotiation. These fears are often linked to the absence of body language over a phone line, and the individual fearing a loss of their sense of control. The fact that the conversation is of limited duration may also add to the sense of pressure: sufferers typically report fear that they might fail to respond appropriately, or find themselves with nothing to say, leading to embarrassing silence or stuttering. Past experiences, such as receiving traumatic news, or enduring an unpleasant and angry call, may also play a part in creating fear.

== Symptoms ==
A variety of symptoms can be seen in someone suffering from telephone phobia, many of which are shared with anxiety. These symptoms may include nervous stomach, sweaty palms, rapid heartbeat, shortness of breath, nausea, dry mouth and trembling. The sufferer may experience feelings of panic, terror and dread. Resulting panic attacks can include hyperventilation and stress. These negative and agitating symptoms can be produced by both the thought of making and receiving calls and the action of doing so.

== Effects ==
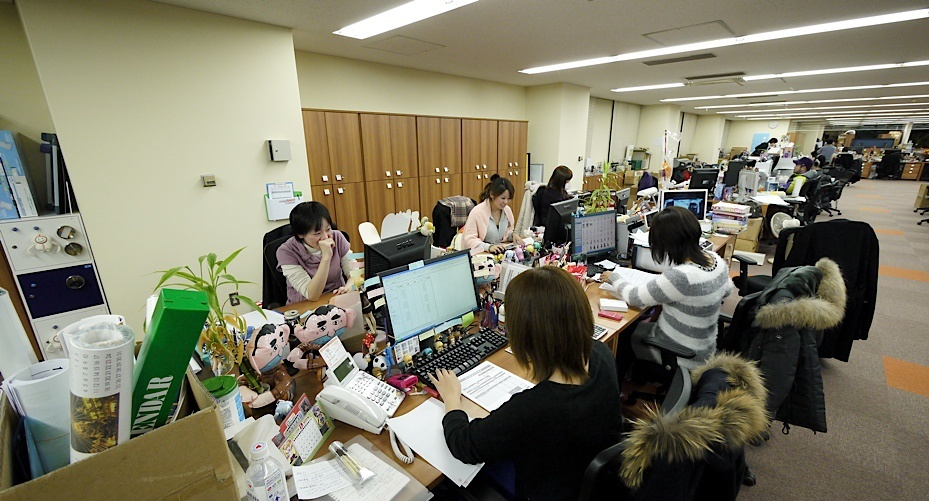
Open-plan offices, in which phone conversations may be readily overheard by co-workers, pose particular challenges for sufferers from telephone phobia

The telephone is important for both contacting others and accessing important and useful services. As a result, this phobia causes a great deal of stress and impacts people's personal lives, work lives and social lives. Sufferers avoid many activities, such as scheduling events or clarifying information. Strain is created in the workplace because use of phones may play a crucial role within a career.

== Coping and avoidance strategies ==
Coping strategies may consist of planning the conversation ahead of time and rehearsing, writing or noting down what needs to be said. Anxiety may be lessened by having privacy in which to make a call, so that the sufferer need not be concerned about the conversation being overheard.

Associated avoidance behaviour may include asking others (e.g. relatives at home) to take phone calls and exclusively using answering machines. The rise in the use of electronic text-based communication (the Internet, email and text messaging) has given many sufferers alternative means of communication that they may find considerably less stressful than the phone. At the same time, members of a younger generation who have grown up with digital communication increasingly find both making or receiving phone calls "intrusive", preferring to use media that allow them to "participate in the conversation at the pace [they] choose". In the 2019 survey, 61% of UK millennial office workers reported that they would "display physical, anxiety-induced behaviours when they're the only ones in the office and the phone rings". A 2024 survey in the UK found that one quarter of respondents aged 18–34 admitted that they had never answered a call to their mobile phone. A spokesperson for price comparison service Uswitch, who conducted the survey, commented "Gen Z and younger millennials increasingly prefer 'low pressure' voice notes, which signal there is less urgency to respond."

Sufferers may find it helpful to explain the nature of the phobia to friends, so that a failure to respond to messages is not misinterpreted as rudeness or an unwillingness to communicate.

== Treatment ==
Phobias of this sort can usually be treated by different types of therapies, including: cognitive behavioral therapy (CBT), psychotherapy, behavior therapy and exposure therapy.

Practice may play an important part in overcoming fear. It may be helpful to sufferers to increase phone usage at a slow pace, starting with simple calls and gradually working their way up. For example, they may find it easier to start with automated calls, move on to conversations with family and friends, and then further extend both the length of conversations and the range of people with whom conversations are held.

== See also ==
- List of phobias
- Nomophobia
