= Focus TV =

German television production company

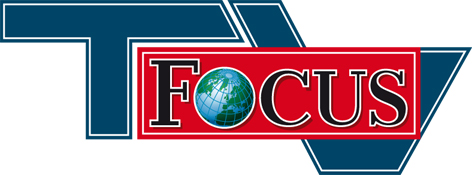
- Type: GmbH
- Industry: Media
- Founded: 1995
- Headquarters: Munich
- Website: Focus TV

The Focus TV Productions GmbH is a German TV production company headquartered in Munich. It is a subsidiary of Focus Magazine Publishing, a Hubert Burda Media company, and was founded in 1995.

Focus TV produces, among others, magazine programs, reports, documentaries, talk shows and documentary soap operas for German television, as well as corporate and industrial films for companies.

== Criticism ==
The editorial staff of Focus TV came under fire for a report on the supposed dangers of so-called killer games, which contained footage of a young person allegedly addicted to computer games. However, this video, the content of which is fictitious, had been produced by the protagonist, who consequently became known as the Angry German Kid, and posted on the Internet for entertainment purposes. As a result of the dissemination of the footage, which Focus TV presented as authentic, the person concerned was, according to his own statements, subjected to harassment by his fellow students for several years and initially also failed to find a training position.
