= Kent Norman =

American cognitive psychologist

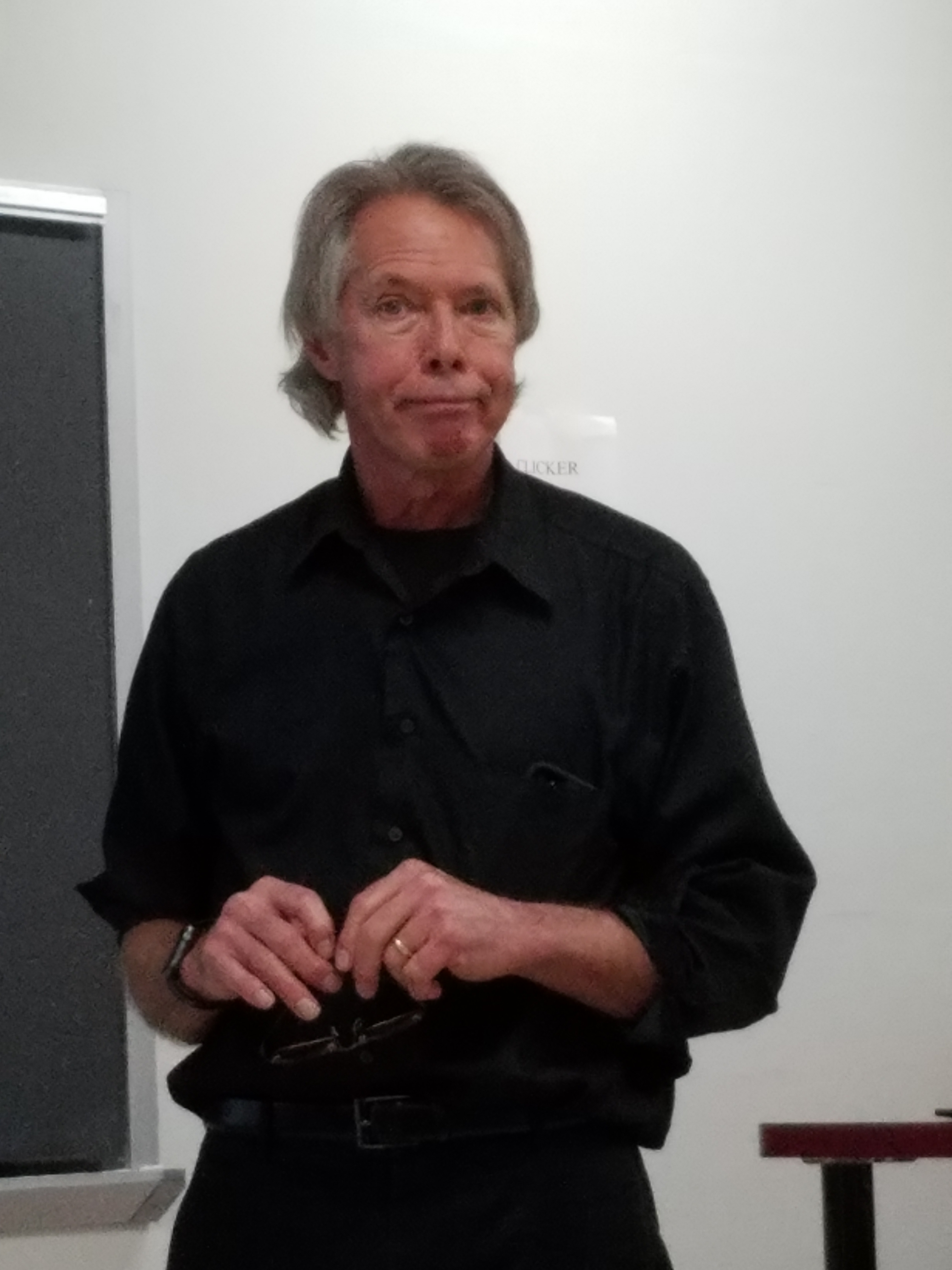
- Dr. Kent L. Norman teaching a class at the University of Maryland, on February 24, 2017.
- Born: March 8, 1947
- Occupations: Psychologist, author, cognitive scientist, university teacher
- Employer: University of Maryland (1975–2018)
- Notable work: Cyberpsychology : an introduction to human-computer interaction, Learning a menu selection tree: training methods compared

Kent L. Norman is an American cognitive psychologist and an expert on computer rage. He graduated from Southern Methodist University in 1969 and earned a Ph.D. in experimental psychology from the University of Iowa in 1973.

Norman was an associate professor of Psychology at the University of Maryland, College Park. He retired January 2018.

In 1983, Norman co-founded the Laboratory for Automation Psychology and Decision Processes (LAPDP) as an affiliate of the Human-Computer Interaction Laboratory (HCIL) and the University of Maryland Institute for Advanced Computer Studies (UMIACS). The LAPDP studies the cognitive side of the human/computer interface, with an emphasis on the processes of judgment and decision making.

Norman designed and wrote the HyperCourseware software system, in 1990, for the preparation and presentation of materials and the processes of education in a virtual learning environment. HyperCourseware has been used in the multimedia Teaching Theaters at the University of Maryland, College Park.

In 1997, Norman worked with the Center for the Design of Distance Education Methodology at the Open University of Israel and collaborated on new methods of Internet distance education.

== Books written ==
- Norman, K. L. (1991). The psychology of menu selection: Designing cognitive control at the human/computer interface. Norwood, N.J.: Ablex Publishing Corporation.
- Norman, K. L. (1997). Teaching in the switched-on classroom: An introduction to electronic education and HyperCourseware. College Park, MD: Laboratory for Automation Psychology. (http://www.lap.umd.edu/SOC/)
- Norman, Kent L. (July 2008). Cyberpsychology: An Introduction to Human-Computer Interaction (1st ed.). Cambridge University Press. ISBN 978-0-521-68702-7.
- Norman, Kent L. (March 2017). Cyberpsychology: An Introduction to Human-Computer Interaction (print book; e-book) (2nd ed.). Cambridge; New York, NY: Oxford University Press. doi:10.1017/9781316212554. ISBN 978-1-107-10254-5. LCCN 2016049413. OCLC 982087091. OL 4438684W.

== Teaching ==
Norman is a retired Associate Professor of Psychology, University of Maryland, College Park and lead scientist of the LAPDP. He teaches courses on cyberpsychology, human-computer interaction, the psychology of video games, and the psychology of social networks and social computing.

== See also ==
- Computer rage
