= Laboratory for Automation Psychology =

US research laboratory

Coordinates: 38°59′20.0″N 76°56′33.6″W

The Laboratory for Automation Psychology (LAP) (also Laboratory for Automation Psychology and Decision Processes or LAPDP) was founded in 1983 by Kent Norman and Nancy Anderson as an affiliate of the University of Maryland Human–Computer Interaction Lab at the University of Maryland Institute for Advanced Computer Studies (UMIACS).

It was housed in the University of Maryland, College Park's Department of Psychology and was devoted to the study of the cognitive side of the human/computer interface with an emphasis on the processes of judgment and decision making. Research has covered a wide range of topics from menu selection to direct manipulation and from user satisfaction to computer rage. Around 2006, research focus changed to psychological aspects of video games including factors of attraction and immersion, violent acts in video games, and skill sets required by different genre of video games.

Facilities included usability testing stations with dual monitor computers and video cameras as well as web servers hosting experimental materials and providing data collection.

Main workspace in the LAPDP, July, 1999

The full range of video game consoles were added including the Sony PlayStation, Nintendo Wii, and Xbox.

Video game playing in LAPDP, March, 2008

Research in the LAP has been supported by corporations such as AT&T, Sperry, and IBM and by U.S. federal agencies such as NASA, NSF, NRL, and the U.S. Census Bureau.
