= The Word and the World =

The Word and the World Project of the Stanford University's Learning Lab developed a large lecture, Introduction to Humanities (IHUM) course adopting pedagogical strategies and technologies designed to enhance learning. The course was given in 1997 and 1998. The goal of the curriculum innovations was to transform a large lecture course into a learning community. Professors: Larry Friedlander (English), Haun Saussy (East Asian Studies), and Tim Lenior (History); teaching fellows: Carlos Seligo and Margo Denman and lab staff: Charles Kerns and George Toye worked together to develop a holistic curriculum mediated through a website center for the course.

== Problems in large lecture courses ==
This course was developed in response to the shortcomings of earlier large lecture courses. This type of course typically rated poorly in student evaluations and often led students to behaviors that inhibited learning: students skipped lectures and did not read assignments or prepare for meetings; students crammed for exams and waited until the last minute to write papers with a focus on grades and not learning. They were passive participants in a system that did not foster active engagement. Often there was a lack of continuity between lecture and section. Students had widely varying levels of knowledge about the texts. Faculty had very little information about the students’ knowledge as the course proceeded and the students had little feedback on their performance.

== Course design ==
The curriculum was based on the reading of five texts, Genesis, Blade Runner, Hamlet, Descartes' Meditations, from the viewpoint of the scholar of history, literature, or philosophy. The course emphasized methods of reading and critical and interpretive approaches, rather than content.

This first year course met weekly in two one-hour lectures for all 100 students and two one-hour discussion section meetings of 15 students each. Students and instructors engaged in web activities including structured reading assignments and asynchronous discussion forums. The web site provided rich resources to supplement the texts. Students worked cross-section group projects and on panel discussions. There was no final exam for the course; a fair was held in which students exhibited their project web sites.

== Technology ==
- Central Course Web Site

A site that had a calendar, announcements, faculty bios, the asynchronous discussion forums, assignments, and student projects

- Rich Web Resources

The course web site linked rich resources supporting each text to engage students from novices to those well-informed on the texts. It included explanatory information, annotations, cultural information, critical analyses, visual interpretations of the texts including paintings, video recordings of multiple performances, and different cuts of the films.

- Structured Readings

The web site also had a series of on-line assignments that structured the learners’ reading activities. These on-line activities drew upon the students’ previous knowledge and guided them as they approached each text. In the first year of the project in 1997 students responses were recorded in a personal on-line, shareable portfolio, but after noting little use of the portfolio, the design was changed in the second iteration of the course in 1998 so that assignments were displayed directly in the discussion Forum.

- The Forum

The Forum had special features to support large lecture courses such as photographs of the posting student next to his/her message, organization into sections, and notification systems to alert faculty and groups to special postings. The forum was used to discuss lectures; it was where assignments were posted (they were not sent to an instructor); and was used for communication in forming project groups. The Forum was enhanced in the second year to allow direct linkage to assignments, faculty-controlled subject organization, and threaded discussion.

- Student Project Web Sites

The students in the course completed projects in the second half of the course that demonstrated their understanding of the texts. Projects were constructed in many media the first year but were limited to posters and web sites in the second. Faculty met often with students helping them to plan their projects. All projects from the previous year were available as models when the course was repeated.

- Evaluation

The project employed several modes of project and technology evaluation: questionnaires, interviews, video interaction analysis, peer review, and ethnographic studies. Findings:

-The Forum provided a venue for discussion by quiet students and accommodated different learning styles. -The Forum and assignments helped students prepare for face-to-face meetings by discussing basic issues before class. -It added to workload of teaching staff. -There was a positive correlation between scores on papers and number of Forum postings.
