= Elliott Masie =

Elliott Masie is a theatrical producer and an educational technology expert credited with coining the phrase 'E-Learning' to describe online learning.[1][2]

He is among the most well known figures in the eLearning industry and awarded the position of number 1 on eLearning Industry's movers and shakers list in 2017.[3] He is primarily known for his work in corporate learning and organizational performance.[4] He is editor of 'Learning TRENDS by Elliott Masie'[5] an online eLearning newsletter. He is also founder of the MASIE Center as well as chair of The Learning Collaborative. He is the CEO of MASIE Productions and a member of the Washington Speakers Bureau.

== Published works ==
Elliott Masie has written eleven books:

- Learning Rants, Raves, and Reflections: A Collection of Passionate and Professional Perspectives
- Computer Training Handbook
- The computer training handbook How to teach people
- Computers + Student Activities Handbook
- Using Computers in College Student Activities
- Computer Trainer's Personal Training Guide (Training Guides)
- The computer training handbook: how to teach people to use computers
- The Computer Training Handbook: Strategies for Helping People to Learn Technology
- Master Trainer Handbook: Tips, Tactics, and How-Tos for Delivering Effective Instructor-Led, Participant-Centered Training
- Big Learning Data
- The Masie Center's Learning Perspectives

== MASIE Productions ==
Elliott Masie is the CEO and lead investor in MASIE Productions. MASIE Productions started out as a conference and events company in the 1990s. Its most well known conference was 'Learning' an annual conference focusing on utilising technology within corporate training. MASIE Productions has also been involved in the production of Broadway theatre. They have been involved with a variety of productions, including:

- Just Another Day
- Here Lies Love
- Schucked
- The Prom
- The Cher Show
- American Son
- SpongeBob SquarePants
- Kinky Boots
- Allegiance
- MacBeth
- The Trip to Bountiful
- Somewhere in Time
- Chinglish
- Godspell
