= Stanford Learning Lab =

Applied Research Organisation

The Stanford Learning Lab was an applied research organization that "carried out projects to improve the quality of teaching and learning in higher education through effective application of information technologies and the sciences of learning". It was created in 1997 on the recommendation of the Stanford University President's Commission on Technology in Teaching and Learning. Professors Larry Leifer and Larry Friedlander lead a staff of researchers, technologists, educators, and teaching and learning specialists who worked with Stanford faculty to enhance learning by students in their courses. The Stanford Learning Lab completed its work in the spring of 2002 and was followed by The Stanford Center for Innovations in Learning (SCIL), which inherited core capabilities in technology development, educational program evaluation, and learning design and continued to perform research in these areas.

== Projects ==
- Human Biology Project: A multi-year collaboration with faculty in Stanford's Human Biology program to enhance teaching and learning in large lecture courses developing online problem sets (that evolved into the CourseWork Course Management System) and online policy challenges in which students debated policy issues.
- The Word and the World, A Large Lecture Intro to Humanities Course: In this multi-year project to create learning communities in a large lecture classes, a course web site presented (a)rich resources supporting the online course texts to engage students; (b) on-line assignments that structured the learners’ reading activities; and (c) an on-line asynchronous discussion system, Panfora, that allowed students to express their ideas, provide peer critique, and include the lecturing faculty in discussion. It had special features to support large lecture courses such as photographs of the posting student next to his/her message, organization into sections, and notification systems to alert faculty and groups to special postings.
- Courselets: An integrated set of instructional activities that covers a small set of extracurricular concepts.
- Cross-Disciplinary Learning: An investigation of issues that arise when an expert in one discipline needs deep knowledge from another discipline
- Global Learning Teams: A set of studies that focus on the design, development, and testing of best practices, principles, and tools to support globally distributed cross-cultural learning teams.
- I-RITE: Integrating Research Into the Teaching Environment : A program that integrates research and teaching by having Ph.D. students describe their research in brief, compelling statements understandable to novices in the field.
- Learning Careers: Hewlett General Education in Research Universities: An exploration of individual learning patterns using portfolios
- Mobile Learning: An exploration of mobile technologies and fundamental human cognitive challenges involved in learning on-the-go.
- Tomorrow's Professor SM Listserv: Twice weekly postings on academic life, preparing for the professorate, and new approaches to teaching, learning, and research.
- Wallenberg Hall Design: An innovative learning space and the future home of the Learning Lab.
- CSCL (Computer Supported Collaborative Learning) 1999: The third international conference devoted to the exploration of the roles for technology in collaborative forms of learning and teaching, was sponsored by the Learning Lab and held on Stanford campus, December 12–15, 1999.
- IE264: Global Project Coordination: A multi-site course to help students learn how to work effectively in cross-cultural, distributed teams.
- Integration of Asynchronous Discussion in IHUM courses: An expanded study of asynchronous online discussion in lecture courses.
- Learning by Design with BMW: A study of a highly successful globally distributed product development team that knows how to leverage networks of experts, coaches, communication technologies, and the value of fun.
- ME110K (Kyoto), Spring 1998: An Overseas Studies course, designed to give students cultural and interpersonal knowledge in addition to technical knowledge.
- New Century Scholars Workshop: A series of one-week summer workshops designed to help beginning engineering professors from across the United States, understand learning and teaching practices which support effective learning for all students.
- OSP (Overseas Studies Program) Winter 1999 course: An exploration of interdisciplinary, internationally distributed scholarly communities.
