= Computer rage =

Anger directed towards a computer

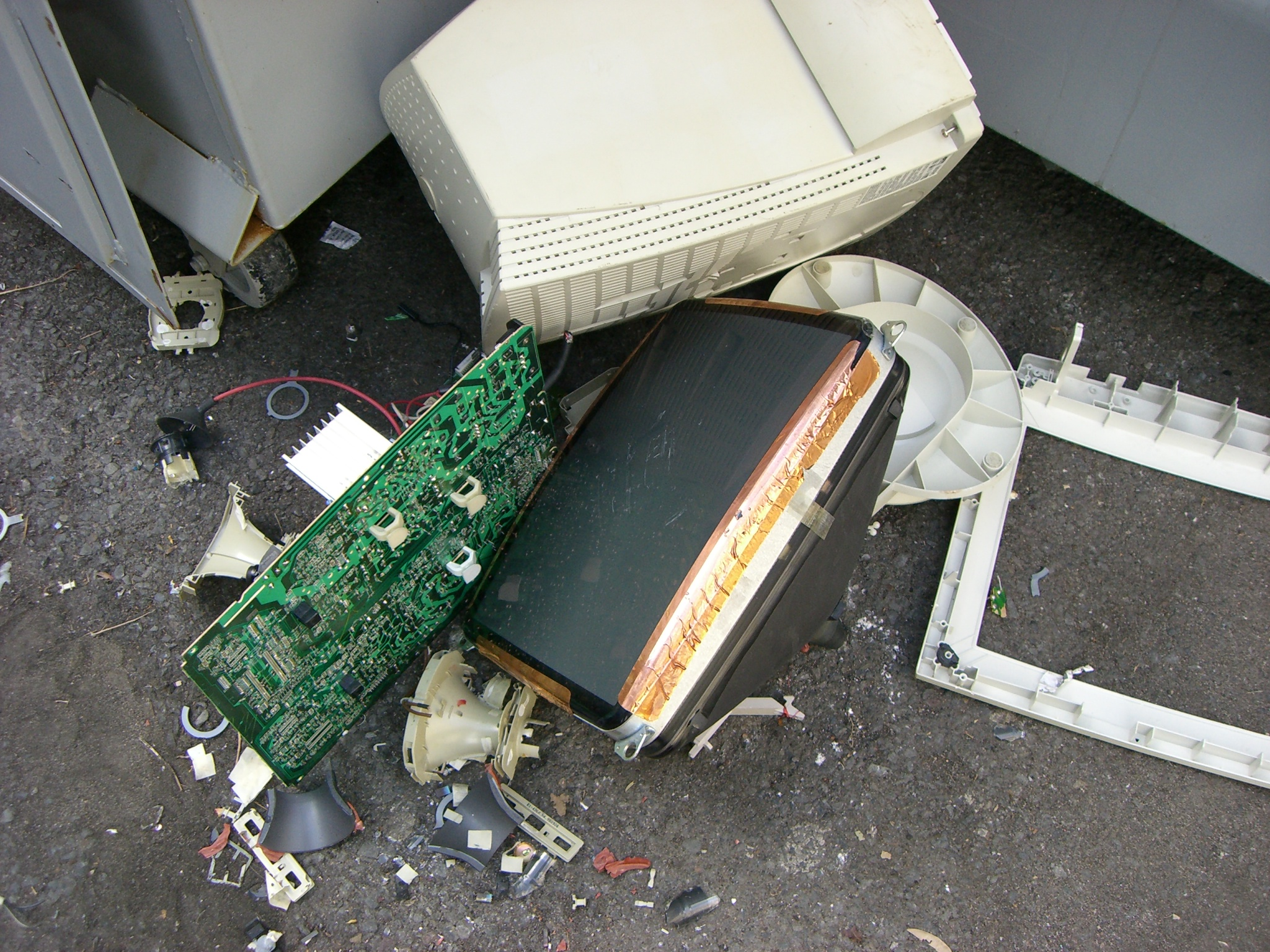
Broken computer monitor

Computer rage refers to negative psychological responses towards a computer due to heightened anger or frustration. Examples of computer rage include cursing or yelling at a computer, slamming or throwing a keyboard or a mouse, and assaulting the computer or monitor with an object or weapon.

== Prevalence ==
In 1999, it was speculated that computer rage had become more common than road rage in traffic, but in a 2015 study, it was found that reported rates of anger when using a computer were lower than reported rates of anger while driving. However, reports of anger while driving or using computers were found to be far more common than anger in other situations.

In a 2013 survey of American adults, 36% of respondents who reported experiencing computer issues, also reported that they had screamed, yelled, cursed, or physically assaulted their computers within the last six months.

In 2009, a survey was conducted with British computer users about their experiences with computers. This survey found that 54% of respondents reported verbally abusing their computers, and 40% reported that they had become physically violent toward their computers. The survey also found that most users experienced computer rage three to four times a month.

Differences in types of computer rage have also been found between different geographical regions. For example, one survey found that individuals from London have been found to be five times more likely to physically assault their computers, while those from Yorkshire and the Humber were found to be more likely to yell at their computers. Differences have also been observed for age groups, as younger adults (18–24 years old) have reported more abusive behaviors in the face of computer frustration when compared to older adults (over 35 years old). Individuals with less computer experience in particular have also been reported to experience increased feelings of anger and helplessness when it comes to computers, but other research has argued that it is the self-efficacy beliefs about computers that are predictive of computer frustration, not the amount of computer experience or use.

In 1999, Professor Robert J. Edelmann, a chartered clinical, forensic and health psychologist and a fellow of the British Psychological Society, was offering a special helpline in the UK for those with technology-related anger.

== Causes ==
=== Computer factors ===
Users can experience computer anger and frustration for a number of reasons. American adults surveyed in 2013 reported that almost half (46%) of their computer problems were due to malware or computer viruses, followed by software issues (10%) and not enough memory (8%). In another survey, users reported email, word processors, web browsing, operating system crashes, inability to locate features, and program crashes as frequent initiators of computer frustration. These technical issues, paired with tight timelines, poor work progress, and failure to complete a computer task can create heightened computer anger and frustration. When this anger and frustration exceeds a person's control, it can turn into rage.

=== Psychological factors ===
Research on emotion has shown that anger is often caused by interruptions of plans and expectations, especially through the violation of social norms. This sense of anger can be magnified when the individual does not understand why they are unable to meet their goal or task at hand or why there was a violation of social norms. Psychologists have argued that this is particularly relevant to computer rage, as computer users interact with computers in a manner similar to how they interact with other people. Thus, when computers fail to function in the face of incoming deadlines or an important task to accomplish, users can feel betrayed by the computer in the same way they can feel betrayed by other people. Specifically, when users fail to understand why their computer will not work properly, often in the times they need it to the most, it can invoke a sense of hostility as it is interpreted as a breach of social norms or a personal attack. Consistent with this finding, perceived betrayal by the computer can also elicit other negative emotions. One survey of US adults reported that 10% of users who experience computer issues experienced feeling helplessness, and 4% reported feeling victimized. In the same survey, 7% adults ages 18–34 reported that they had cried over their computer problems within the previous six months.

== Dangers and potential benefits ==
Computer rage can result in damaged property or physical injuries, as well as psychological harm. Some experts have suggested that venting frustrations on the computer may have some benefits, but other experts disagree. For example, yelling at the computer has been suggested as a way to moderate one's anger to avoid the ill effects of anger suppression, but new research has suggested that yelling can negatively affect health in itself. Alternatively, releasing anger on a computer has been viewed as advantageous as it directs this rage at an object as opposed to another person, and can make individuals feel better afterwards.

== Prevention and management ==
In response to computer issues that invoke frustration, some experts have suggested walking away from the computer for 15 minutes to "cool off". Other methods to prevent computer rage can be backing up computer data often, increasing memory of the computer, and even imagining pleasant images, such as petting an animal. Adopting a goal of improving computer knowledge may also be beneficial, as users are less likely to report computer rage when they view the issue as a challenge and not as a setback. If computer rage cannot be avoided, guidelines on how to rage with minimal consequences, such as wearing safety goggles and taking frustration out on older equipment, can be followed to reduce the likelihood of injury and significant property loss.

Employers of staff who work with computers, often in situations where time is crucial, can take steps to prevent computer rage, such as making sure there is adequate software, and providing employees with anger management strategies. Some computer technician companies have reported that, to reduce computer rage, their technicians are trained on how to work with customers in sensitive psychological states just as much as how to diagnose and fix technical issues.

Designing computer interfaces to display more emotional support when errors occur, or provide therapy strategies, has also been suggested as a way to mitigate computer anger and rage. The application of affective computing has been shown to effectively mitigate negative emotions connected to computer use. One study found that an interface that sought the user's feelings, provided empathy, and validated reported emotional states significantly reduced negative emotions associated with computer frustration for users. Another study found that when error messages contain positive wording ("Great that the computer will soon work again") compared to negative wording ("This is frustrating") or a neutral error message, users exhibited more signs of happiness.

== Notable cases ==
In April 2015, a Colorado man was cited for firing a gun within a residential area when he took his computer into a back alley and shot it eight times with a 9mm pistol. When questioned, he told police that he had become so frustrated with his computer that he had "reached critical mass," and stated that after he had shot his computer, "the angels sung on high." In 2007, a German man threw his computer out the window in the middle of the night, startling his neighbors. German police were sympathetic and did not press charges, stating, "Who hasn't felt like doing that?" In 2006, the staged surveillance video "Bad Day", showing a man assaulting his computer at work, became a viral hit on the Internet, reaching over two million views. Other instances of reported computer rage have ranged from a restaurant owner who threw his laptop into a deep fryer, to an individual who attempted to throw his computer out the window, but forgot that the window was closed.

The Angry German Kid is a popular Internet meme that stems from a viral video from the mid-2000s where the protagonist screams at his computer for loading too slowly, and repeatedly hits the table with the keyboard, causing keys to fall off.

== See also ==
- Rage (emotion)
- Air rage
- Bike rage
- Road rage
- Roid rage
- Wrap rage
- Technostress
- The Media Equation
- Debugging
- Hang (computing)
- Digital media use and mental health
