= HyperCourseware =

The home screen for HyperCourseware which acts as a navigational hub to access various modules for materials, interactions, and products.

HyperCourseware is a prototype electronic educational environment developed in 1990 by Kent Norman at the University of Maryland, College Park, to be used in an electronic classroom called the "Teaching Theater." The goal was to rehost electronically all of the things that go into education: the materials, (e.g., textbooks, maps and charts, lesson plans, etc.), the tools (e.g., the blackboard, notebooks, calculators, etc.), and the processes (e.g., lectures, discussions, question and answer, etc.).

The objective embraced by HyperCourseware has been quite broad: to provide an integrated and seamless hypermedia infrastructure to support the full range of classroom activities (Norman & Carter, 1992).

At the global level, HyperCourseware was organized around educational tools, materials, and objectives rather than around semantic or domain specific knowledge. It is only at the local or content level in the materials that knowledge structure becomes important and is incorporated into the materials by the instructor. Consequently, HyperCourseware was written to host any subject and to support many activities common across courses. These activities range from record keeping and on-line testing to hypermedia presentations and from individual exploration to group collaboration. HyperCoursware uses the conventional objects of classroom instruction and implements them in electronic form in the electronic classroom. Objects such as the course syllabus, the lesson plan, the lecture notes, the class roll, etc. are instantiated in graphic form in a hypermedia database.

Furthermore, in HyperCourseware the hypermedia database is used to provide the same sort of natural links between objects as one would expect in the educational materials themselves. For example, the syllabus is a natural navigational mechanism to jump to lectures, readings, and assignments; the classroll is a natural navigational jump to information about students and grades; and the grade list is a natural navigational jump to exams and assignments.

It was first written in a HyperCard like language called "ObjectPlus" that ran on both the Macintosh platform and Windows on a local area network. In 1998 it was rewritten for the World Wide Web using HTML on a WebStar server using FileMaker Pro databases. Currently, it is hosted by an Apple OS X Server and a FileMaker Pro database server.
