= Angry German Kid =

2006 web video

- Original title: Echter Gangster 5: PC spielen
- Directed by: Norman Kochanowski
- Starring: Norman Kochanowski
- Release dates: 14 February 2006 (slikk.de); 22 February 2006 (YouTube)
- Running time: 4 minutes
- Country: Germany
- Language: German

Angry German Kid (also known as Unreal Tournament Kid or Keyboard Crasher) is a German viral video, released on 14 February 2006. The fictionalised persona in the video, played by a German teenager named Norman Kochanowski, of Bergisches Land, Nordrhein-Westfalen, tries to play Unreal Tournament 2004 on his PC, but faces problems with it, such as the game loading slowly, which causes him to get enraged and shout, as well as smashing his keyboard in some scenes, with the video ending with Kochanowski furiously slamming the keyboard against his desk before leaving. Business Wire awarded Angry German Kid second place in the top 10 internet videos of the year in 2006, and in 2007 The Guardian ranked it as number three on its Viral Video Chart.

For a long time, the behaviour demonstrated in the video was widely believed to be genuine, but it was later revealed that the video was staged and part of a series of comedic skits. After the video was prominently featured on German television by the production company Focus TV, the video went viral online and was re-uploaded many times. The viral spread of the video resulted in its original context being lost.

== Creation and initial reception ==
Ever since he received a camcorder for his 13th birthday, Kochanowski had been experimenting with it and releasing short films under a variety of aliases, the most popular being "Leopold Slikk". At first, the videos were published in forums and video sites or exchanged on CDs. In 2006, he released a parody of rap music videos with the fictional character "Echter Gangster" (English: Real Gangster). It quickly spread to many platforms, and its success led to sequels featuring the same character. In addition to "Echter Gangster", he often calls himself "Slikk" online.

On 14 February 2006, he posted "Echter Gangster 5: PC spielen" (English: Real Gangster 5: Play PC) on slikk.de, in which he acts as a gamer who throws a tantrum because the computer game Unreal Tournament 2004 does not load fast enough. He grows furious, yells at the computer and smashes his keyboard. Even after the game loads, he still loses, causing him to furiously slam the keyboard against his desk breaking it and scream at the top of his lungs before leaving.

After its first release on 14 February 2006, the video was soon shared on other sites, including YouTube, which was first published on 22 February 2006.

== Misperception and effects on personal life ==
Many viewers were not aware that the video was a skit. After the Emsdetten school shooting in November 2006, discourse broke out in Germany about the dangers of computer games, and Focus TV distributed the video of the Angry German Kid as an example of how games could make young people aggressive. The video was distributed further, with text commentaries naming the protagonist Leopold. These commentaries claimed that it was a genuine recording secretly filmed by Leopold's father, and that he was now in a clinic because of his internet addiction. The report was sharply criticised by the scene media, and it was stated that protagonist of the video was known for staging it. Nevertheless, he became symbolic of the fear that video games could incite violence in young people. Years later, Focus retracted the article and flagged it from publication.

Due to the increasing distribution, Kochanowski was bullied by classmates. He tried to clarify that the scene was not real, but then deleted all his videos from the internet as far as he could and withdrew. He claims that he eventually "went crazy" from the relentless bullying, which led to him intimidating classmates and drunkenly announcing a potential killing spree at his school. This resulted in him being expelled and serving a month in prison.

== Later life ==
In 2015, Kochanowski began producing videos again on YouTube. These videos detail his fitness training and have no relation to his earlier uploads. He was eventually recognized as the Angry German Kid, but did not initially respond to inquiries about his previous videos or Angry German Kid. At the end of 2017, Kochanowski re-entered the public sphere under the new pseudonym Hercules Beatz. Kochanowski, who was 26 years old at the time and has trained for a bodybuilder's physique, published a diss track in which he talks about the events surrounding the publication of the web video 12 years earlier and insults those who bullied him. Since 2018, he has also published his own rap songs.

Today, the video is considered a prime example of web videos in the 2000s. It has been studied in the context of the psychology of computer users.

== Documentaries ==
- Die unglaubliche Geschichte des Angry German Kid
  (Translation: The Incredible Story of the Angry German Kid), YouTube channel of Funk, 27 May 2020, runtime: 9:50 min)
- Zapp (magazine): Ausgerastet und abgestürzt: Der Fall des Angry German Kid
  (Translation: Freaked out and crashed: The case of the Angry German Kid), YouTube channel of NDR, 1 February 2023 (runtime: 23 min.)
