= Technostress =

Stress caused by technology

Technostress has been defined as the negative psychological relationship between people and the introduction of new technologies. Where ergonomics is the study of how humans physically react to and fit into machines in their environment, technostress is a result of altered behaviors brought about by the use of modern technologies at office and home environments.

People experience technostress when they cannot adapt to or cope with information technologies in a healthy manner. They may feel a compulsive need to stay connected and share constant updates, feel forced to respond to work-related information in real-time, or engage in habitual multi-tasking. They feel compelled to work faster because information flows faster, and have little time for sustained thinking and creative analysis.

Craig Brod, a leader in the field of technostress research, states that technostress is "a modern disease of adaptation caused by an inability to cope with the new computer technologies in a healthy manner." Some of the earliest technostress studies is in the field of Management Information Systems. The studies show that technostress is an undesirable phenomenon spawned by the use of computing and communication devices such as computers, tablets, and smartphones. Newer empirical research in this field, however, indicates that technostress has both positive and negative aspects. Research also suggests that technostress is dependent on gender, age, and computer literacy. Women experience lower technostress than men; older people experience less technostress at work than younger people; and those with greater computer literacy experience lower technostress.

== First use of the term ==
As early as 1984, Brod defined technostress as a “modern disease of adaptation caused by an inability to cope with the new computer technologies in a healthy manner”. Technostress is later considered as the name for mental stress related to technology use, including excessive physiological and emotional arousal.

More recent definitions of technostress refer to it as physical, behavioural, and psychological strain in response to ICT dependence, to increasing computer complexity, and accelerated ICT-driven work changes. Atanasoff and Venable considered technostress in three main categories: transactional and perceived stress, biology, and occupational health.

== Symptoms and outcomes ==
There are a number of symptoms of technostress, including both psychological and physiological symptoms. For example, those experiencing technostress related anxiety may also experience physiological symptoms such as insomnia, loss of temper, irritability, frustration, increased errors in judgement, and poor job performance. Consequences of technostress include decreases in job satisfaction, organizational commitment, and productivity of an individual.

In the 21st century, those who use technology at the workplace are most at risk of experiencing technostress. Increased exposure to computer monitors is associated with emotional stress, and people are emotionally affected by technostress in their workplaces.

Potential causes of technostress:

- Rapid speeds at which technology evolves
- Lack of proper training in technology usage
- Increased workload
- Lack of standardization within technologies
- Reliability issues in hardware and software

Three Aspects of Technostress:

1. Physical aspects include eye strain, backaches, headaches, stiff shoulders, neck pain, joint pain, dry mouth and throat, muscle tension, stomach discomfort, keyboard related injuries, chest pain, rapid heart rate, irritable bowel syndrome, increased blood pressure, and difficulty breathing.
2. Emotional aspects include irritability, loss of temper, having a high state of anxiety when separated from a computer monitor, feelings of indifference, frustration, lack of appreciation, depression, guilt, feeling fearful, paranoia that leads to avoiding computers and negative attitudes.
3. Psychological aspects include composed of information overload in order to find, analyse, evaluate, and apply it in the right context with resources, underwork and routine jobs lead to frustrations when underemployed or when the work done involves only routine operations, job security, where people have a fear that computers may replace human roles, professional jealousy produced by technological competency, de-motivation due to prolonged periods of any technological activity, uncertainty about job role caused by an increased time working with technology.

There are five conditions that are classified as "technostress creators":

1. "Techno-overload" describes situations where use of computers forces people to work more and work faster.
2. "Techno-invasion" describes being “always exposed” where people can potentially be reached anywhere and any time and feel the need to be constantly connected. The regular work-day is extended, office work is done at all sorts of hours, and it is almost impossible to "cut away."
3. "Techno-complexity" describes situations where the complex computer systems used at work force people to spend time and effort in learning and understanding how to use new applications and to update their skills. People find the variety of applications, functions, and jargon intimidating and consequently feel stressed.
4. "Techno-insecurity" is associated with situations where people feel threatened about losing their jobs to other people who have a better understanding of new gadgets and computing devices.
5. "Techno-uncertainty" relates to short life cycles of computer systems. Continuing changes and upgrades do not give people a chance to acquire experience with a particular system. People find this unsettling because their knowledge becomes rapidly outdated and they are required to re-learn things very rapidly and often.

=== Positive and negative sub-processes ===
A recent empirical study on technostress reframes technostress by conceptualizing it in terms of a holistic technostress process involving two critical subprocesses: the techno-eustress subprocess and the techno-distress subprocess. This holistic technostress model frames technostress as a process that hinges on individuals appraising environmental conditions as challenge techno-stressors, defined as techno-stressors that individuals tend to appraise as related to promoting task accomplishment, or hindrance techno-stressors, defined as techno-stressors that individuals tend to appraise as a barrier to task accomplishment. The challenge and hindrance techno-stressors are related to positive and negative psychological states in the individual, respectively, and in turn, positive and negative individual and organizational outcomes. The holistic technostress model and its components were empirically validated in the context of healthcare.

The holistic technostress process model:

1. "Environmental conditions" represent potential sources of technology-related stressful situations that may interact with any other environmental conditions such as role demands, task demands, interpersonal and behavioural expectations, job conditions, and workplace policies, among others.
2. The "Techno-eustress subprocess" involves:
  1. "Challenge techno-stressors" are technostressors that individuals tend to appraise as related to promoting task accomplishment. Examples include usefulness and involvement facilitation.
  2. "Positive psychological responses" are positive psychological responses to a technostressor, as indicated by the presence of positive psychological states.
  3. "Positive outcomes" are positive individual and organizational consequences related to the positive psychological state of the individual. Examples include an increase in job satisfaction and a decrease in turnover intention.
3. The "Techno-distress subprocess" involves:
  1. "Hindrance techno-stressors" are technostressors that individuals tend to appraise as a barrier or obstacle to task accomplishment. Examples include unreliability, insecurity, and overload.
  2. "Negative psychological responses" are negative psychological responses to a technostressor, as indicated by the presence of negative psychological states.
  3. "Negative outcomes" are negative individual and organizational consequences related to the negative psychological state of the individual. Examples include a decrease in job satisfaction and an increase in attrition and turnover intention.

The techno-stressors, psychological responses, and outcomes are governed by three evaluation processes:

1. An "Appraisal process" is an intrapersonal process through which individuals appraise the technology-associated environmental conditions as challenges or hindrances.
2. A "Decision process" is an intrapersonal process through which individuals decide how to respond either positively or negatively to the appraised technostressor. This process occurs before the psychological response but after the individual has determined if the environmental condition represents a challenge or hindrance techno-stressor.
3. A "Performance process" is an intrapersonal process through which individuals decide how to act on their psychological response. This process occurs after the psychological response but before the individual determines his or her outcome.

== Coping strategies ==
Technostress can be treated by getting user friendly software and educating people about new technology and creating better level of reassurance, patience and stability and communication within the job environment. Other option is avoid or restrict use of technology.

Ways to eliminate technostress are conducting stress management activities to lessen and eliminate the problem of technostress such as exercise, meditation, progressive muscle relaxation, positive self talk, staying healthy and having healthy diet. Taking frequent breaks from technology, having a schedule, counseling, having awareness of technostress, establishing a teamwork relationship with colleagues may help.

== See also ==
- Information overload
- Computer rage
- Technophobia
- Culture shock
- Internet fear

== Notes and references ==
General

- Califf, C. B., Sarker, S., & Sarker, S. (2020). The Bright and Dark Sides of Technostress: A Mixed-Methods Study Involving Healthcare IT. MIS Quarterly, Vol. 44, No.2, pp. 809–856.
- Tarafdar, M., Cooper, C.L., Stich, J. The technostress trifecta - techno eustress, techno distress and design: Theoretical directions and an agenda for research, Information Systems Journal, Volume 30, Issue 1, 2019
- Bachiller, R. T. (2001): Technostress among library staff and patrons of the U. P. Diliman libraries. University of the Philippines, Diliman.
- Caguiat, C.A. (2001): Effects of stress and burnout on librarians in selected academic libraries in Metro Manila. University of the Philippines, Diliman.
- Dimzon, S. (2007): Technostress among PAARL members and their management strategies: a basis for a staff development program. PUP, Manila.
- Riedl, R., Kindermann, H., Auinger, A., Javor, A. (2012): Technostress From a Neurobiological Perspective: System Breakdown Increases the Stress Hormone Cortisol in Computer Users. Business & Information Systems Engineering, Vol. 4, No. 2, pp. 61–69.
- Riedl, R. (2013). On the Biology of Technostress: Literature Review and Research Agenda. The Database for Advances in Information Systems, Vol. 44, No. 1, pp. 18–55.
- Riedl, R., Kindermann, H., Auinger, A., Javor, A. (2013): Computer Breakdown as a Stress Factor during Task Completion under Time Pressure: Identifying Gender Differences Based on Skin Conductance. Advances in Human-Computer Interaction, Volume 2013, Article ID 420169.
