= Learning Technology Partners =

Learning Technology Partners (previously known as Convene) is an early distance learning company. The software company was founded in the late 1980s by Larry Allen when he created collaborative seminary training programs. Although Convene still has collaborative software for use by some 15,000 religious leaders, it expanded into an international distance learning software company in 1993. It uses specialized software to facilitate online classes for over 100 universities.

== Learning Technology Partners International ==
Between 1989 and 1993, Allen discussed the company with Jeffery Stein, who had founded an information process company called On-Line Business Systems. Working with Reda Athanasios, Stein, buoyed by his experience founding a computer-based service company, played the largest role in turning the early software company into Convene International. As part of its transformation, the company began offering asynchronous distance learning software in Windows (instead of DOS) and eventually added 24/7 phone tech support. The first major client to offer the service was the University of Phoenix online campus, then in its fledgling years. Convene International then expanded to over 45,000 students at more than 100 universities in the United States and elsewhere.

Stein left the company in 2000 to form a corporate advisory services company, Peyton Investments. He is the chair of the IT History Society. In 2002, the Learning Technology Partners, a similar company, bought Convene in 2012 for an undisclosed sum.

== Sources ==
- Jeffery R. Young. "Distance Education Transforms Help Desks Into '24-7' Operations" The Chronicle of Higher Education. May 26, 2000. Retrieved September 14, 2007.
- Ann Hill. "One Company’s Impact On The World Of On-Line Learning" ALN Magazine. March 1998. Retrieved September 14, 2007.
- Hill, Ann (August 25, 1998). "Convene Appoints Reda S. Athanasios President and Chief Operating Officer". Business Wire. Archived from the original on June 16, 2011 – via FindArticles.
- "Learning Technology Partners buys Convene" San Francisco Business Times. September 5, 2002. Retrieved September 14, 2007.
