= History of virtual learning environments =

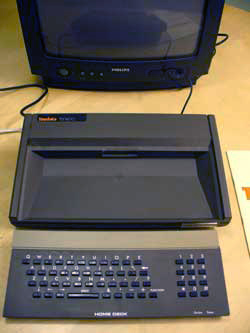
Tandata Td1400 Prestel terminal

A Virtual Learning Environment (VLE) is a system specifically designed to facilitate the management of educational courses by teachers for their students. It predominantly relies on computer hardware and software, enabling distance learning. In North America, this concept is commonly denoted as a "Learning Management System" (LMS).

== Terminology ==
Key terminology to describe virtual learning environments include:

- Computer Based Training (CBT)
- Learning Management System (LMS)
- Massive open online course (MOOC)

== Pre-1940s ==
Pressey Testing Machine (exterior)

Pressey Testing Machine (interior)

- 1728: March 20, Boston Gazette contains an advertisement from Caleb Phillipps, "Teacher of the New Method of Short Hand," advising that any "Persons in the Country desirous to Learn this Art, may by having the several Lessons sent weekly to them, be as perfectly instructed as those that live in Boston."
- 1840: Isaac Pitman begins teaching shorthand, using Great Britain's Penny Post.
- 1874: Institutionally sponsored distance education began in the United States US in 1874 at the Illinois Wesleyan University.
- 1873: The University of the Cape of Good Hope (the current University of South Africa www.unisa.ac.za, Cape Town, South Africa, Africa) was launched in Cape Town, based on the existing University of London, UK, with accreditation Boucher, M 1973 Spes in Ardius The history of the University of South Africa, Pretoria, Unisa, p. 2-8, following on the start of the South African College with a Council of Examinations in 1829 to use written examinations to certify work abilities of clerks (not verbal or status as ability). This followed similar initial developments around 1854 spearheaded by the University of London and Queen's University Ireland, and expanded to Canada, Calcutta, and India.
- 1890: International Correspondence Schools (ICS) is launched by newspaperman Thomas J. Foster in Scranton, Pennsylvania and becomes the world's largest study-at-home school.
- 1883: The Correspondence University of Ithaca, New York (a correspondence school) was founded in 1883.
- 1892: The term "distance education" was first used in America a University of Wisconsin–Madison catalog for the 1892 school year.
- 1906–7: The University of Wisconsin–Extension was founded, the first true distance learning institution in America.
- 1909: The Machine Stops a short story by E. M. Forster, which describes an audio/visual communication network being used to deliver a lecture on Australian music to a remote audience.
- 1920s: Sidney Pressey, an educational psychology professor at Ohio State University, develops the first "teaching machine." This device offered drill and practice exercises, and multiple choice questions.
- 1929: M.E. LaZerte, Director of the School of Education, University of Alberta, developed a set of instructional devices for teaching and learning. For example, he "developed several devices and methods to minimize instructor-as-testor involvement, so as to increase the likelihood of gathering data in a consistent manner." One mechanical device that he developed was the "problem cylinder" which could present a problem to a student and check whether the steps to a solution given by the student were correct.

== 1940s ==
1945

- Vannevar Bush describes a hypertext-like device called the "memex" in his article As we may think in The Atlantic.

1948

- Norbert Wiener writes about human-machine communications in his landmark book "Cybernetics or Control and Communication in the Animal and the Machine" (MIT Press, 1948).

== 1950s ==
=== 1953 ===
- The University of Houston offers the first televised college credit classes via KUHT, the first public television station in the United States. The live telecasts ran from 13 to 15 hours each week, making up about 38% of the program schedule. Most courses aired at night so that students who worked during the day could watch them. By the mid-1960s, with about one-third of the station's programming devoted to education, more than 100,000 semester hours had been taught on KUHT.

=== 1953–1956 ===
- B. F. Skinner develops "programmed instruction" [B.F. Skinner Foundation – Better Behavioral Science for a More Humane World] and an updated "teaching machine".

=== 1956 ===
- Gordon Pask and Robin McKinnon-Wood develop SAKI, the first adaptive teaching system to go into commercial production. SAKI taught keyboard skills and it optimized the rate by which a trainee keyboard operator learned by making the difficulty level of the tasks contingent on the learner's performance. As the learner's performance improved the rate of teaching increased and instructional support was delayed.

=== 1956–1958 ===
- Harvey White, a physics professor at U.C. Berkeley, produced 163 high school physics lessons at Pittsburgh's PBS station WQED that were broadcast into public schools in the area. Each 30 minute lesson was also filmed and subsequently distributed to dozens of educational/public television stations. In the academic year 1957–1958, White's television physics course was used in many thousands of public school classrooms across the nation in which over 100,000 students were enrolled. This course already made evident two important characteristics of distance education that carry over to contemporary online instruction: enormous economies of scale and higher labor productivity of the classroom based teacher/tutor/facilitator.

=== 1957 ===
- Frank Rosenblatt invented the "perceptron" in 1957 at the Cornell Aeronautical Laboratory in an attempt to understand human memory, learning, and cognitive processes. This was the beginning of machine learning.

=== 1958 ===
- Charles Bourne and Douglas Engelbart publish an article in the DATAMATION magazine that outlines the requirements of and a proposal for a National Technical Information Service for the USA.

=== 1959 ===
- Rath, Anderson, and Brainerd reported a project using an IBM 650 to teach binary arithmetic to students.
- The University of Chicago first produces Sunrise Semester, a series of courses delivered via broadcast television.

== 1960s ==
=== 1960 ===
- PLATO (Programmed Logic for Automated Teaching Operations) system developed at the University of Illinois at Urbana–Champaign in a project led by Dr. Donald Bitzer. Some rights to PLATO, including the trademark, are now owned by Edmentum (formerly PLATO Learning), which delivers managed course content over the Internet. The PLATO system featured multiple roles, including students, who could study assigned lessons and communicate with teachers through on-line notes, instructors, who could examine student progress data, as well as communicate and take lessons themselves, and authors, who could do all of the above, plus create new lessons. There was also a fourth type of user, called a multiple, which was used for demonstrations of the PLATO system.
- Project Xanadu, the first known attempt at implementing a hypertext system, founded by Ted Nelson.
- Teaching Machines Inc, a group of psychologists produced a series of programmed learning texts. The texts were based on the work of B.F. Skinner, breaking complicated tasks to a one-step-at-a-time activity (terminal learning objectives). Grolier and TMI marketed Min-Max (a teaching machine) with machine programs and programmed text books.

=== 1962 ===
- Douglas Engelbart publishes his seminal work, "Augmenting Human Intellect: a conceptual framework". In this paper, he proposes using computers to augment training. With his colleagues at the Stanford Research Institute, Engelbart started to develop a computer system to augment human abilities, including learning. The system was simply called the oNLine System (NLS), and it debuted in 1968.
- The initial concept of a global information network should be given to J.C.R. Licklider in his series of memos entitled "On-Line Man Computer Communication", written in August 1962. However, the actual development of the internet must be given to Lawrence G. Roberts of MIT.

=== 1963 ===
- Ivan Sutherland develops Sketchpad, the first graphical user interface for a computer, and publishes a description of it in his PhD dissertation at MIT.
- The first computer for instruction is installed at Orange Coast College, California.
- A chapter in the Daily Express Science Annual, entitled Teaching Machines and Programmed Learning, describes interactive teaching machines and shows photos of a number of systems including The Grundy Tutor, The Auto Tutor and the Empirical Tutor. These electronic devices present frames of information followed by questions, and branch to other frames depending on the button pressed by the learner. The article states that the Auto Tutor was designed by Norman Crowder, an American psychologist. It describes a British machine, the Empirical Tutor thus: "In addition to the printed programme it can use film sequences, slide projectors, tape recorders or even real apparatus, which the student may use to help him to decide how to answer the question in the frame". The article also refers to a language teaching system developed by Professor Rand Morton of Michigan University. A science fiction story in the same Annual, by Brian Aldiss, predicts mobile learning, wearable computing, brain–computer interfaces, the development of personal computing in the nineteen-seventies, and concern over global warming.
- Douglas Engelbart invents the computer mouse, and a prototype is constructed by Bill English. Engelbart was awarded a patent in 1970 for an improved version of the mouse.

=== 1964 ===
- The first authoring system for developing lessons and courses on a computer system is produced. CATO, ("Compiler for Automatic Teaching Operations") on the PLATO system allowed the development of various forms of "teaching logic" for fields varying from mathematics to the behavioral sciences.
- The Computer Assisted Instruction Laboratory is established at Pennsylvania State University, College of Education.
- The Altoona Area School District in Pennsylvania began to use computers to instruct students.

=== 1965 ===
- A five-year study of the impact of the PLATO system is published. Here are some highlights: "The results of exploratory queuing studies show that the system could teach as many as a thousand students simultaneously, while still allowing each student to proceed through the material independently." The PLATO system had two different ways to teach – "tutorial logic" where the system presented facts and examples, and then asked questions on the materials presented, and "inquiry logic" where the student could request and organize appropriate information from the computer. The presentation of materials ("slide selector") was called an electronic book. The store of information in the system was called an electronic blackboard. PLATO had a sophisticated help system, whereby different types of wrong answers resulted in the student being sent different help sequences. A rudimentary spell checker was included in the system. A comment page allowed the student to comment on the lessons at any time. An instructor page allowed the instructor to communicate with the student. A "perfect workbook" recorded student responses to questions, as well as kept a record of each button the student pushed and the time the button was pushed. These records were stored on magnetic tape for later statistical analysis.
- IBM, via its subsidiary Science Research Associates, Inc., introduces COURSEWRITER for the IBM 1500, an online interactive CAI system in the 1960s. The system included course management features and roles for the users such as instructor, manager, and student, and allowed intercommunication among them. Stanford University participated in the research and development that predated the IBM 1500s release.
- Ted Nelson uses the terms "hypertext" and "hypermedia" in his paper Complex information processing: a file structure for the complex, the changing and the indeterminate.
- Research in the field of computer-assisted instruction began in France at the universities in Paris, Grenoble and Toulouse.
- The Department of Industrial and Vocational Education at the University of Alberta purchased a "Fabritek transistorized training computer" to teach students in electronics courses.

=== 1967 ===
- The Division of Educational Research Services was formed at the University of Alberta, and this unit immediately acquired an electronic optical examination scoring machine, and an IBM magnetic tape typewriter. It shared an IBM 360/67 computer with the rest of the university, and used it mostly for statistical analysis.
- The CAN (Completely Arbitrary Name) authoring language is developed by staff at the Ontario Institute for Studies in Education (OISE). "The initial design goal was to provide a lesson authoring language which could be used by classroom instructors with limited knowledge of computing."
- The first CAI application is written in APL for the Faculty of Education at the University of Alberta. It consisted of an arithmetic drill program that "automatically adjusted its level of difficulty as a function of the student's rate of success".

=== 1968 ===
- Telesecundaria a system based on satellite TV for secondary students in rural areas, was set up by the Mexican Government. Initially, over 6,500 students were served in 304 classrooms, each one equipped with a satellite dish and a black-and-white TV set. The system is still in use, but now reaches over a million students in 16,000 rural facilities in Mexico and several Central American countries.
- An IBM 1500 system was installed at the University of Alberta, where on-line courses included cardiology training for the university's medical school. This system was finally taken out of service on April 10, 1980, after twelve years of operation. Over 20,000 people had used the system in that interval, and programming was available for 17 university courses. The instructional operating system of the IBM 1500 had a registration system, bookmarking, authoring, and progress reports all built-in.
- Alan Kay, a graduate student at the University of UTAH, proposes the FLEX language. The FLEX Machine, a computer running the FLEX language is the first attempt to develop an object-oriented programming-based personal computer.
- Douglas Engelbart and 17 of his colleagues demonstrate the new oNLine System (NLS) at the Fall Joint Computer Conference held at the Convention Center in San Francisco.
- The MITRE Corporations begins development of their Time-shared, Interactive, Computer-Controlled, Information Television (TICCIT) system. It is described as a computer based system of instruction that is "low-cost, high quality education that is completely individualized."

=== 1969 ===
- The US Department of Defense commissions ARPANET (and thus the Internet as we know it).
- Stanford University broadcasts 12 Stanford engineering courses on two channels via the Stanford Instructional Television Network (SITN).
- The first Associate Committee on Instructional Technology is formed at the National Research Council of Canada.
- Karl L. Zinn published a report entitled "Comparative study of languages for programming interactive use of computers in instruction" – EDUCOM Research Memorandum RM-1469.
- R. Allen Avner and Paul Tenczar publish a manual for TUTOR, the authoring language of the PLATO system.
- The Language Information Network and Clearinghouse System (LINCS) Project of the Center for Linguistics at the National Science Foundation in Washington, DC was developed as a computerized information management system to facilitate the transfer of scientific information within the language science community.
- Beginning of a seven-year project called Project Solo or Soloworks in Pittsburgh, USA. The group put out 33 newsletters over the course of the project. This is an early example of student controlled, individualized use of computers in education. The idea of going "solo" was that the student was in charge of his or her own learning. However, the limitations of the approach were also recognized, and the group ended up proposing a "Community of Learning" model in 1976.
- The Merit Computer Network interconnects the mainframe computers at three large universities – University of Michigan, Michigan State University, and Wayne State University. The Merit Network facilitated instructional uses of computing facilities among the three institutions.

== 1970s ==
=== 1970 ===
- The Havering Computer Managed Learning System was developed in London, England. By 1980 it had been used by over 10,000 students and 100 teachers in applications that included science technology, remedial mathematics, career guidance, and industrial training.
- Flanagan reports on Project Plan, where computers were used for learning management, though a student-centric model that integrated information on students past achievement, interests, etc. to develop an individualized plan of study which served to guide the learner through a series of Teacher Learning Units. This was implemented though a medium-sized computer and terminals in the schools.
- California funded a two-year project to determine the potential needs of distance education in the future.
- Computers first used in elementary schools in Saskatoon, Saskatchewan, Canada.
- National Science Foundation (NSF) funded three initial projects for the study of "Natural Language Processing." These projects included the University of California, Irvine Physics Computer Development Project, headed by Alfred Bork and Research Assistant, Richard L. Ballard. The Mitre Ticcit Project conducted at the University of Texas, later moved to Brigham Young University in Provo, Utah, and its sister project called the PLATO Project, was conducted at the University of Illinois, Champaign. Over 140 natural language dialog programs were created between 1970 and 1978. UCI's Physics Computer Development Project conducted approximately 55 educational programs and spearheaded development throughout the UC system. Initial projects were conducted on Teletype model 33, paper tape punch machine that operated at a 110 baud rate.

=== 1971 ===
- The MITRE Corporation begins a year-long demonstration of the TICCIT system among Reston, Virginia cable television subscribers. Interactive television services included informational and educational demonstrations using a touch-tone telephone. The National Science Foundation refunds the PLATO project and funds MITRE's proposal to modify its TICCIT technology as a computer-assisted instruction (CAI) system to support English and algebra at community colleges. MITRE subcontracts instructional design and courseware authoring tasks to the University of Texas at Austin and Brigham Young University.
- Project EXTEND was set up in Michigan as a "small college consulting service for instructional computing." It offered programming support and faculty development to those university instructors who wanted to get involved with computer-based instruction.
- University of Delaware forms Project DELTA (Delaware Total Approach to Education). The project provides Computer Aided Instruction to high school students throughout Delaware utilizing instructional material served from a central DEC PDP-11/70.
- Ivan Illich describes computer-based "learning webs" in his book Deschooling Society. Among the features of his proposed system are
  - Reference Services to Educational Objects — which facilitate access to things or processes used for formal learning.
  - Skill Exchanges — which permit persons to list their skills, the conditions under which they are willing to serve as models for others who want to learn these skills, and the addresses at which they can be reached.
  - Peer-Matching — a communications network which permits persons to describe the learning activity in which they wish to engage, in the hope of finding a partner for the inquiry.
  - Reference Services to Educators-at-Large — who can be listed in a directory giving the addresses and self-descriptions of professionals, paraprofessionals, and free-lancers, along with conditions of access to their services.

=== 1972 ===
- Patrick Suppes, professor at Stanford University, developed computer-based courses in Logic and Set Theory that were offered to Stanford undergraduates from 1972 to 1992.
- The Learning Research Group is formed at Xerox PARC in Palo Alto, California. It is led by Alan Kay, who advanced the idea of a graphical user interface (GUI) by inventing icons for folders, menus, and overlapping windows. Kay and his group envisioned a computer for teaching and learning that they called the "KiddiKomputer", to be programmed using the Smalltalk language they had developed. While Kay could see many educational uses for this computer, he had four initial projects in mind: 1) Teaching thinking skills, 2) Teaching modeling through the simulation of systems, 3) Teaching interface skills, and 4) Tracking what children would do with the computer outside school hours, when left to their own devices. Second level projects for teaching children with a computer included 1) Computer evaluation, 2) Iconic programming, especially for children under 8. Kay and his colleagues started teaching programming to children and adults in 1973.
- First Canadian Symposium on Instructional Technology held in Calgary, Alberta.

=== 1973 ===
- The National Development Program in Computer Assisted Learning was set up in the UK in January, 1973.
- A report written for the University of Michigan described the educational uses of computers at the university. These included "drill, skills practice, programmed and dialog tutorials, testing and diagnosis, simulation, gaming, information processing, computation, problem solving, model construction, graphic display, the management of instructional resources, and the presentation and display of materials."
- An integrated student information system at Trinity University in Texas maintained data on about 1,500 variables. These included all student academic and personal data, all faculty data that dealt with courses and teaching, all course data in regards to student, faculty and class meeting times and days, enrollments, buildings, and the college calendar and catalog. There was also "an interaction course management system".
- As a post-doc at Carnegie-Mellon University, Jay Warner needed to teach undergraduate metallurgy students how to use new software that would calculate phase diagrams (graphical representations of metal states/phases as a function of composition and temperature) based on thermodynamic properties. He wrote a CAI (Computer-Assisted Instruction) module that, however crudely, used some of the principles discussed in this article. A frame, or paragraph of information, was presented, and the machine branched to different follow-up frames and questions depending on the response to the embedded questions. The whole thing was written in FORTRAN IV. It proved useful; students could then use the software without close attendance by the instructor. This work was in no way as dramatic as the other accomplishments of the day, however it does show that by this time CAL was not restricted to studies of learning methods.

=== 1974 ===
- Murray Turoff founded the Computerized Conferencing and Communications Center at New Jersey Institute of Technology (NJIT) and over the next 15 years conducts an immense amount of research on Computer-mediated communication (CMC) with Starr Roxanne Hiltz. Much of this is on its applicability to the "Virtual Classroom", including field trials in the 1980s. The specifications for EIES 2 are particularly seminal – note in particular the material on roles, resources and hypertext.
- Launched in June 1974, Creative Computing was the first computer magazine for general readers and hobbyists. The Jan–Feb 1976 issue had an article on "Learning with Computer Games".
- An "international school" was held in a remote Italian resort to explore the state of the art of computer-assisted instruction (CAI). Direct connections with computers in Italy and the United States made it possible to demonstrate a variety of existing CAI systems. Papers describing the use of CAI in five sets of educational institutions were presented.

=== 1975 ===
- The NSF-funded TICCIT Project begins testing English and algebra courseware at Northern Virginia Community College in Alexandria, Virginia, and at Phoenix College, part of the Maricopa County Community College District system in Phoenix, Arizona. The modified TICCIT system supports 128 student terminals made of modified television sets providing text and graphics in seven colors, digital audio, and a video switching device to embed video into the computer generated instruction. A specialized keyboard allows students to control their own progress through the courseware, which includes both tutorials, drills, and testing. What is interesting about TICCIT is that it was based on a learner controlled command language that allowed the user to manipulate his or her own sequencing and development of learning strategies.
- COMIT was a sophisticated system of computer-assisted instruction developed jointly by IBM and the University of Waterloo in Canada. It emphasized unique audiovisual capabilities of the television set and light pens. The project ran until 1978.
- The Michigan Terminal System (MTS), a computer time-sharing operating system developed at the University of Michigan, included a program called CONFER developed by Robert Parnes that gave it the capabilities of computer conferencing.

=== 1976 ===
- Edutech Project of Encinitas California (now Digital ChoreoGraphics of Newport Beach, CA) develops DOTTIE, a TV Set-Top device linking the home TV to online services such as CompuServ and The Source via a common household telephone.
- Development of the language Pop11 (derived from the Edinburgh AI language Pop2) and its teaching tools starts at the University of Sussex. This later evolved into Poplog.
- Development of the KOM computer conferencing system begins at Stockholm University. See Jacob Palme's history of KOM
- First experimental developments at the Open University of what became the Cyclops system – then called a telewriting or audio-graphic system but nowadays would be called a whiteboard system – under two separate teams in the Faculties of Mathematics (Read and Bacsich) and Technology (Pinches and Liddell) – the first team focusing on storage on cassette tape of digital data to drive VDUs, the second focusing on transmission of handwriting over telephone lines. There were similar developments under way in the US and France.
- Coastline Community College, having no physical campus, became the first Virtual College in the United States.
- Second Canadian Symposium on Instructional Technology held in Quebec City, Quebec.
- Open University in the UK sets up the CICERO project with three courses taught online.
- A report by Karl L. Zinn at the University of Michigan describes computer-based conferencing, computer-based seminars, computer-assisted curriculum development, computer-based committees, and computer-based proposal preparation.

=== 1977 ===
- With the Canadian federal Department of Communications, TVOntario (TVO) pioneered the use of satellites for educational teleconferencing and direct-to-home transmission through the Hermes project. The experiment allowed students in California and Toronto to interact via electronic classrooms.
- The Communications Research Center of the Canadian federal government's Department of Communications developed Telidon, a second generation videotext system that was used in field trials in several educational settings.
- At the UK Open University, the software and hardware teams developing telewriting systems merged to form the Cyclops project and gained funding, initially internally, later from UK government sources. There is little trace of Cyclops now on the Open University web site.

=== 1978 ===
- Goal Systems International (later as part of Legent Corp.) started developing CBT solutions originally developed by The Ohio State University. Its PHOENIX software delivered "virtual classrooms" to many corporate networks.(Goal Systems was later acquired by Legent Corporation, in turn acquired by Computer Associates. The Phoenix product line was spun off by Computer Associates to Pathlore Software.) Pathlore was acquired by SumTotal Systems in 2005.
- The National Science Foundation releases its evaluation of the MITRE TICCIT project demonstration, giving a mixed review of the success of using the computer-television system as the primary source of instruction for English and algebra.
- The Defense Research Institute in Sweden released the KOM computer conferencing system which (at its peak) had a thousand users

=== 1979 ===
- Prestel, claimed by BT as "the world's first public viewdata service", was opened in London in September, running on a cluster of minicomputers. It had been conceived in the early 1970s by Samuel Fedida of the Post Office Research Laboratories at Dollis Hill, London. Similar developments were under way in France (Teletel) and Canada (Telidon). Only those active at the time will remember the sense of euphoria and opening of possibilities in what would now be called the e-business and e-learning worlds. (The concept was premature, although in France it had most success.) A number of mainframe, minicomputer and even micro-computer based systems and services were later developed in educational circles of which perhaps the best known were OPTEL, Communitel, ECCTIS and NERIS.
- In Canada, groups including TVOntario, Athabasca University, the University of Victoria, and the University of Waterloo participated in Telidon experiments during the late 70s and early 80s. Telidon, an alphageometric videotex information system used set-top boxes with TV sets, or subsequently software decoders running on PCs (Apple II, MAC, and PC decoders were available) to display text and graphics. The intent was to demonstrate and develop educational applications for videotex and teletext systems. This work continued until 1983, when the Telidon coding structure became a North American standard – ANSI T500 – NAPLPS (North American Presentation Layer Protocol Syntax).
- The Athabasca University educational Telidon project used a Unix path structure which allowed the storage of information pages in the file system tree. This is now the universal storage method for pages on the internet. As described, the system had the ability to create separate user groups with different access privileges, and to implement "action scripts" to access system functions, including email and dynamic content generation. The AU system was described in Abell, R.A. "Implementation of a Telidon System Using UNIX File Structures" in Godfrey, D. and Chang, E. (eds) The Telidon Book, Reston Publishing Company, Reston, VA, 1981)
- An article by Karl L. Zinn in Educational Technology describes the uses of microcomputers at the University of Michigan. Uses included "word processing, extending laboratory experience, simulation, games, tutorial uses, and building skills in computing."

== 1980s ==
=== 1980 ===
- Successmaker is a K–12 learning management system with an emphasis on reading, spelling and numeracy. According to the Pearson Digital Learning website, the South Colonie Central School District in Albany, New York "has been using SuccessMaker since 1980, and in 1997 the district upgraded the software to SuccessMaker version 5.5."
- The Open University begins a pilot trial of a viewdata (videotex) system OPTEL, on a DEC-20 mainframe. This had been conceived by Peter Zorkoczy even before the launch of the national Prestel system in 1979 and was locally specified and coded (in COBOL) by Peter Frogbrook (RIP) and Gyan Mathur. One of the main motivations was its applicability to online learning. It was available via dial-up from home, and later in the 1980s via telnet(!) on the X.25 and internet networks. There were individual user codes and passwords, giving different access rights; the one generic access code was regularly attacked by hackers even in these far-off days, as URLs still on the web attest. The system is overviewed in "Viewdata-Style Delivery Mechanisms for CAL", CAL Research Group Technical Report No. 11.
- Seymour Papert at MIT publishes "Mindstorms: children, computers, and powerful ideas". (New York: Basic Books). This book inspired a number of books and dissertations on "microworlds" and their impact on learning.
- The idea of managing teaching resources using a computer is described in a paper by J.M. Leclerc and S. Normand from the University of Montreal. Their system was programmed in BASIC, and used a computer to track documents, human resources, structured activities, and places for training and observation. Evaluation activities were also available in the system.
- The University of Montreal offered CAFÉ, a computer system that taught written French. Graduated groups of questions were generated according to individual indicators. Students went through the system at their own pace.
- TLM (The Learning Manager) was released in 1980 and included distinct roles for students, instructors, educational assistants, and administrators. The system could be accessed remotely by dial-up as a student or an instructor using a terminal emulator. The system had a sophisticated test bank capability and generated tests and practice activities based on a learning objective data structure. Instructors and students could communicate through the terminal. Instructors could lock out students or post messages. Originally called LMS (Learning Management System), TLM was used extensively at SAIT (Southern Alberta Institute of Technology) and Bow Valley College, both located in Calgary, Alberta, Canada.

=== 1981 ===
- School of Management and Strategic Studies at the Western Behavioral Sciences Institute in La Jolla, California starts an online program.
- University of Sussex, UK, implements Poplog, an interactive learning environment for AI and computing students. It includes hyperlinked teaching materials, an extensible text editor, multiple programming languages and interactive demonstrations of AI programs.

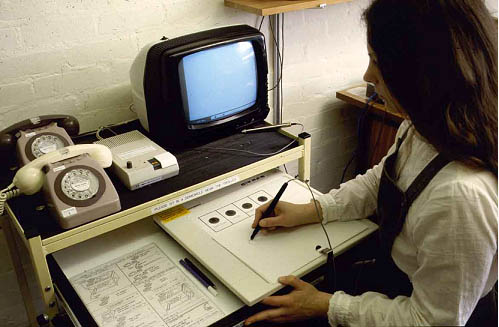
Cyclops telewriting system, tutor's station

- Field trials begin of the Cyclops whiteboard system in the East Midlands Region of the Open University and run for two years. The evaluation was funded by a grant from British Telecom and allowed the evaluation Director Tony Bates to employ Mike Sharples and David McConnell as research fellows. Audio-visual material for Cyclops was produced on the Cyclops Studio , a multimedia editing system coded in UCSD Pascal by a software team led by Paul Bacsich and including Mark Woodman. Cyclops was later awarded a BCS prize for innovation and systems installed in Indonesia. There are only passing references now to Cyclops on the open Web (see under names cited) – the best source of specifications and chronology is the article "Cyclops:shared-screen teleconferencing" in The Role of Technology in Distance Education, edited Tony Bates, Croom Helm, 1984.
- Over this period the Open University was also developing its own viewdata (videotex) system, called OPTEL, for use in education. This had in fact started about the same time as Cyclops in yet another team at the OU. The project ran until about 1985 when it faded away, as did videotex generally across the world (except the Minitel in France). In addition to OPTEL, several other systems were implemented including VOS (Videotex Operating System) which allowed the display and manipulation of text files via videotex. VOS was further developed into a telesoftware, transactional (gateway) and email system and then used in a commercial development for IMS, the media research company (using a very early precursor of Web/CGI development). These were coded in Pascal and COBOL on the DEC-20 mainframe. Some of the ideas of OPTEL were taken over into the ECCTIS project delivering course data via viewdata from a Unisys mainframe – indeed one of the former OPTEL staff joined ECCTIS as Director. Systems were also specified to deliver Computer-Assisted Learning – see in particular the article "Viewdata systems" in The Role of Technology in Distance Education. There are only fragmentary references now to OPTEL on the open Web.
- Allen Communication in Salt Lake City, Utah, introduced the first commercial interactive videodisc.
- BITNET, founded by a consortium of US and Canadian universities, allowed universities to connect with each other for educational communications and e-mail. At its peak in 1991, it had over 500 organizations as members and over 3000 nodes. Its use declined as the World Wide Web grew.
- Alfred Bork wrote an article entitled Information Retrieval in Education, in which he identified the ways "computer-based techniques can be used for course management, direct learning, and research."

=== 1982 ===
- The Computer Assisted Learning Center (CALC) founded as a small, offline computer-based, adult learning center. Origins of CALCampus
- Edutech Project of Encinitas California (now Digital ChoreoGraphics of Newport Beach, CA) implements PIES, an interactive online educational development and delivery system for the PILOT author language, using a client-server paradigm for online delivery of personalized courseware to students via popular video-game consoles and micro-computers. The system was used by Pepperdine University, Georgia Tech, San Diego County Department of Education, and Alaska Department of Education for distance learning.
- CET (later NCET and now Becta) publishes Videotex in Education: A new technology briefing, a 54-page booklet written by Vincent Thompson, Mike Brown and Chris Knowles. This is out of print and few copies are now available. (ISBN 0-86184-072-0)
- Hermann Maurer invents MUPID, an innovative videotex device later used widely in Austria. This starts a strand of development leading on to Hyper-G and a range of other developments. See also the of Hyper-G.
- Carnegie Mellon University and IBM create the Information Technology Center which begins the Andrew Project at Carnegie Mellon. One of the primary goals of the project is to provide a platform for "computer-aided instruction" using a distributed workstation computing environment, authenticated access to both personal and public file spaces in a distributed file system (AFS), authoring tools for computer-based lessons, and collaboration tools including bulletin boards and electronic messaging.
- Peter Smith of the UK Open University completes his PhD thesis (157 pp) on "Radiotext: an application of computer and communication systems in distance teaching". (Only one reference online.) It is believed that the work started in the late 1970s under the supervision of Peter Zorkoczy, who also conceived the OPTEL viewdata system. Radiotext denoted the transmission of data over radio signals, just as it can be sent over telephone lines. It may seem normal now, as in the Radio Data System (RDS) in these days of digital radio, but in the 1970s the concept was novel and complex for their colleagues to grasp.

=== 1983 ===
- McConnell, D. and Sharples, M. (1983). Distance teaching by Cyclops: an educational evaluation of the Open University's telewriting system. British Journal of Educational Technology, 14(2), pp. 109–126. Paper describes the CYCLOPS system, developed at the Open University UK in the early 1980s, which provides multi-site tutoring through a shared whiteboard system providing voice conferencing combined with synchronous handwriting and real-time annotation of downloaded graphics. A more comprehensive set of six short papers describing Cyclops was published in Media in Education and Development vol. 16 no. 2, June 1983, pp. 58–74.
- Aregon International rewrote the Cyclops content authoring system as the Excom 100 Studio and created and produced the Excom 100 terminal, a commercial version of the Cyclops terminal incorporating lightpen, graphics tablet, and keyboard as input devices. Excom 100 was awarded the BCS IT award in the "Application" category for 1983. 03:20, 13 November 2010 (UTC)
- MIT announces a 5-year, Institute wide experiment to explore innovative uses of computers for teaching. This initiative is known as Project Athena.
- Fourth Canadian Symposium on Instructional Technology held in Winnipeg in October 1983.

=== 1984 ===
- Asymetrix founded by Paul Allen (a colleague of Bill Gates). Asymetrix created ToolBook. Later it became Click2Learn and then merged with Docent to become SumTotal Systems which offers a complete Learning Management solution.
- The Annenberg/CPB project (funded by the Annenberg Foundation) publishes Electronic text and higher education: a summary of research findings and field experiences, Report number 1 in their "Electronic Text Report Series". This reviews videotex and teletext experiences relevant to education in the US, UK and Canada. This document may help to counteract received wisdom that prior to the Web, US agencies did not undertake studies of the relevance of online systems to education.
- In the Faculty Authoring Development Program and Courseware Authoring Tools Project at Stanford University (1984–1990s) several dozen teaching applications were created, including tutorials in economics, drama simulations, thermodynamics lessons, and historical and anthropological role-playing games.
- Article on "Computing at Carnegie-Mellon University" describes the benefits to students and faculty of a new project using networked personal computers set up by IBM and the university.
- Students and faculty at the University of Waterloo use IBM PCs networked together to do their work and to develop applications (a "JANET"). One PC acts as a server for files in the network.
- The OECD organized a conference in Paris, France, on "Education and the New Information Technology."
- Antic (magazine) publishes a review of a cartridge for Atari 8-bit computers allowing Atari users to access courseware on the CDC PLATO system via modem.
- Computer Teaching Corporation (CTC) launched TenCORE which was the leading authoring language in the late 1980s. It was MS-DOS based. CTC also produced a network-based Computer Managed Instruction System which allowed users to take on the roles of author, student and administrator and to create and participate in a plurality of courses.
- The Intercultural Learning Network created at UC, San Diego linked schools in Japan, Israel, Mexico, and California and Alaska in the U.S. in the first online Learning Circle. This effort was funded by an Apple "wheels for the Mind" grant.
- ComSubLant adopts an elearning program for use on all U.S. submarines to train crewmen at sea. It was developed by FTG1 Doner Caldwell at Submarine Group Six and ran on the Tektronix 4052A computer. The program utilized a lesson / test bank covering all submarine sonar publications on large format tape cartridge.

=== 1985 ===
- In 1985, the Graduate School of Computer and Information Sciences, at Nova Southeastern University, pioneers accredited graduate degrees through online courses, awarding their first doctorate.
- In 1985, Patrick Suppes, professor at Stanford University, received a grant from the National Science Foundation to develop a first-year calculus course on computer. After several years of development and testing in summer camps, computer-based courses in Beginning Algebra, Intermediate Algebra, and Precalculus were created and tested during the 1991–92 academic year. In Fall 1992, after porting the software to the Windows operating system, the Education Program for Gifted Youth (EPGY) was formally launched at Stanford University, making these courses available to qualified students.
- Project Athena at MIT, on the potential uses of advanced computer technology in the university curriculum, has been underway for two years by this time, and about 60 educational development projects are in progress.
- The SuperBook Project started at Bell Communications Research, Morristown, USA. The purpose of the project was to find new ways of navigating online books. Jacob Nielsen commented online that "In 1990, Bell Communications Research's SuperBook project proved the benefits of integrating search results with navigation menus and other information space overviews."
- The decision is taken (at the CALITE 85 conference) to found ASCILITE, the Australian Society of Computers In Learning In Tertiary Education. (It took two more years for all details to be finalised.) See the history of ASCILITE. ASCILITE is the co-publisher of the Australasian Journal of Educational Technology (AJET).

=== 1986 ===
- Tony Bates publishes "Computer Assisted Learning or Communications: Which Way for Information Technology in Distance Education?", Journal of Distance Education/ Revue de l'enseignement a distance, reflecting (in 1986!) on ways forward for e-learning, based on 15 years of operational use of computer networks at the Open University and nine years of systematic R&D on CAL, viewdata/videotex, audio-graphic teleconferencing and computer conferencing. Many of the systems specification issues discussed later are rehearsed here.
- Edward Barrett comes to MIT in the Program in Writing and Humanistic Studies. He becomes co-director of a group working on a distance learning project called the "Networked Educational Online System" (NEOS), a suite of programs for teaching writing and other subjects in specially designed electronic seminar rooms.
- First version of LISTSERV is written by Eric Thomas, an engineering student in Paris, France. It was first used in the BITNET network for electronic mailing lists among universities.
- Fifth Canadian Symposium on Instructional Technology held May 5–7 in Ottawa.
- First version of CSILE installed on a small network of Cemcorp ICON computers at an elementary school in Toronto, Canada. CSILE included text and graphical notes authored by several kinds of users (students, teachers, others) with attributes such as comments and thinking types which reflect the role of the note in the author's thinking. Thinking types included "my theory", "new information", and "I need to understand". CSILE later evolved into Knowledge Forum.
- Intersystem Concepts, Inc., founded by Steven Okonski and Gary Dickelman, introduces the Summit Authoring System which includes student tracking and bookmarks plus instructor course management features. It is the first to bring streaming media to a virtual learning environment.
- Research Report 24, September 1986, published from the Computerized Conferencing and Communications Center, New Jersey Institute of Technology: 'The Virtual Classroom: Building the Foundations' Starr Roxanne Hiltz, Project Director, Research Report for the 1985-86 Academic Year, "Tools for the Enhancement and evaluation of a Virtual Classroom' includes chapters on research, software development, implementation issues, evaluation methods, student participation and outcomes, with brief descriptions of online courses offered at NJIT, Upsala College and The New School for Social Research.

=== 1987 ===
- In 1987, NKI Distance Education in Norway starts its first online distance education courses. The courses were provided through EKKO, NKI's self-developed Learning Management System(LMS). The experiences are described in the article NKI Fjernundervisning: Two Decades of Online Sustainability in Morten Flate Paulsen's book Online Education and Learning Management Systems which is available from the author via Campus NooA
- From this year until 1991 several UK groups of researchers associated in one way or another with the Open University, the UK Department for Industry (especially the Alvey programme, the transputer team and the Information Technology Consultancy Unit) and the emerging European Commission DELTA programme, carry out a mass of specification and prototyping work on "educational environments". Projects include the Thought Box; the Learning Systems Reference Model; Portable Educational Tools Environment (joint OU, Harlequin and Chorus Systèmes); and Transputer-Based Communications-oriented Learning System. Among the non-OU co-workers were Chris Webb, Bill Olivier and Oleg Liber, all still active in e-learning. (No useful material left on the current public Web.)
- The Athena Writing Project at MIT publishes "Electronic Classroom: Specification for a user interface"
- 1987, Glenn Jones of Jones Intercable in Denver, Colorado believed he saw a potential goldmine when he created a new system, called Mind Extension University in 1987. Jones created a system where telecourses could be provided across a network to various colleges and at the same time, students could interact with the instructors and each other, by using email, sent over the internet. Jones then began to beam the courses by satellite, so anyone with a satellite dish could watch the classes and if they had a computer and a phone line they could interact with the class.

=== 1988 ===
- Probably the first large-scale use of computer conferencing in distance teaching when the Open University UK launched DT200 Introduction to Information Technology with 1000 students per year. The ur-evaluation by Robin Mason is a good description – see Chapter 9 of Mindweave – Universidade Federal de Mato Grosso do Sul
- Edward Barrett and James Paradis publish a chapter entitled "The Online Environment and In-House Training" in Edward Barrett (Ed.) Text, ConText, and HyperText (1988-MIT Press), that describes Project Athena as an Educational On-Line System (EOS).
- Question Mark (see QuestionMark) introduces a DOS-based Assessment Management System. A Windows-based version was introduced in 1993, and an internet version was introduced in 1995. See Questionmark's website.
- Utilizing colleague Stephen Wolfram's Mathematica computer algebra system, mathematics professors at the University of Illinois, Jerry Uhl and Horacio Porta along with Professor Bill Davis of the Ohio State University, develop Calculus&Mathematica and offer calculus courses at UIUC and OSU in computer labs.
- Peter Copen launches the New York State/Moscow Schools Telecommunications Project, linking 12 schools in New York State with 12 in Moscow in the former Soviet Union to demonstrate that students can learn better through direct interaction online and will become global citizens. This was the pilot project for what later became iEARN (International Education and Resource Network).

=== 1989 ===
- Tim Berners-Lee, then a young British engineer working at CERN in Switzerland, circulated a proposal for an in-house online document sharing system which he described as a "web of notes with links". After the proposal was grudgingly approved by his superiors, he called the new system the World Wide Web.
- Chris Moore, Chief Technology Officer at THINQ Learning Solutions for many years, pioneered the TrainingServer learning management system for Syscom, Inc. Syscom was acquired by THINQ in 2000. THINQ was by Saba in 2005. Chris Moore has recently founded Zeroed-In Technologies.
- Lancaster University (UK) launches the MSc in Information Technology and Learning: now the world's longest continually running Masters programme taught using virtual learning methods (see Goodyear, P (2005) The emergence of a networked learning community: lessons learned from research and practice, in Kearsley, G. (ed) Online learning, Englewood Cliffs NJ: Educational Technology Publications, 113–127.)
- The Calculus&Mathematica support team at the University of Illinois begin offering computerized calculus courses utilizing Mathematica over the internet to High School students in rural Illinois.
- John S. Quarterman published a 700+ page book, "The Matrix: Computer Networks and Conferencing Systems Worldwide" (Digital Press, 1989). This book provided detailed addressing protocols on how different computer networks could connect with each other for the purpose of exchanging information and holding discussions, and network maps of the developing Internet.
- Networked Educational Online System (NEOS) developed and deployed at MIT. The system provided coursework exchange between different roles allowing for grading, annotating, and public discussions. Nick Williams, William Cattey, "The Educational On-Line System", Proceedings of the EUUG Spring Conference, EUUG, (April 1990)
- Scardamalia, M., Bereiter, C., McLean, R. S., Swallow, J., & Woodruff, E. (1989). Computer supported intentional learning environments. Journal of Educational Computing Research, 5, 51–68. Paper discusses CSILE project and related software.
- The first release of Lotus Notes 1.0 is shipped. Release 1.0 includes functionality which is "revolutionary" for the time, including allowing system/server administrators to create a user mailbox, user records in a Name and Address database, and to notarize the user's ID file through dialog boxes. Also includes an electronic mail system with return receipt and notification features, and on-line help, "a feature not offered in many products at this time." Official history of Lotus Notes
- Publication of the book Mindweave: Communication, Computers and Distance Education, edited by Robin Mason and Anthony Kaye (published by Pergamon Press, Oxford, 273p). This was a hugely influential book on computer conferencing on which many of the leading experts of the time collaborated. In addition to descriptions of applications, there were several chapters describing or specifying systems, in particular the Thought Box. The book is available second-hand (e.g. via Amazon) but the full text (no images) is on the web.
- The first public article specifying the Thought Box appears as Chapter 7 of Mindweave, written by Gary Alexander and Ches Lincoln. It is entitled "The thought box: A computer-based communication system to support distance learning". Although the specification is couched in terms of a hardware device linked to a remote mail/resources server the article also describes the prototype work being done in HyperCard, and it could be argued that this software prototype had many of the features of a modern Personal Learning Environment. In fact, over the next few years, the HyperCard route was the way by which the ideas were advanced, eventually appearing in the XT001 online course in the early 1990s and in several other Open University courses.
- The Athena Writing Project at MIT produces this publication: N. Hagan Heller, "Designing a User Interface for the Educational On-line System", Massachusetts Institute of Technology, Boston, MA, May 1989.
- Education 2010 is published. This 83-page booklet (published by Newman Software, ISBN 0-948048-04-2) arose out of an invitational conference at Bangor in July, 1989, with a brief to examine the possible role of IT in Education in the year 2010. With a few notable exceptions such as Stephen Heppell, few of the conference delegates are active now in e-learning – but it makes interesting reading.
- ECCTIS Limited was formed when it successfully completed in a closed tendering exercise for the ECCTIS online (viewdata) courses information service earlier run by the UK Open University. "ECCTIS" is one of the few names from the viewdata era of the 1980s to carry on till this day, even if somewhat changed. ECCTIS has a useful history page.
- Dr. John Sperling and Terri Hedegaard Bishop begin the University of Phoenix Online campus, based in San Francisco, California. It was the first private university venture to deliver complete academic degree programs (Master's and bachelor's degrees) and services to a mass audience, via asynchronous online technologies. This early success is later documented in a paper written by Hedegaard-Bishop and Howard Garten (Professor at University of Dayton, Dayton, Ohio), "The Rise of Computer Conferencing Courses and Online Education: Challenges for Accreditation and Assessment" and published in a collection of Papers on Self-Study and Institutional Improvement by the North Central Association of Colleges and Schools, (1993) 137–145.
- F.C. Prasse and B.T. Hackett present at the 1989 Technology and Innovations in Training and Education (TITE) Conference on an operational distance education prototype fielded in 1987 using off-the-shelf RBBS software and featuring messaging, current issues, a multi-topic asynchronous threaded discussion format, as well as a searchable online reference database. Prasse, F.C. & Hackett, B.T. (1989). Continuing education and problem solving using remote data terminals. In L. Wiekorst (Ed.), Proceedings of the 1989 Conference on Technology and Innovations in Training and Education, pp. 237–246. Atlanta, GA: American Defense Preparedness Association.

== 1990s ==
=== 1991 ===
- In datacloud|Datacloud: Toward a New Theory of Online Work, Johndan Johnson-Eilola describes a specific computer-supported collaboriation space: The Smart Board, which was introduced in 1991. According to Johnson-Eilola, a "Smart Board system provides a 72-inch, rear projection, touchscreen, intelligent whiteboard surface for work" (79). In datacloud|Datacloud, Johnson-Eilola asserts that "[w]e are attempting to understand how users move within information spaces, how users can exist within information spaces rather than merely gaze at them, and how information spaces must be shared with others rather than being private, lived within rather than simply visited" (82). He explains how the Smart Board system offers an information space that allows his students to engage in active collaboration. He makes three distinct claims regarding the functionality of the technology: 1) The Smart Board allows users to work with large amounts of information, 2) It offers an information space that invites active collaboration, 3) The work produced is often "dynamic and contingent" (82).
- Johnson-Eilola further explains that with the Smart Board "…information work becom[es] a bodied experience" (81). Users have the opportunity to engage with—inhabit—the technology by direct manipulation. Moreover, this space allows for more than one user; essentially, it invites multiple users.

=== 1992 ===
- Gyrus Systems, led by owners Robert Dust and Robert Minteer, launch Training Administrator to automate course and schedules, training budgets, resource management, reporting, and mapping training to job function. Training Administrator was one of the first HR products designed for Microsoft Windows. Upon initiation, Training Administrator was used throughout the United States and in 17 other countries.
- Convene International is co-founded by Mr. Jeffrey Stein, Mr. Reda Athanasios and Mr. Jeff Kuhn. Convene provided a communication services via the Internet for affinity groups of different backgrounds. One of it focused area was providing a distance education solutions for churches and seminaries.

=== 1993 ===
- Convene International collaborates with the University of Phoenix to provide the first full collaborative distance education online model. Mr. Reda Athanasios leads the technological efforts. Mr. Tom Bishop of UOP Online establishes the UOP marketing efforts.

=== 1994 ===
- TeleEducation NB, a provincial distance learning network in the Canadian province of New Brunswick implemented a primitive DOS-based learning management system designed by Rory McGreal.
- Convene International start offering its completed Internet online education service to all schools that wished to embark on online distance education.

=== 1995 ===
- Arnold Pizer and Michael Gage at the University of Rochester Department of Mathematics develop WeBWorK (a free Perl-based system for delivering individualized homework problems over the web) for use in mathematics instruction.
- In 1995 Ziff Davis (formerly Logical Operations) in Rochester NY created Ziff Davis University, a web based technology training service. The team that worked on it included Kevin Gilbert and others.
- In 1995 a group at Oregon State University (Bill Bogley, Robby Robson, John Sechrest, John Dorbolo and others) developed InterQuest (a database-driven system that added quizzing, grading, and other functionality to web pages) and CalculusQuest, an online calculus course.
- Steve Molyneux at University of Wolverhampton in the UK develops WOLF (Wolverhampton Online Learning Framework) one of the first e-Learning environments in the UK.
- In 1995 Murray Goldberg at University of British Columbia began looking at the application of web-based systems to education and developed WebCT in early 1996.
- In 1995 The University of Auckland Business School launched CECIL (computer supported learning or CSL) with students enrolled in February 1996. It's the University of Auckland's LMS & still operating.Cecil websiteCecil: The First Web-based LMS
- Jerrold Maddox, at Penn State University, taught a course, Commentary on Art, on the web starting in January 1995. It was the first course taught at a distance using the web.
- The first fully online, for-credit university course was developed in 1994–95, and taught in the Fall 1995 at the University of Waterloo by Professor Paul Beam. It was English 210e (Technical Writing). The technology for the course was built by Jeremy Auger, who later went on to become a co-founder of Desire2Learn (D2L), the learning platform company.
- Neville Gordon-Carroll and Vaughn Taylor at Microsoft launched MOLI - Microsoft Online Institute - an online learning proof of concept built as a result of an intensive research project into the future of technology based learning. The desired outcome was a platform for self-directed learning at any time, from anywhere with content that was dynamically updated and immediately relevant. MOLI was initially developed by Microsoft on the MSN proprietary platform then rapidly migrated to the internet as Microsoft embraced the internet in mid 1995. Microsoft Online Institute was a simple hosted learning platform that was made available to private and public learning institutions to conduct and experiment with their own classrooms, content and instruction model. During this time Microsoft actively evangelized internet based learning to higher education institutions, learning content developers and traditional education companies. Despite initial resistance to this new learning model several companies and institutions used MOLI as an experimental platform before launching their own offerings.

=== 1996 ===
- Jones International University becomes the first accredited fully web based university.
- Gyrus Systems launches Training Wizard and Training Wizard Plus. The Training Wizard product line was released to cater to smaller organizations, while its previous product, Training Administrator was an enterprise level application.
- CourseInfo LLC founded by Dan Cane and Stephen Gilfus at Cornell University. https://news.cornell.edu/stories/1997/10/seniors-company-helps-produce-web-pages-college-courses

Develops the "Interactive Learning Network" ILN 1.5, and installs it at several academic institutions including Cornell University, Yale Medical School and University of Pittsburgh.

=== 1997 ===
- In February 1997, Steven Narmontas, introduced a small group of faculty members of Western New England College to a software system he had worked on as a spare time project. Dubbed "The Manhattan Project", because it was largely developed in secret, the software enabled teachers to post files to a web site for their students to read. The earliest version of "Manhattan" also supported a few discussion groups and private messaging. Latter it will be the LMS "The Manhattan Virtual Classroom"
- Neal Sample and Mark Arnold present "JavaScript for Simulation Education" at the NAU/web.97 conference (Flagstaff, Arizona, 12–15 June 1997). Their paper presents earlier work (pre-1997) on experiences presenting coursework over the Internet. At the same conference, other academics presented their work in the field of e-learning. A copy of the Sample/Arnold paper can be found here:
- Blackboard Inc founded by Michael Chasen and Matt Pitinsky in Washington, DC.

=== 1998 ===
- Ian D. Thompson at the University of Strathclyde creates version one of the SPIDER VLE system for the School of Pharmacy.
- Ian Reid at the University of South Australia creates version one of UniSAnet, its in-house virtual learning environment.
- Coursepackets.com, founded by entrepreneur, and then UT student, Alan Blake, launches in the fall semester at the University of Texas at Austin. The company was the first to provide scanned, online versions of course-packets for students. Coursepackets.com changed its name to CourseNotes.com when it began offering expanded services in early 2000.
- GaTest.com was founded by two teachers, Jay Eckard and Joe Winterscheidt, to prepare students for the Georgia High School Graduation Test (GHSGT). They later added more content in 2002-2003 and became USAtestprep. The website still exists as Progress Learning today

=== 1999 ===
- John Baker (entrepreneur) a student at the University of Waterloo creates version one of Desire2Learn learning system for faculty in engineering.

== 2000s ==
=== 2000 ===
- January, 2000: CourseNotes.com, founded by entrepreneur, and then UT student, Alan Blake, launches in early 2000, with dozens of classes at the University of Texas at Austin. The service was marketed since the summer of 1999, and provides comprehensive professor web sites, including virtually all features offered by Blackboard (i.e., course documents, calendaring, grades, quizzes & surveys, announcements, etc.). The company was later renamed ClassMap and operational until early 2001.
- January 2000: Lamp and Goodwin of Deakin University publish "Using Computer Mediated Communications to Enhance the Teaching of Team Based Project Management" (conference presentation copyright 1999), an evaluation of a trial of FirstClass to teach project management at Deakin in 1998–99. It contains the memorable observation "There were some comments about features which students believed that FirstClass didn't have (eg email, chat sessions on demand) when, in fact, they were available facilities..."University Note also that there are several specifications of pre-2000 versions of FirstClass available (usually as PDF files at university sites) on the web.
- January 2000: [ILIAS], which has been developed at University of Cologne since 1997, has become open source software under the GPL (first release: ILIAS 1.6). Together with developers from other universities in Northrhine-Westfalia the ILIAS team founded the CampusSource initiative to promote the development of open source LMS and other software for teaching at universities.
- April 2000: ePath Learning, established in 1999, launches the first online LMS, ePath Learning ASAP, making it affordable for businesses to create and manage online learning and training. Their vision is to make online learning accessible to everyone. (http://www.epathlearning.com/index.php/epath-about-us/history.html).
- May, 2000: ArsDigita, a Boston Massachusetts-based start-up who developed the Arsdigita Community System since their inception in 1997 deploys Caltech Portals at my.caltech.edu wwwy.Caltech.edu/

Later that year in October 2000, deploy the ArsDigita Community Education System (ACES) at MIT Sloan School. The system is called Sloanspace. The ArsDigita Community System as well as ACES in the next few years grow to OpenACS and .LRN

- May 1, 2000: Randy Graebner's master's thesis from MIT is published, Online Education Through Shared Resources.
- Mid June, Reda Athanasios, President of Convene International leaves the company to form Learning Technology Partners (which later buys Convene). Now that the Virtual classroom idea is well established, what is needed next is to build all the other supporting technologies to turn the Virtual Classroom to a Virtual Campus with SMS and e-commerce support, he claims. Learning Technology Partners seeks to build technologies to support the Virtual Classroom.
- June 30, 2000: Blackboard Inc. file a patent application relating to "Internet-based education support systems and methods". An international patent application is filed on the same date. The applications claim priority from a provisional patent application filed June 30, 1999. A US patent is granted in 2006 (See below) and patent applications in Europe, Canada, Mexico and Australia are also pursued from the WO application.
- Blackboard Inc. acquires MadDuck Technologies LLC, developers of "Web Course in a Box".
- ETUDES 2.5 is demonstrated in March at TechEd 2000 in Palm Springs, California. At or prior to this release, ETUDES included a number of features of VLEs, including course and role based access via login, electronic assignment submission, online assessment, and synchronous and asynchronous communications. The system is in use by a number of community colleges in California, including Foothill, Miracosta, and Las Positas.
- "The Political Economy of Online Education" (Onrain Kyouiku no Seijikeizaigaku) by Kimura Tadamasa was published in May, with the rubric "this book examines the role of secondary education in the new information society, from a variety of perspectivies – sociology, psychology, and human resource management – using concrete examples of online education in educational environments." ISBN 4-7571-4017-7. NTT publishing. Tokyo. (Japanese).
- The MIT Sloan School of Management launches the first production version of ACES 3.4 with a pilot of 8 Fall 2000 classes.
- Northern Virginia Community College's Extended Learning Institute begins using Blackboard after having previously used a variety of other products for Internet-based course delivery, including Lotus Notes (1995), FirstClass (1996–1999), Serf (1997–1999), and Allaire Forums (1999ff.) for its engineering degree program and other courses; NVCC also used WebBoard (1999) and Web Course in a Box (1998), prior to beginning its use of Blackboard.
- In fall 2000 the open source LMS OLAT developed at University of Zurich won the MeDiDa-Prix for its paedagogical concept. It was optimized to support a blended learning concept.
- In May 2000, HEFCE, the Higher Education Funding Council for (universities in) England, commissions a comparative analysis of the main VLEs, as part of a series of studies for the imminent UK e-University. Over 40 specially created vendor submissions mostly delivered by 17 June 2000 are analysed by a team led by Paul Bacsich. A companion study analysed what were then called Learning Administration Systems, in a team comprising Christopher Dean, Oleg Liber, Sandy Britain and Bill Olivier. Final reports were delivered in September 2000.
- Webster & Associates / Infosentials Ltd launches learningfast.com in first half of year. Complete course based assessment, with separate user and administrator logins. Users, on login, are provided with a list of courses that matches their subscription level. Subsequently, sold to Monash University.
- In July, 2000, CyberLearning Labs, Inc. is founded. Its primary product, the ANGEL Learning Management System (LMS) evolved from research at Indiana University-Purdue University Indianapolis (IUPUI). The company will later change its name to ANGEL Learning, Inc.
- A Manual for Students in Web-Based Courses: What do you do now that they have gone to the Web? was published online by Kent Norman at the University of Maryland, College Park, Laboratory for Automation Psychology.
- The Claroline project was initiated in 2000 at the Catholic University of Louvain (Belgium) by Thomas De Praetere and was financially supported by the Louvain Foundation. Developed from teachers to teachers, Claroline is built over sound paedagogical principles allowing a large variety of paedagogical setup including widening of traditional classroom and online collaborative learning.
- University of Phoenix as the largest and the leading online distance education provider has its very successful IPO as the world first for profit online school.

=== 2001 ===
- Technological Fluency Institute releases CAT1 (Computer Assessment and Tutorial) which assesses a person's technical abilities and offers help tutorials for participants.
- CourseWork.Version I (CW), a full-featured course management system, was developed at Stanford University's Academic Computing. CW supported multiple courses allowing multiple roles for users. CW's consisted of a set of tools for authoring and distributing course websites that incluced: a course homepage, announcements, syllabus, schedule, course materials, assignments (based on a 1998 version of CW), gradebook and assync discussion. This version was initially developed as part of the Open Knowledge Initiative, partially funded by the Andrew W. Mellon Foundation.
- Microsoft releases Microsoft Encarta Class Server (See Press Release)
- The Bodington system released as open source by the University of Leeds, UK
- Moodle is published via CVS by Martin Dougiamas to early testers The announcement is here.
- LON-CAPA is first used in courses at Michigan State University.
- version 2.0 of COSE is launched after further funding from the Jisc
- Murray Goldberg (founder of WebCT) and others start a company called Silicon Chalk. Silicon Chalk builds software for the classroom to be used in laptop learning environments. Examples of features include presentation and audio beaming to student laptops, student note taking, student polling, student questions, control of student applications, recording of entire lecture experience for archiving, searching and later replay, etc. Silicon Chalk gains a dedicated usership of approximately 70 institutions but never achieves profitability. It is sold to Horizon Wimba in 2005.
- The MIT Sloan School of Management adopts ACES 3.4 (internally named SloanSpace) as their course management system.
- Brandon Hall publishes an article in ASTD's "Learning Circuits", entitled LMS 2001. It lists 59 learning management systems available that year.
- Thinking Cap, the first XML LMS / LCMS launched. Separation of content from presentation allows for single source creation of training content.
- ILIAS 2.0 released in August.
- PTT launches the first commercial version of its Trainee Records Management System (TRMS).
- August 2001: the Pedagogy Group of the UK e-University (UKeU) started work on development of what eventually became (in 2003) the UKeU learning environment. An "e-University Functional Model" was created in October 2001 but specification work continued well into 2002. See the UKeU Overview, especially Section 3, for a description of the early days of UKeU.
- December 2001: The open-source course management system spotter is released.

=== 2002 ===
- Microsoft release Class Server 3.0 on June 6 Press release
- ATutor first public open source release in December ATutor Release News
- Moodle version 1.0 is released in August
- Fle3 version 1.0 released in February – the first open source version of FLE software
- The MIT Sloan School of Management migrates ACES to OpenACS 4.0, thereby creating the first instance of .LRN (1.0).
- The Centre for Applied Research in Educational Technologies at the University of Cambridge deploys CamCommunities, an open-source community system (OpenACS) based on .LRN, for use on campus.Sakai VRE for Education Research, a project funded by the JISC's.
- In July, Reda Athanasios of Learning Technology Partners buys his old company Convene and instantly gains two data centers and IZIO the Learning Platform developed in Stanford and purchased later by Convene.
- Start of the OLAT rebuilt project. The goal of the project was to rebuild the LAMP-based LMS on a scalable, safe and fast Java EE-based architecture that supports campus-wide e-learning.
- ILIAS open source team starts to redesign the system and to develop ILIAS 3.
- November 2002: OpenText announces the acquisition of Centrinity, the then-owners of FirstClass – see
- December 2002: ACODE, the Australasian Council on Open, Distance and E-Learning, continues under a new name the work of a series of earlier organisations originating with NCODE in 1993. See the history of ACODE.

=== 2003 ===
- LON-CAPA version 1.0 released in August (in use at 12 universities, 2 community colleges and 8 high schools)
- December 2003: Serco acquires Teknical, the VLE company spun out of the University of Lincoln.
- Early in the year WebCT announces over 6 million students users and 40,000 instructor users teaching 150,000 courses per year at 1,350 institutions in 55 countries.
- LogiCampus released its first open source edition in November 2003 on sourceforge.net. LogiCampus news release archive

=== 2004 ===
- The Sakai Project founded, promising to develop an open source Collaboration and Learning Environment for the needs of higher education.
- OLAT 3.0 released. This is the first OLAT release that is entirely written in Java as a result of the OLAT rebuild project initiated in 2002.
- First stable ILIAS 3 release published in June..
- In July ILIAS is certified officially by ADL CO-Lab as SCORM 1.2 compliant. ILIAS is the first free software LMS that reaches the maximum conformance level LMS-RTE3.
- University of South Africa (Unisa) and Technikon South Africa (TSA) merged on 1 January 2004. The functionality of their two in-house developed CMSs (Unisa SOL and TSA COOL) was combined into a new system called "myUnisa" . myUnisa is built within the Sakai framework. The new myUnisa infrastructure was launched on 9 January 2006. By August 2006 myUnisa was one of the largest installs of Sakai with more than 110 000 students.
- October: Murray Goldberg, the inventor of WebCT, and still an adjunct professor at the University of British Columbia, wins this year's EnCana Principal Award from the Ernest C. Manning Awards Foundation. The award, with a cash prize of $100,000, is given each year to a Canadian innovator. The press release perhaps comes closest to being a brief official history of WebCT from the university point of view.* Roger Boshier releases an irreverent history of e-learning in British Columbia, covering WebCT and many lesser-known developments. The file date is 2004 but the chronology stops just before 2000. See A Chronology of Technological Triumph, Zealotry and Utopianism in B.C. Education. An earlier (1999) version of this with the title addition of Leaping Fords and Conquering Mountains is also available.
- The American National Standards Institute, International Committee for Information Technology Standards (ANSI/INCITS) adopts the Sandhu, Ferraiolo, Kuhn RBAC (Role-Based Access Control) NIST "unified model" proposal as an industry consensus standard (INCITS 359:2004). A page is prepared (date uncertain) detailing the history of Role-Based Access Control from the Ferrailo and Kuhn paper in 1992 up to the date of the standard.
- eLML started as a spin-off from the Gitta project.

=== 2005 ===
- Microsoft release Microsoft Class Server 4.0 on 27 January (See Press release).
- OLAT 4.0 was introduced with many new features like the integration of XMPP, RSS, SCORM and an extension framework that allows adding code by configuration and without the need to patch the original code set.
- January 2005: EADTU – the European Association of Distance Teaching Universities – launches the "E-xcellence" project, with the support of the eLearning Programme of the European Commission (DG Education and Culture), to set a standard for quality in e-learning. The project is a cooperation between 13 "significant partners" in the European scene of higher education e-learning together with quality assessment and accreditation.
- March 2005: The New Zealand Ministry of Education authorises release of a report describing (in anonymised terms) the benchmarking of e-learning, covering most university-level institutions in the country. The Report on the E-Learning Maturity Model Evaluation of the New Zealand Tertiary Sector weighs in at a hefty 12 MB.
- April 28, 2005: Blackboard are granted AU 780938B based on their international patent application filed in 2000. The granted claims are similar to the claims later granted in the US (See below).
- June 2005: Janice Smith (Jan Smith) publishes "From flowers to palms: 40 years of policy for online learning" [in the UK], ALT-J, Research in Learning Technology, vol. 13 no. 2 pp. 93–108 – with a particularly useful chronology on page 95. As the ALT-J editor Jane Seale notes, "the purpose of the review is to make sense of the current position in which the field finds itself, and to highlight lessons that can be learned from the implementation of previous policies".
- July 2005: Dorian James Rutter finishes a long-awaited PhD thesis From Diversity to Convergence: British Computer Networks and the Internet, 1970-1995 (prelims+464 pages). This covers in particular the early history of viewdata and online services with a whole chapter on Prestel. (http://wrap.warwick.ac.uk/1197/)
- July 2005: The European Foundation for Quality in eLearning is launched, initially funded by the EU Triangle project.
- September 2005: The Higher Education Academy announced the UK Higher Education e-Learning Benchmarking Exercise and Pathfinder Programme during a joint Academy/Jisc session at ALT-C 2005. The initial announcement was followed by a call to the sector for Expressions of Interest to participate in the e-learning benchmarking exercise (e-benchmarking). A consultative Town Meeting was also held at the Academy, York in November 2005. (The pilot phase of the e-Learning Benchmarking Exercise commenced in January 2006.)
- October 13, 2005: Blackboard files patent #7,493,396, requiring that a single user be allowed to have multiple roles, and that the list of course links provided after login vary depending on the user's role for each course.
- O'Reilly Media purchases Useractive, inc. and starts O'Reilly Learning (which eventually become The O'Reilly School of Technology), which creates online learning courses in programming and system administration skills. This enterprise is the first full-scale effort to expand the use of the useractive constructivist model of learning on the internet.
- NACON Consulting, LLC. pioneers its distance education system, "VirtualOnDemand ", designed to train users on real software using virtual machines, with the only user component needed being a web browser. The Army initiates a pilot program and uses this system to train IT support personnel in various network security software. NACON also releases a stand-alone virtual training appliance.
- Boston University launches the first online doctoral program in music education, which within two years admits nearly 350 students.
- KEWL.nextgen started up in PHP.

=== 2006 ===
- The Virtual Learning Environment SCOLASTANCE is now available in its English version VLE Scolastance
- 17 January 2006: Blackboard is granted US 6988138 relating to "Internet-based education support systems" claiming priority from its provisional patent application of 30 June 1999 (among others). The claims require that a series of educational courses stored on a server be accessible by different users from different computers. Users can access multiple courses and can have different access privileges for files relating to each course based on course-specific roles of student, instructor, and/or administrator.
- 14 February 2006: Indiana University awarded the service mark Oncourse from the United States Patent and Trademark Office (Reg. No. 3,058,558). FOR: EDUCATIONAL SERVICES, NAMELY, PROVIDING AN ONLINE COURSE MANAGEMENT SYSTEM FOR TEACHERS AND STUDENTS, IN CLASS 41 (U.S. CLS. 100, 101, AND 107). FIRST USE: 1-3-1998; IN COMMERCE 1-3-1998.
- 28 February 2006: Merger of WebCT into the Blackboard company. Both WebCT and Blackboard VLEs continue to exist as separate software. (See press release)
- 26 July 2006: Blackboard files a complaint for patent infringement against Desire2Learn under its US patent. Blackboard tells the Chronicle of Higher Ed. that it will not go after Moodle and Sakai.
- August: WBTSystems, which has been an independent VLE developer in Ireland since 1994, is acquired by
- October: OLAT 5.0 has been released which brings a comprehensive full text search service to the systems core. The addition of a calendar and wiki component stresses the emphasis of a collaborative environment. AJAX and web 2.0 technologies are controllable by users.
- On August 9, 2006, a complaint was filed against Blackboard by Portaschool of Atlanta, GA in the United States District Court of the Northern District of Georgia for deceptive business practices, and knowingly and willingly misrepresenting themselves in a patent application.

=== 2007 ===
- On January 7, Microsoft released the SharePoint Learning Kit. The software is SCORM 2004 certified and is used in conjunction with Microsoft Office SharePoint Server to provide LMS functionality.
- On January 25, it was announced that the Software Freedom Law Center was successful in its request that the United States Patent and Trademark Office re-examine the e-learning patent owned by Blackboard Inc. The request was filed in November 2006 on the behalf of Sakai, Moodle, and ATutor. The Patent Office found that prior art cited in SFLC's request raises "a substantial new question of patentability" regarding all 44 claims of Blackboard's patent. Groklaw, a website that tracks legal issues generally related to open-source software, has the press release: Groklaw.org
- February 1, Blackboard announced via press release "The Blackboard Patent Pledge". In this pledge to the open source and do-it-yourself course management community, the company vows to forever refrain from asserting its patent rights against open-source developers, except where it is deemed necessary.
- February: Technological Fluency Institute releases a Windows XP version of its online prescriptive diagnostic performance based CAT1 program.
- March 7: The OLAT team releases OLAT 5.1 which has an emphasis on consolidation of features and bugfixing. Besides this a new glossary function has been added and accessibility has been improved.
- July: Michigan Virtual University launches a learning management system from Meridian Knowledge Solutions to deliver training to 150,000 Michigan public-school teachers and administrators and foster collaboration among these learners via online collaboration spaces.
- August: The MIT Sloan School of Management replaces ACES (internally named SloanSpace) with Stellar as its course management system and Microsoft SharePoint to manage administrative content. At the 2007 MIT Sloan Talent Show, an MBA student protests SloanSpace with a song titled "I Can't Find It In SloanSpace" to the tune of Garth Brooks' "Friends in Low Places".
- September: xTrain LLP. launches first of its kind, (ODT) On Demand Training on the Internet. Users have access to high quality video training with social network communities, leading experts and portfolio reviews and certifications.
- September: Epignosis releases its web2.0 virtual learning environment (eFront) as Open-Source software.
- October 18: Controlearning s.a. and ocitel s.a. designed and developed Campus VirtualOnline, (CVO), a platform where mixed e-learning content, e-books, e-money, e-docs, e-talents is found in a single place.

=== 2009 ===
- August: Schoology was launched.

== 2010s ==
=== 2010 ===
- September 28, 2010: Public major release of OLAT 7. New features included the implementation of important standards like REST API, IMS Global Basic LTI, IMS QTI 2.1
- Large LMS providers start to dive into the talent management systems market, possibly starting a global tendency to do more with the information about LMS users

=== 2012 ===
- February 2012: Instructure launched Canvas K–12.

=== 2014 ===
- August 12, 2014: Google launched Google Classroom.

== See also ==
- E-Learning
- History of automated adaptive instruction in computer applications
- History of personal learning environments
