= Manning Innovation Awards =

Canadian annual innovation awards

The Manning Innovation Awards are awarded by the Ernest C. Manning Awards Foundation to recognize and encourage innovation in Canada. By means of a nomination, Canadian resident citizens, who have demonstrated recent innovative talent in developing and successfully marketing a new concept, process or procedure, may be eligible for a Principal Award ($100,000), Award of Distinction ($25,000), or Innovation Award (2 at $10,000).

The Manning Innovation Awards have been granted since 1982. The awards were the idea of David Mitchell, former CEO of Alberta Energy Company (a predecessor of the company now called Encana). The awards are named for former Alberta Premier Ernest Manning. As of 2012, almost 250 people have received Manning Awards and almost $4,500,000 has been awarded Since 1992, the foundation has also handed out the Young Canadian Innovation Awards, honoring exceptional student projects from the Canada-Wide Science Fair.

The first winner of the Principal Award in 1982 was Phil Gold for his discovery of carcinoembryonic antigen, now widely used for cancer blood testing. Other notable winners include cardiology researcher Adolfo J. de Bold (1986) for his discovery of the heart hormone atrial natriuretic peptide (ANP); endocrinologist Jean Dussault (1988) for developing a test for congenital hypothyroidism; biologist Yoshio Masui (1990) for work on cell division; physicist Kenneth O. Hill (1995) for his work on photosensitivity in optical fiber; engineer James McEwen (1997), inventor of the microprocessor-controlled automatic tourniquet system for surgeries; and educational technologist Murray Goldberg (2004) for his development of the WebCT course management system.

== The Young Canadian Award Program ==
The Young Canadian Program, introduced in 1992, recognizes eight innovative projects selected by a team of judges at the annual Canada-Wide Science Fair. Each project receives $500, which is presented at the Science Fair award ceremonies. A further judging process then selects four projects from the eight to receive $4,000 Manning Young Canadian Innovation Awards at the annual awards dinner.
