= Don Cassel =

Don Cassel (born April 4, 1942) is the author/coauthor of 60 US/Canadian college textbooks and was a Humber College professor for 30 years, responsible for developing the college's first Computer Programming curriculum.

== Career ==
Cassel was a Professor of Information Technology at Humber College in Toronto, Ontario from 1968 to 1998. In 1968, after arriving at Humber from IBM, he developed the college's first Computer Programming program, which is still part of the curriculum. During this time he specialized in computer programming and application software courses. He was a founding member of the Information Systems department in 1968 where he was department head for 10 years.

During his tenure at Humber Cassel developed numerous courses and was active in curriculum development for the School of Business and later for the School of Information Technology. He developed one of the first online interactive courses at Humber for Microsoft Access using WebCT. WebCT became a significant tool for developing and delivering distance learning for the college.

Cassel was a computer programmer and system analyst with IBM Canada from 1961 to 1968. He received an undergraduate degree in Computer Science from York University in 1975 and was accepted into the Ontario Institute for Studies in Education at the University of Toronto for a Master of Education program, completing the first year of the two-year program. At this point writing college textbooks began to require his full attention.

In 1972 his first book, Programming Language One, was published by Reston Publishing Company of Reston, Virginia, a subsidiary of Prentice Hall Inc. Thus began a long period of textbook writing for college programs across North America.

== Publications ==
- Canadian Internet Handbook - Educational Edition, Prentice Hall Canada, 1999, coauthored with Jim Carroll and Rick Broadhead.
- Surfing for Success in Business and Economics. Prentice Hall Canada, 1999 coauthored with Andrew T. Stull
- Canadian Internet Handbook - Educational Edition, Prentice Hall Canada, 1998, coauthored with Jim Carroll and Rick Broadhead.
- Internet Handbook - U.S. Edition, Prentice Hall Canada, 1997, coauthored with Jim Carroll and Rick Broadhead.
- Canadian Internet Handbook - Educational Edition, Prentice Hall Canada, 1997, coauthored with Jim Carroll and Rick Broadhead.
- Computing Essentials - Introducing Visual Basic 4 for Windows 95, Prentice Hall, Inc. 1996
- Computing Essentials - Introducing Microsoft Access for Windows 95, Prentice Hall, Inc. 1996
- Computing Essentials - Introducing Microsoft Excel for Windows 95, Prentice Hall, Inc. 1996
- Computing Essentials - Introducing Microsoft Word for Windows 95, Prentice Hall, Inc. 1996
- Computing Essentials - Introducing Windows 95, Prentice Hall, Inc. 1996
- Canadian Internet Handbook - Educational Edition, Prentice Hall Canada, 1995, coauthored with Jim Carroll and Rick Broadhead.
- Source 1 - Computing Essentials, Microsoft Excel 5, Prentice Hall, Inc 1995.
- Source 1 - Computing Essentials, Microsoft Word 6, Prentice Hall, Inc 1995.
- Source 1 - Computing Essentials, QBASIC, Prentice Hall, Inc 1995, coauthored with Sherry Newell.
- Source 1 - Computing Essentials, DOS 6, Prentice Hall, Inc 1995.
- Source 1 - Computing Essentials, Microsoft Excel 4.0, Prentice Hall, Inc. 1993, coauthored with Sherry Newell.
- Source 1 - Computing Essentials, dBASE IV Release 1.1, Prentice Hall, Inc. 1993
- Source 1 - Computing Essentials, dBASE III Plus, Prentice Hall, Inc. 1993
- Source 1 - Computing Essentials, Quattro Pro 3.0, Prentice Hall, Inc. 1993
- Source 1 - Computing Essentials, Quattro 1.01, Prentice Hall, Inc. 1993
- Source 1 - Computing Essentials, Lotus 1-2-3 Release 2.3, Prentice Hall, Inc. 1993
- Source 1 - Computing Essentials, Lotus 1-2-3 Release 2.2, Prentice Hall, Inc. 1993
- Source 1 - Computing Essentials, WordPerfect 5.1, Prentice Hall, Inc. 1993
- Source 1 - Computing Essentials, WordPerfect 4.2, Prentice Hall, Inc. 1993
- Source 1 - Computing Essentials, PC DOS/MS-DOS, Prentice Hall, Inc. 1993
- Source 1 - Computing Essentials, DOS 5.0, Prentice Hall, Inc. 1993
- Using DOS, WordPerfect 5.1, Lotus 1-2-3 Release 2.2, and dBASE III Plus, Prentice Hall Inc. 1992.
- Learning Lotus 1-2-3 Releases 2.3 and 2.4, Prentice Hall Canada, Inc. 1992.
- Learning Lotus 1-2-3 Release 2.2, Prentice Hall Canada, Inc. 1991.
- Understanding Computers, Prentice Hall, Inc. 1990
- Learning DOS, WordPerfect 5.0, Lotus 1-2-3 2.2, dBASE III Plus Prentice Hall Inc. 1990
- Learning DOS, WordPerfect 4.2, Lotus 1-2-3/TWIN, dBASE III Plus Prentice Hall Inc. 1990
- Advanced Structured COBOL and Program Design, International Edition, Prentice-Hall Inc. 1987
- Advanced Structured COBOL and Program Design, Prentice-Hall Inc. 1987
- Introduction to Structured COBOL and Program Design, Prentice-Hall Inc. 1987
- WATCOM BASIC Made Easy, Prentice-Hall Canada, 1986
- WordStar 3.3 Simplified, Prentice-Hall Inc., 1984
- Lotus 1,2,3 Simplified for the IBM Personal Computer, Prentice-Hall Inc., 1985–86
- dBASE II Simplified for the IBM Personal Computer, Prentice-Hall Inc., 1985
- BASIC and Problem Solving Made Easy, Reston, 1985
- BASIC Programming for the Commodore PLUS/4 and Commodore 16 Wm. C. Brown, 1985
- Commodore 64 Graphics, Sound and Music, Wm.C. Brown, 1985
- Introduction to Computers and Information Processing - 2nd Edition, Reston 1985 - with Martin Jackson
- BASIC Made Easy 2nd Edition, Reston, 1985 - coauthored with Richard Swanson
- EasyWriter Simplified for the IBM Personal Computer, Prentice-Hall Inc., 1984
- WordStar Simplified for the IBM Personal Computer, Prentice-Hall Inc., 1984
- Computers Made Easy, Reston, 1984
- BASIC Programming for the Commodore 64, Wm.C. Brown, 1984
- BASIC Programming for the Commodore VIC-20, Wm.C. Brown, 1984
- BASIC 4.0 Programming for the PET/CBM, Wm.C. Brown, 1983
- FORTRAN Made Easy, Reston, 1983 - coauthored with Richard Swanson
- An Introduction to Microcomputers - Audio/Visual Presentation, Prentice-Hall Media, 1983
- The Structured Alternative: An Introduction to Program Design, Coding, Style, Debugging and Testing, Reston, 1983
- Introduction to Computers and Information Processing - BASIC, COBOL, FORTRAN, Pascal, Reston 1981 - coauthored with Martin Jackson
- Introduction to Computers and Information Processing - Language Free Edition, Reston 1981 - coauthored with Martin Jackson
- BASIC Made Easy, Reston, 1980 - coauthored with Richard Swanson
- Introduction to Computers and Information Processing, Reston, 1980 - coauthored with Martin Jackson
- PL/I: A Structured Approach, Reston, 1978
- BASIC Programming in Real Time, Reston, 1975
- Programming Language One, Reston, 1972
