= Michigan Virtual High School =

Information
- Established: 2000; 26 years ago
- Affiliation: Michigan Virtual University
- Website: michiganvirtual.org/students/

The Michigan Virtual High School is a program funded by the Michigan legislature in July, 2000. It is run by the Michigan Virtual University, in the US State of Michigan.

== Criticism ==
The layout of Michigan Virtual High School has often been called confusing by students.

== See also ==
- e-learning
