= CYSJ =

CYSJ may refer to:

- Canadian Young Scientist Journal
- Saint John Airport, New Brunswick, Canada, ICAO code CYSJ
