= Alex Deans =

Canadian-British inventor

Alexander Deans
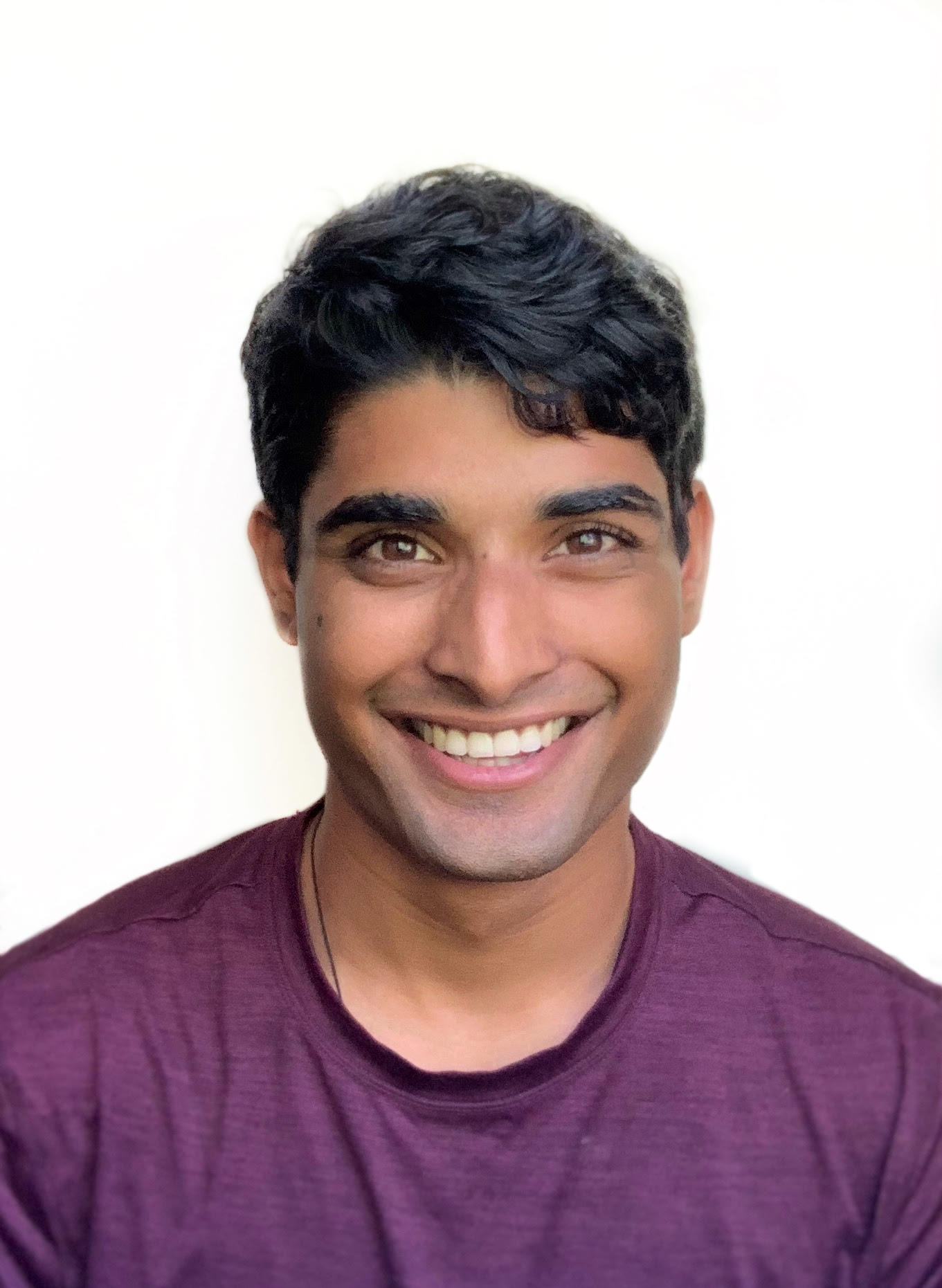
- Born: Alexander Matthew Deans; May 1, 1997 (age 29); Windsor, Ontario, Canada
- Education: Académie Ste. Cécile International School, McGill University
- Occupations: Inventor, Engineer, Physician, Public Speaker
- Years active: 2010–present
- Known for: iAid, Visual Arts
- Website: www.alexdeans.com

Alexander Deans (born May 1, 1997) is a Canadian-British inventor, engineer, and physician. He became Her Majesty Queen Elizabeth II's Youth Leader for Canada at Buckingham Palace. At age 12, he created the "iAid", a navigation device for the blind which won the Canada-Wide Science Fair in the intermediate category and several awards at the 2014 Intel International Science and Engineering Fair.

Deans was one of twelve Canadians named on Maclean's magazine's list of Future Leaders under 25. and accepted naming rights to a minor planet from MIT Lincoln Laboratory. Deans was a speaker on the WE Day North American tour for 200,000 youth alongside Nick Jonas and Queen Noor of Jordan.

== Early life ==
Alexander Matthew Deans was born on May 1, 1997, in Windsor, Ontario, Canada to Robin Deans and Joan Deans. He has an older sister Nicola, and a younger brother, Marcus. Alex's father spoke of his childhood that he "was never really pushed to achieve in academics or competition. Instead, from a very young age, he was allowed to go out, play, and find and make things on his own". Deans was raised in Windsor, Ontario, and attended Académie Ste Cécile International School in South Windsor for primary and secondary school. He speaks English and French.

In 2010, Deans competed at the Canada-Wide Science Fair in Peterborough, Ontario with a project entitled "Saline Aqua Genesis. The innovation used a salt gradient solar pond to drive a generator for electricity production and distilled water for purification purposes in developing countries, but was unsuccessful at the fair.

== Inventions ==
=== iAid ===
Deans credits an encounter he had at age 12 with a visually impaired woman as his inspiration to create iAid. He noticed that she was struggling to cross the street and "asked if she needed any help and realized that she was visually impaired. I saw that she didn't have any independence and couldn't navigate well." Deans taught himself to code and aimed to mimic bat echolocation, remarking that "nature is an incredible innovator". At a competition in Charlottetown, Deans demonstrated the iBELT. The device used echolocation-like technology to map the user's environment and plan paths to destinations, directing visually-impaired users through audible feedback.

Deans' refinement of the device, which he renamed "iAid", was presented in Lethbridge in 2013. The reworked model incorporated GPS planning, outdoor navigation aids, and tactile feedback through use of an innovative joystick. The device won Deans both the fair and funding from corporations including Youth Science Canada and BlackBerry.

iAid utilizes ultrasonic scanning capabilities to compile a map of the user's surroundings and identify obstacles up to 3.5 meters away. The device directs the user through an intuitive hand-held joystick which swivels automatically to indicate directions to destinations. Distances to destinations are relayed via a tilt bracket in the joystick. Outdoors, the user can make use of iAid's Bluetooth pairing capabilities with cell phones. iAid then avails of Google Maps, compass, GPS, and cloud services to plan pedestrian routes and store them for future reference. Testing was instituted with groups from the Canadian National Institute for the Blind and the Foundation Fighting Blindness.

=== VP: Virtual Passenger/ "Call Me Out" ===
In early 2017, Deans started working with McCann Erickson and Chevrolet to create a new technology, VP, to stop teens from texting and driving. VP (Virtual Passenger) brings celebrities and friends into the automobile via Chevrolet's existing MyLink onboard system when the driver receives a text. The system subsequently analyzes driving and texting habits. Virtual Passenger debuted at the Cannes Lions International Festival of Creativity in June 2017. The technology was renamed to "Call Me Out" prior to release in August 2018.

== Recognition ==
Deans' recognition began in early 2014 when he was one of twelve named as a "Future Leader under 25" by Maclean's magazine, described as an "elite group of young people who are outstanding in their fields." His work was recognized by Governor General David Johnston in a speech at the Milken Institute Global Conference Canadian CEO Dinner in Los Angeles, California. Later that year, Deans won second prize at the Intel International Science and Engineering Fair in Los Angeles, California. The Lincoln Laboratory at MIT offered him naming rights to a minor planet at 16 years old. The iAid was named as one of the "Top 50 Ideas Worldwide for Technology in Health, Energy, and Medicine" by the Organization of American States.

iAid began exhibiting at the Ontario Science Centre in the Weston Family Innovation Centre. Deans became Royal Bank of Canada's official ambassador for its ChangeAgents program, partnering with the band Hedley to promote the project. Starting in 2015, Deans joined the WE Day stadium tour alongside Demi Lovato and Prime Minister Justin Trudeau, speaking to 200,000 youth, starting at the Scotiabank Arena. In 2017, Deans partnered with ACCO Brands and MeadWestvaco for a digital campaign with Five Star to promote creativity.

From 2018 to 2023, he has spoken publicly about developing leadership. He met with Prince Harry and John Major at 10 Downing Street around developing the next generation of leaders. He later gave TEDx talks in Monte Carlo and Frankfurt, among other European cities.

== Other work ==
Deans was awarded a Schulich Leader Scholarship at McGill University and graduated in 2019 with a Bachelor of Chemical Engineering. He earned a Doctor of Medicine at the University of Western Ontario in 2023 and entered surgical training at Dalhousie University in Ophthalmology.

Deans has been an alpine skier since age 2. In 2011, he was selected to compete for Team Canada at the International Children's Games, organized by the International Olympic Committee.

Deans is known to be an avid artist, frequently referencing portraiture as a source of his creativity. While finger-painting a portrait of Steve McCurry's Afghan Girl, he realized how sensitive his hands were, which influenced the joystick component of iAid, as the feedback mechanism is primarily haptic feedback to the hands. Deans has displayed his portraiture in television and news interviews, as well as public speaking engagements.
