= ATutor =

Open source web-based application

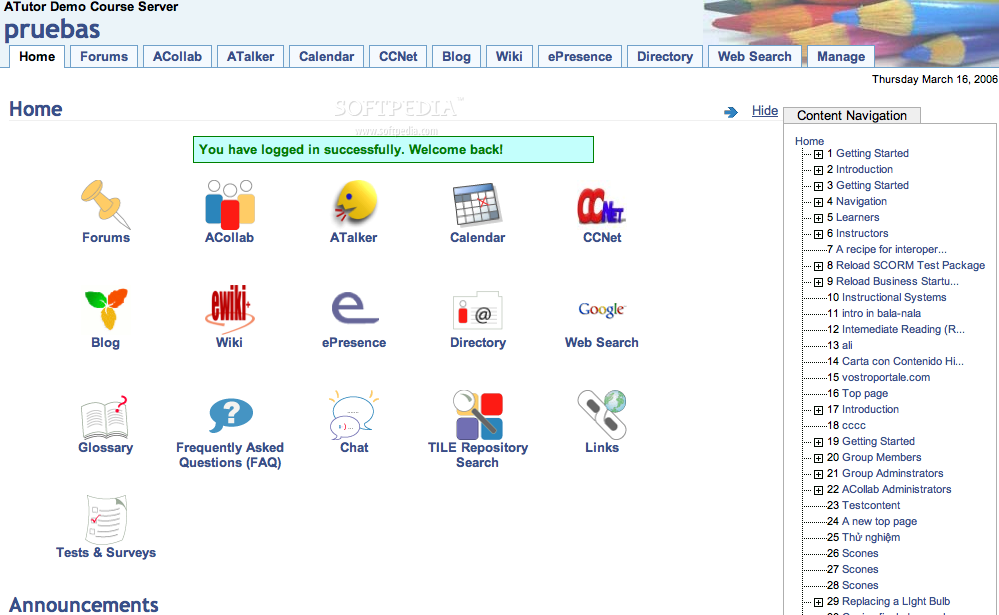
- ATutor course home page
- Developers: Inclusive Design Research Centre, OCAD University, ATutorSpaces
- Stable release: 2.2.4 / 2018-06-20[±]
- Written in: PHP
- Operating system: Cross-platform
- Type: Learning Management System
- License: GPL
- Website: https://atutor.github.io

ATutor is an open source web-based learning management system (LMS).

== Use ==
ATutor is used in various contexts, including online course management, continuing professional development for teachers, career development, and academic research. The software is cited as unique for its accessibility features, (useful to visually impaired and disabled learners); and for its suitability for educational use according to software evaluation criteria established by The American Society for Training and Development (ASTD). ATutor is used internationally and has been translated into over fifteen languages with support for over forty additional language modules currently under development.

== Accessibility ==
ATutor is the first LCMS to comply completely with the accessibility specifications of W3C WCAG 1.0 at the AA+ level, allowing the access to all the included content of the system at all levels of user-privilege, including administrator accounts. Its conformity with XHTML 1.0 is intended to ensure that ATutor is presented and displayed consistently in any compatible technology.

ATutor's developers assert that it is the only fully accessible LCMS software on the market, including for-fee and closed source software. This aspect of ATutor has been affirmed in at least one University-published review of the software. ATutor is also cited in numerous technical reviews and scholarly articles; and many third-party extensions have been developed and distributed for use with the software.

== Background ==
ATutor was first released in late 2002. It came in response to two studies conducted by the developer in the years prior that looked at the accessibility of online learning systems to people with disabilities. Results of the studies showed none of the popular Learning Management Systems at the time even provided minimal conformance with accessibility guidelines. At the time a blind person for instance, could not participate fully in online courses.

=== Accessibility features ===
Two, of many, accessibility features in the system are text alternatives for all visual elements, and keyboard access to all elements of the program. With these features, a blind person can listen to the entire interface of the system with the help of a screen reader, and he or she can access the system without needing a mouse. These features also allow ATutor to adapt to a wide variety of technologies including cell phones, personal data assistants (PDAs), and text-based Web browsers, to name a few.

ATutor includes a content authoring tool that prompts content developers to create accessible learning materials. Such prompts encourage authors to add a text alternatives if they forget to include one when adding an image, for instance. The authoring tool also includes a Web service that evaluates the accessibility of authored content against various international standards. In addition to creating accessible content, the tool is itself accessible, allowing a blind user to create content themselves.

=== Adaptability features ===
ATutor is also designed for adaptability to any of several teaching and learning scenarios. There are four main areas that reflect this design principle: themes, privileges, tool modules, and groups.

The ATutor theme system allows administrators to easily customize the look and layout of the system to their particular needs. Themes are used to give ATutor a new look, to give categories of courses their own look, or to provide multiple versions of ATutor on a single system, from which users could choose one as a preference setting.

The privilege system allows instructors to assign tool management privileges to particular members of a course. Instructors may create assistants or course tutors that had limited control over any of the authoring or management tools.

== E-learning patent dispute ==
ATutor is one of three open source learning management systems named in a formal challenge to an e-learning patent issued to Blackboard Inc. in July 2006. The Software Freedom Law Center filed a re-examination request on behalf of ATutor, and two other clients in late 2006. In early 2007 the re-examination request was granted by the United States Patent and Trademark Office (USPTO). If successful, the request will ultimately lead to the cancellation of all 44 claims of the Blackboard patent.

In support of the challenge to the Blackboard patent, volunteers across the Internet found examples of older programs that used ideas claimed by the patent. These volunteers collaborated to make a Wikipedia article on the History of virtual learning environments, which documents several examples of prior art.

Additionally, Greg Gay, project lead of ATutor asserted in support of the re-examination request: "A patent on an educational concept -- namely the relationship among students, instructors, and administrators -- makes no sense. Such ideas are public and have been practiced for centuries; they are not the result of research and development."

== See also ==
- List of content management systems
- Learning management system
- Intellectual property
- Adaptive technology
- Online learning community
