= Adolfo J. de Bold =

Canadian medical researcher (1942–2021)

- Born: Adolfo José de Bold; February 14, 1942; Paraná, Entre Ríos, Argentina
- Died: October 22, 2021 (aged 79); Ottawa, Ontario, Canada
- Known for: Atrial natriuretic peptide (ANP) discovery and synthesis; endocrine functions of the heart
- Scientific career
- Fields: Cardiac research

Adolfo José de Bold OC FRSC (February 14, 1942 – October 22, 2021) was an Argentine-Canadian cardiovascular researcher, best known for his discovery of atrial natriuretic peptide (ANP), a polypeptide hormone secreted by heart muscle cells. The hormone plays a role in regulating blood pressure, blood volume, and cardiovascular growth, and its discovery proved the endocrine function of the heart.

De Bold was an officer of the Order of Canada and was an inductee into the Canadian Medical Hall of Fame.

== Early life and education ==
De Bold was born Adolfo José de Bold on February 14, 1942, to Ana Patriarca and Adolfo Guillermo de Bold in Paraná, Entre Ríos in eastern Argentina. His mother was a homemaker and his father was a bureaucrat.

Before moving to Canada in 1968, De Bold obtained his Bachelor of Science degree in clinical biochemistry at the faculty of chemical sciences of the National University of Córdoba. His move to Canada was prompted by dissatisfaction with the Argentine scientific faculties, particularly challenges in publishing research in international journals and publications. Later discussing the move, he said that he moved to Canada with his scientist wife, Mercedes Kuroski de Bold, "with no plan whatsoever for the future". He then obtained his Master of Science degree in 1972 and a Ph.D. in 1973 from the department of pathology at Queen's University in Kingston, Ontario, under the direction of Sergio Bencosme.

== Career ==
De Bold began his career working at the Queen's University in 1974, becoming a professor in 1985. In 1986, he became director of research at the University of Ottawa Heart Institute, a position he held until 1993. In 2008, de Bold was the director of the cardiovascular endocrinology laboratory at the University of Ottawa Heart Institute, and also an assistant professor of pathology and cellular and molecular medicine at the University of Ottawa.

=== Research ===
De Bold started his research career studying storage granules found in the upper chambers of the heart whose function was not understood at the time. While similar granules had been found in the endocrine glands including the pancreas, their function within the heart was not known. Studying this in collaboration with his wife and fellow researcher, Kuroski de Bold, they hypothesized that the structures were linked to a hormone secreted by the heart to balance the salt and water linked effects on blood pressure. The hypotheses had been proposed earlier by other scientists, but had not been validated. Studies by De Bold and his wife, along with Harold Sonnenberg, a University of Toronto physiologist, demonstrated that the secretion mimicked insulin in regulating blood sugar as well as lowering salt and blood pressure.

In 1980, this work led to his discovery and isolation of atrial natriuretic peptide (ANP) alternately known as atrial natriuretic factor (ANF), a polypeptide hormone secreted by heart muscle cells or mammalian atrial cardiocyte. This was the first demonstration that the heart has an endocrine function. De Bold's team went on to show that the heart modulates blood pressure, blood volume, and cardiovascular growth via ANP.

The discovery also led to what was called the Heart Hormone Patent Wars, with laboratories across the world racing to try and synthesize the hormone in what was considered the heart's hormone equivalent of insulin, with the rationale that the hormone could be used to treat heart conditions and also, to diagnose heart attacks. Lacking partnerships with drug companies, De Bold and his team at Queen's University found themselves at a disadvantage driving practical applications. Eventually, the team was able to synthesize the hormone. The discovery of ANP opened up a new field of research that has resulted in multiple therapeutic and diagnostic applications in heart failure.

=== Awards and honours ===
De Bold received many awards for his work on ANP, including the Gairdner Foundation International Award (1986), Manning Innovation Awards Principal Award (1986), Royal Society of Canada McLaughlin Medal in Medical Research (1988), International Society of Hypertension Research Award (1990), CIBA Award of the American Heart Association (1994), the American Society of Hypertension Research Award, and the Gran Prix Scientifique Lefoulon-Delalande, Institut de France (2014). The Heart and Stroke Foundation of Ontario included the discovery of ANP among its top ten research discoveries of the past fifty years.

He was a fellow of the Royal Society of Canada and of the American Association for the Advancement of Science. In 1992, he was appointed an officer of the Order of Canada. In 2014, he was inducted into the Canadian Medical Hall of Fame.

== Personal life ==
De Bold married fellow scientist and collaborator Mercedes Kuroski, a classmate in Argentina. The couple had five children. While settled in Canada, the family maintained their ties to Argentina, spending a month annually vacationing in the country.

Adolfo J. de Bold died on October 22, 2021, in Ottawa, Canada, aged 79.

== Key papers ==
- de Bold, A. J. (1982). "Atrial natriuretic factor of the rat heart. Studies on isolation and properties". Proceedings of the Society for Experimental Biology and Medicine. 170 (2): 133–138. doi:10.3181/00379727-170-41408. ISSN 0037-9727. PMID 7201139. S2CID 209363070.
- de Bold, A. J. (1982). "Tissue fractionation studies on the relationship between an atrial natriuretic factor and specific atrial granules". Canadian Journal of Physiology and Pharmacology. 60 (3): 324–330. doi:10.1139/y82-045. ISSN 0008-4212. PMID 7200387.
- de Bold, AJ; Borenstein, HB; Veress, AT; Sonnenberg, H (1981). "A rapid and potent natriuretic response to intravenous injection of atrial myocardial extract in rats". Life Sciences. 28 (1): 89–94. doi:10.1016/0024-3205(81)90370-2. PMID 7219045. S2CID 10331174.
- Flynn, TG; de Bold, ML; de Bold, AJ (1983). "The amino acid sequence of an atrial peptide with potent diuretic and natriuretic properties". Biochemical and Biophysical Research Communications. 117 (3): 859–65. doi:10.1016/0006-291x(83)91675-3. PMID 6230081.
- de Bold, AJ (1985). "Atrial natriuretic factor: a hormone produced by the heart". Science. 230 (4727): 767–70. Bibcode:1985Sci...230..767D. doi:10.1126/science.2932797. PMID 2932797.
- Goetze, JP; Bruneau, BG; Ramos, HR; Ogawa, T; de Bold, MK; de Bold, AJ (2020). "Cardiac natriuretic peptides". Nature Reviews. Cardiology. 17 (11): 698–717. doi:10.1038/s41569-020-0381-0. PMID 32444692. S2CID 218772499.
