= Académie Ste. Cécile International School =

Location
- 925 Cousineau Road; Windsor, Ontario, N9G 1V8; Canada; 42.2425°N 83.0059°W

Information
- School type: Private co-educational university preparatory
- Motto: Latin: Veritas, Justitia, Caritas, Pax (Truth, Justice, Love, and Peace)
- Religious affiliation: Roman Catholicism
- Patron saint: Saint Cecilia
- Established: 1979, (music school), 1993 (school)
- CEEB code: 826979
- Director: Therese Gadoury
- Principal: Samantha Morin
- Staff: 60
- Grades: K-12
- Enrollment: c. 400
- International students: c. 120
- Average class size: 15
- Campus size: 30 acres (12 ha)
- Campus type: Suburban
- School fees: ~ $15000 Local (Non-Boarding), ~$50000 International (Boarding)
- Website: academiestececile.ca

Académie Ste. Cécile International School, commonly referred to as ASCIS or Ste. Cécile, is a private school located in the South Windsor neighbourhood of Windsor, Ontario, Canada.

The school was opened in 1993 by Therese Gadoury as Académie Ste. Cécile Private School (ASCPS). Despite the school's French name, it has been an English school since inception. In 1997, the school underwent a name change to Académie Ste. Cécile International School.

The school places an emphasis on music, with all students required to learn an instrument, and the school is therefore named after Saint Cecilia, the patron saint of music. The primary campus of the school consists of an elementary school from kindergarten to grade 8, in addition to a high school. Each has a student population of approximately 300.

The school is also linked with a music school, dance school, nursery school, and school for those with special needs. The school also offers both International Baccalaureate (IB) and Advanced Placement (AP) programs, including it within a handful of Windsor schools that offer these programs.

The school includes both local and boarding students, with international students primarily coming from China, Hong Kong, Brazil , Colombia, and Mexico, who live at the school for the duration of their studies.

== History ==
The music school and dance studio were opened in 1979 by Therese Gadoury, and expanded a year later to include a nursery school. Gadoury remains the director of the school today.

In 1984, a second music school location was constructed in South Windsor, although not at the site of the current elementary & secondary school. The school was opened in 1993 in Tecumseh, on the site of the original music school. In 1995, the school moved to a new campus in South Windsor, on the site of the former Holy Redeemer Seminary.

In 1996, the school became associated with the University of Windsor, allowing school students to access university libraries and computer networks. The school also received International Baccalaureate Certification, allowing instruction in IB courses.

In 2004, the school finished construction of a new 27,000 square foot building to house its elementary school. In 2005, it built a new wing of the school named for Pope John Paul II, who died that year.

In 2010, it began construction of three residence to house international students, both short-term and long-term.

In 2012, it completed an NBA regulation size gym in addition to an outside track with an artificial turf field. In 2014, it completed an expansion of the elementary school by extending an existing wing to add four more classrooms. In 2015, it began construction of an auditorium and new facilities to house the music and dance school.

== Campus ==
The school is located at the southern reach of South Windsor, bordering Cousineau Road in the front and the Herb Gray Parkway on the south. A Catholic elementary school and church, Our Lady of Mount Carmel, sits just down the road. St. Clair College is on Highway 3, just minutes away from the school.

The rear of the campus features an athletic field and an oval track. The school also has two gyms, with one being an NBA-regulation size gym and the other being approximately half the size. They are adjoined by a weight room and workout room. The school also has a moderately sized cafeteria and a computer lab. There are also specialized facilities including art studios and halls/practice rooms for music.

The school also adjoins an elementary school and three residences for international students.

== Curriculum ==
St. Cecile operates on an 8:30 a.m. to 3:30 p.m. full-year schedule, with the school year normally running from mid-August to early June. This is distinct from other schools in Canada which traditionally begin school after Labour Day and finish near the end of June. The day is divided into six instructional periods of an hour each and a lunch of 40 minutes.

=== Enrollment ===
In the 2016–2017 school year, St. Cecile had an enrollment of approximately 400 students divided equally between the elementary and secondary school. With 50 faculty members, the student-faculty ratio of the school is 8:1. Including international students, the student population of the secondary school and elementary school is very diverse.

=== Programs ===
The school is best known for its academics and is able to offer smaller class size than public schools due to the tuition costs, with classes having a maximum size of 15 students. All classes are offered at the academic level, with additional courses being available for Advanced Placement and International Baccalaureate requirements.

The school is unique in Windsor in offering both the Advanced Placement program and the International Baccalaureate program.

The school's main local competitors academically are Vincent Massey Secondary School with its Advanced Placement ("Enriched") programme, and Assumption College School which also offers International Baccalaureate.

The school is primarily focused on STEM fields, especially science and mathematics. It has previously done well on the University of Waterloo's CEMC-administered math contests such as several perfect scores in the past.

The school does not have any vocational or skills-based education.

== International Students ==
The school has over 110 international students for the entire school year, originating mainly in Hong Kong and China. Full year international students pay $49,300 for tuition, boarding, and meals. Many Mexican students also study at the school for 6-month periods, while students from Mexico and Colombia also come to study for short periods (several weeks). The majority of Mexican students are from Instituto Technologico y de Esutios Superiores de Monterrey's high school affiliate, who study as part of their multicultural program to learn English.

The students live in the school's residences for the duration of their stay at the school.

== Extracurricular activities ==
=== Athletics ===
The school offers 9 varsity sports for both males and females, including basketball, badminton, cross country running, ice hockey, golf, soccer, swimming, tennis, track & field, and volleyball. In 2023, the school established a boys’ U18 Prep hockey team and a girls’ U19 hockey team. The teams include players from Canada, the United States, Taiwan, China, Australia, New Zealand, and Europe, and the boys’ U18 team captured the GLPHL Championship during the 2024–2025 season. Due to its small size, the school fields teams within Tier III of WECSAA, the bottom tier. Individual and dual sports operate in a single league irrespective of enrollment. The school has, however, invested heavily in its facilities and now includes an NBA regulation size gym with an elevated track, in addition to an exterior track with an artificial turf field. The school has previously hosted OFSAA events in its facilities due to their high capacity.

Participation in sports includes approximately 70% of the student population, with many students playing multiple sports due to the very low student population. The top athletes of the year, both male and female and decided upon by coaches, are awarded a plaque at the end of the year. The school's tennis and badminton teams are among their most competitive. The tennis team has previously reached the finals at OFSAA in ladies' doubles as well as winning SWOSSAA in men's doubles. The school's badminton team is one of the most competitive sports due to the sport's popularity among the primarily Asian international students. The school reached SWOSAA finals in 2017.

==== Contact Sports ====
The school does not allow contact sports, thus the school does not have an American football, or wrestling team.

=== Other Extracurriculars ===
==== Band ====
Due to the school's size, Ste. Cécile's band program consists of just two bands - the high school concert band and the jazz band. The elementary school also fields a concert band and wind ensemble.

==== Debate ====
The school's debate club has performed well in local competitions, reaching the finals in 2017. Prior to that, two former students, Mark Laschuck and Paul Istasy won the local Vincent Massey debate competition in 2014 while receiving the 2nd and 3rd best speaker awards respectively.

==== Student Council ====
The school has a student council, consisting of the Prime Minister, the Deputy Prime Minister, the Treasurer, the Secretary, and two further executive members. There is also one representative for each junior grade (9th and 10th grade), and two for each senior grade (11th and 12th grade). The student council is responsible for organizing a variety of events, including student dances, pep rallies, and fundraisers.

==== Clubs ====
The school competes in the Science Olympics competition at the University of Windsor and also has a math club.

==== Outreach Programs ====
The school places an emphasis on fundraisers for disadvantaged persons given that the school's tuition results in students being from high socioeconomic classes. The elementary and secondary schools have held coordinated can drives for 15 years, and raised 10,000 cans of food in the 2016–17 school year.

== Awards and Recognitions ==
The school's club and teams have received various awards in the past. As well, past students have received Schulich Scholarships valued at $80,000. The school's student have also done well at the Intel International Science & Engineering Fair, with three students having attended and won grand award and special award prizes. Grade 11 and 12 History and Geography students were also awarded the 2018 Lieutenant Governor's Ontario Heritage Award for Youth Achievement for their work in creating a digital map of Essex's Lost African-Canadian Cemeteries.

== Notable alumni ==
- Alex Deans - Youth inventor and public speaker at We Day and the Intel International Science & Engineering Fair
- Amelia Daigle - Mezzo-soprano opera singer and first-place winner at the National Music Festival
