= Kenneth O. Hill =

Mexican Canadian physicist

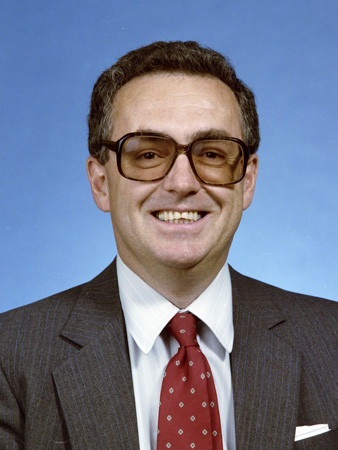
- Hill in 1988
- Born: 1939 (age 86–87)
- Education: McMaster University
- Awards: Fellowship, Optical Society of America; Manning Principal Award; John Tyndall Award; Medal for Outstanding Achievement in Applied Photonics; Rank Prize in Optoelectronics
- Scientific career
- Fields: Physics, Photonics
- Workplaces: Communications Research Centre; Nu-Wave Photonics/Zenastra Photonics Inc; OZ Optics Limited

Kenneth O. Hill is a Mexican Canadian physicist who specializes in the field of photonics. In the late 1970s, he discovered the phenomenon of photosensitivity in optical fibre and has worked extensively in its applications. He first demonstrated fibre Bragg gratings and their applications in optical communication and optical sensor systems. Further areas of his discovery and innovation include the phase mask technique for grating fabrication, fibre grating dispersion compensators, and wavelength selective fibre filters, multiplexers and demultiplexers. This field of research has led to the ability to create high-speed fibre optic networks as well as many other communication applications that have revolutionized the telecommunications industry.

== Early life and education ==
Hill was born in 1939 in Guadalajara, Mexico. He attended the American elementary school in Guadalajara until high school, whereupon he attended Upper Canada College in Toronto, Ontario, Canada. Hill pursued a B.Eng. (1963), M.Eng. (1965) as well as a Ph.D. in engineering physics (1968) from McMaster University in Hamilton, Ontario, Canada. He is also a Professional Engineer in the Province of Ontario, Canada.

== Career ==
Upon completing his Ph.D. in 1968, Hill worked for the Government of Canada's Defense Research Telecommunications Establishment (DRTE) as a research scientist. Later that year, the DRTE was converted to the Communications Research Centre (CRC). At CRC, he continued as a research scientist before working as a group leader in optical data storage and signal processing (1970–1975), manager of optical communications (1975–1985), director of optical communications (1985–1992) as well as principal scientist (1992–2000).

In 2000, Hill left CRC and was appointed to be the director of research at Nu-Wave Photonics/Zenastra Photonics Inc, operating in optical circuit and network design and manufacturing. In 2001, Hill joined OZ Optics Limited, a supplier of optical products for optical networks, as a part of their research team.

== Awards and honors ==
In 1991, Hill was elected to Fellowship in the Optical Society of America (OSA) for his efforts pertaining to fused fibre optical couplers, photosensitivity in fibre, novel fibre-based devices and nonlinear effects in fibre. He was the 1995 recipient of the Manning Principal Award for the discovery of photosensitivity in optical fibre as well as the many commercial applications his work led to. At the 1996 Optical Fiber Communications Conference, Hill was awarded the John Tyndall Award sponsored by the Institute of Electrical and Electronics Engineers (IEEE), the Lasers and Electro-Optics Society (LEOS) and the Optical Society of America. The award was presented for the discovery of photosensitivity in optical fibres and its application to Bragg gratings used in device applications in optical communications and sensor systems." In 1998, Hill was awarded the inaugural Medal for Outstanding Achievement in Applied Photonics from the Canadian Association of Physicists (CAP) and the National Optics Institute (INO). Hill was also awarded the Rank Prize in Optoelectronics in 2002 as one of four scientists recognized for creating and developing fibre Bragg gratings.
