= Canadian Young Scientist Journal =

- Discipline: Multidisciplinary
- Language: English, French
- Edited by: Alexandre Noukhovitch

Publication details
- History: 2008–present
- Publisher: Foundation for Student Science and Technology (Canada)
- Frequency: Biannually

Standard abbreviations
- ISO 4: Can. Young Sci. J.

Indexing
- ISSN: 1913-1925

Links
- Journal homepage

The Canadian Young Scientist Journal (French: Revue Canadienne des Jeunes Scientifiques) is a non-profit peer-reviewed publication covering student-driven research. It was established in May 2008 by its current editor-in-chief, Alexandre Noukhovitch and is published by the Foundation for Student Science and Technology. In 2014 it was renamed Journal of Student Science and Technology and is a joint program supported by the federal Science and Technology Cluster. It provides secondary school students with an opportunity to publish the results of their research. The journal is based in Toronto and is published biannually. It works in close association with Youth Science Canada. The journal includes project reports, case studies, and science book reviews authored by high school students. To benefit science education and to support classroom activities, the journal publishes expert reviews along with students' papers. Notable student editors of this journal have included Maya Burhanpurkar.

== Circulation ==
One copy of the journal is distributed to every Canadian high school for free. Paying members gain access to online archives and other benefits. In 2009–2010, the journal received a $28,000 grant from the Canadian Space Agency to "promote space science and engineering careers". The journal is available on-line through EBSCO Press, Educational Collection.
