= Murray Goldberg =

Canadian academic

Murray Goldberg (born October 1962) is a noted Canadian educational technologist and a faculty member in the Department of Computer Science at the University of British Columbia in Vancouver, Canada. Goldberg is best known for being the founder of the elearning companies WebCT, Silicon Chalk, Marine Learning Systems and most recently SkillGrader. Goldberg was born in Calgary, Alberta, Canada and raised in Edmonton. He moved to British Columbia to attend the University of Victoria in 1980. Murray graduated from UVic in 1985 and then went on to earn an MSc from the University of British Columbia. In 2004 he was awarded an honorary Ph.D. from the Southern Cross University. Murray serves as director for various companies, sits on the board of trustees of Harvey Mudd College in Claremont California, is a mentor at the GSV Labs tech incubator in Redwood City California, and is a frequent consultant and speaker on the future of eLearning. Murray is also the chair of the British Columbia chapter of the Manning Innovation Awards.

== Professional History ==
=== University of British Columbia ===
Murray began as a faculty member in the Department of Computer Science at UBC in 1993 and was awarded tenure there in 1998. In 1994, his first year as a faculty member at UBC, Goldberg won the Killiam Teaching Prize at UBC. Goldberg took a leave of absence from UBC in 1998 to lead WebCT full-time.

=== WebCT ===
In 1995, as a UBC faculty member, Goldberg was researching the effectiveness of Web-Based learning environments. Goldberg found that the experience of building the courses for this experimentation was sufficiently time consuming and expensive that he decided to create a platform to enable the simple and rapid creation of web-based learning environments, WebCT. WebCT was widely accepted as a catalyst in the worldwide boom of on-line learning that accelerated beginning in 1997. By November, 2000 WebCT was purportedly serving 6 million students in 57 countries, and by late 2001, 10 million students in 80 countries at 2250 universities and colleges. In 1999, Goldberg sold most of his stake in WebCT to Boston-Based Universal Learning Technology. The combined company took on the WebCT name. Goldberg remained as president of the Canadian division of WebCT until 2002 when he left to co-found Silicon Chalk.

=== Silicon Chalk ===
In 2002 Goldberg co-founded Silicon Chalk and served as the president and CEO. Silicon Chalk created software for use in laptop or computer enabled higher education classrooms. The software facilitated the recording of classroom presentations, student note taking, polling, file sharing, and other features. The company never achieved widespread success, though did have users in 70 universities and colleges when it was sold to Horizon Wimba

=== Brainify ===
In 2007 Goldberg began work on Brainify, an academic social bookmarking and networking site for university and college students and professors. Brainify was launched in January 2009 and Goldberg acts as the president and CEO. Members from 250 institutions had joined within the first 20 days of its launch.

=== AssociCom ===
In June, 2010, Goldberg launched AssociCom, a professional networking and discovery platform with an emphasis on enabling member discovery, learning and connection within professional associations and societies.

=== Marine Learning Systems ===
Also in 2010, Murray founded the company Marine Learning Systems (website). Their product, MarineLMS, is a learning management system for training in the maritime industry, with BC Ferries as their first customer.

Marine Learning Systems went on to serve many of the largest vessel operators in the maritime space including most of the largest cruise lines, along with ferry operators, coast guards, navies and others, and in 2023 was sold to Bleecker Street Group.

=== SkillGrader ===
In 2023, Murray founded the company SkillGrader (website) as a spin-out of Marine Learning Systems. SkillGrader is an application for objective observational assessment of individuals or teams while performing skills. Early users include the Canadian Navy, large cruise lines, ferry operators and first responders.

== Selected Awards and Distinctions ==
- 2018 - Murray Goldberg awarded the UBC Computer Science 50th Anniversary Entrepreneurship Award. These Awards Celebrate 50 Years of Excellence in Research, Learning, and Innovation.
- 2011 - Murray Goldberg named as one of the top 15 Canadians in Digital Media
- 2004 - Murray Goldberg awarded the $100,000 National Manning Innovation Awards Principal Award for Innovation. This is a National award, awarded once per year for innovation in any human endeavor Award video can be found here.
- 2004 - Murray Goldberg granted an Honorary Ph.D., Southern Cross University, Gold Coast, Australia
- 2001 – Murray Goldberg awarded the New Media Hyperion Award. This award for excellence is awarded annually to those who have made a significant contribution in the creation or development of software tools, hardware or connectivity innovations.
- 2000 – Murray Goldberg awarded the National CANARIE IWAY Award. This is a national award, awarded to nominees who have pioneered innovative uses of technology related to the development of Canada's information highway.
- 1994 - Murray Goldberg awarded the "Killiam Teaching Prize". These prizes, accompanied by a monetary award, are given annually at UBC to a small number of faculty members who have exhibited excellence in teaching.
