= TICCIT =

TICCIT (an acronym for Time-shared, Interactive, Computer-Controlled Information Television) was first developed by the MITRE Corporation in 1968 as an interactive cable television (CATV) system.

From June 1971 through July 1972, MITRE demonstrated a number of potential social, commercial, governmental, and educational interactive services through the Reston, Virginia cable television system. The original system created computer generated frames, converted to NTSC color signals, that subscribers could interact with on their television sets through a touch-tone telephone. In December 1971, the National Science Foundation (NSF) Technological Innovations Group granted a contract to MITRE to further develop the TICCIT system as a computer-assisted instruction (CAI) system for community colleges and universities. MITRE subcontracted with the CAI Laboratory at the University of Texas at Austin and also with the Department of Instructional Research, Development, and Evaluation of Brigham Young University to refine the user interface and create the massive amounts of courseware needed to teach a complete college-level English and algebra course. A trial implementation of the English and algebra courseware took place through the 1975-77 school years and was evaluated by the Educational Testing Service (ETS).

TICCIT installations ran on a Data General Nova minicomputer that could support over 100 simultaneous users. Participating community colleges were Northern Virginia Community College in Alexandria, Virginia, and Phoenix College in Phoenix, Arizona. Following the end of the NSF-funded project, the Hazeltine Corporation acquired the rights to commercialize the TICCIT system, which they did for several years, selling systems to military, industrial, and educational customers. With the advent of the personal computer, Hazeltine released an updated version of TICCIT, known as MicroTICCIT. The rights were later sold to Ford Aerospace.

Courseware developed over the years for TICCIT included algebra, chemistry, Danish, English (grammar, mechanics, spelling, and composition), English as a second language (ESL), French, German, humanities, Italian, Japanese, Norwegian, physics, Portuguese, Spanish, Swedish, and Thai. Later projects at Brigham Young University adapted material authored for TICCIT to Apple II computers, DOS PCs, and eventually DVDs.

One of the major innovations of the TICCIT system was the architecture of its instruction. A standard set of displays was provided for each segment of subject-matter (representing one or more instructional objectives). The definition of the display set was based on the Component Display Theory of M. David Merrill. The goal of this arrangement was to place moment-to-moment control of instruction in the hands of the learner. A special keypad was provided for learners to the right of the standard keyboard keys. This provided keys for each instructional display type as well as for other administrative and navigational functions. Using these keys, a learner could navigate freely through the displays provided within a segment and manage the instructional session itself. Help and Advice keys were provided, and computer-chosen instructional sequencing was available if the learner chose.

The U.S. Marine Corps Communications/Electronics School at MCB 29 Palms, California, used a TICCIT system for courses in its schools in the 1980s. Electronics-related courseware and data communications operations were the primary focus.

== Learner control keys ==
A special keypad to the right of the standard keyboard keys contained the following:

Learner control keys
ATTENTION	EXIT	REPEAT
GO	SKIP	BACK
OBJECTIVE	MAP	ADVICE
HELP	HARD	EASY
RULE	EXAMPLE	PRACTICE

== TEL-CATCH ==
TEL-CATCH (Televised Education Lessons via Computer-Assisted Instruction at Home over Cablevision to Children with Severe Handicapping Conditions) was an offshoot of TICCIT, piloted in Amherst, New York in 1976–1977. Handicap students at home could use a $150 keyboard/acoustic coupler combo to dial-in to a central computer (HP 2000F). Requested educational lessons selected via the keyboard were then sent over the CATV system to the student's television.
