= UKeU =

The UKeU (UK eUniversities Worldwide Limited) was a company and website that promoted online degrees from UK universities. UKeU delivered courses over a learning environment developed by Sun Microsystems UK. It was set up with UK public funds under the auspices of the Higher Education Funding Council for England. It operated between 2000 and 2004 and was subsequently wound down having failed to deliver its targets.

== Brief history ==
The UKeU was first proposed as a concept by David Blunkett, then Secretary of State for Education for the UK, in a speech in February 2000, as a vehicle to deliver the best of UK higher education in online fashion across the world. The Secretary of State instructed the Higher Education Funding Council for England (HEFCE) to take the lead in putting this into practice.

Many universities already offered their own online courses. The Scottish universities were not part of the UKeU. The idea behind the UKeU was that it would be a broker, an agent marketing online degrees and providing a technological platform to facilitate expansion.

By late summer 2000, the key initial studies on the business model, tools and markets had already been done and a shadow body, the e-University Steering Group had been established. By May 2001 many follow-up studies had been done and the operating company UK eUniversities Worldwide Limited had been incorporated; by summer 2001 an Interim Management Team had been appointed; and by October 2001 the Strategic Agreement had been signed by Sun Microsystems. By March 2002 a new chairman and CEO were in post and the Framework Agreement had been signed with Sun to commence development of the e-learning platform. Much of the cost of the UKeU was absorbed by the development of the technical platform and it was suggested that existing web-based learning platforms could have been used or adapted for use at a fraction of the cost. Sun Microsystems contributed "£3.5 million of professional services and hardware" rather than cash.

The UkeU did not award its own degrees, instead contracting with universities to offer theirs. The company focused on infrastructure development, course development support, quality assurance, and marketing. The target audiences were primarily international graduate students who wished to study online rather than come to the UK By March 2003 two courses had been launched, from the Open University and Sheffield Hallam University, with many further courses following in autumn 2003 making a total of 15. By January 2004 some 25 courses were recruiting students.

The first Annual Report of UKeU is no longer easy to find but there is a detailed analysis of it by OBHE still available at http://www.obhe.ac.uk/documents/2003/Articles/UK_eUniversity_annual_report_2002_03_what_more_does_it_tell_us_

== Cancellation ==
It became clear however, that HEFCE had been unhappy for some months, especially with the low student numbers and the lack of private finance, and had commissioned PA Consulting to carry out a Business Review of UKeU. PA reported finally to HEFCE in January 2004 and in late February 2004 HEFCE announced to the UKeU Board and to the world that they would "restructure" UKeU. Although it was not announced as such at the time, this restructuring led to a rapid decline in funds and confidence and UKeU closed as an operating entity in summer 2004. It was regarded as a failure having cost £50 m and recruited only 900 students.

These received some of the most expensive degrees in history at £56,000 each. A highly critical [report https://publications.parliament.uk/pa/cm200405/cmselect/cmeduski/205/20502.htm] by the UK House of Commons Select committee on Education and Skills was published in March 2005. In an accompanying press release, Committee chairman, Barry Sheerman said: "UKeU was a terrible waste of public money. The senior executives failed to interest any private investors and showed an extraordinary over confidence in their ability to attract students to the scheme. Any private company which rewards underperformance of this scale would normally face severe criticism from its shareholders."

The £2m-plus wage bill for 2002 to 2003 included chief executive John Beaumont's £180,000 salary and performance-related bonus of £44,914. UKeU's executive directors received £100,000 in total bonuses during 2002/2003.

HEFCE identified marketing, and inadequate market research in particular, as the key cause of the failure of UKeU. Based on an assumption that there was a huge unmet demand for internet based e-learning, too much trust was put on the PwC forecast of student numbers and the general atmosphere of enthusiasm surrounding the 'dot com boom' . UKeU did not undertake any market research despite spending £4.2 million on sales and marketing. There was confusion in the branding and unique selling points of the online offerings. Mainstream UK higher education at the time relied heavily on emphasising the three elements of tradition, place, and quality. Marketing by UKeU that promised "the best of U.K. higher education with online convenience".

The overall concept of a "UK e-University" lasted 4½ years, while the company in its operational phase lasted just over two. Even by the standards of e-learning burn-outs, this was fast. Unlike in many cases in the public or quasi-public sector such as TechBC or Scottish Knowledge, there was no organisation that followed on from UKeU, even in a general sense. However, a number of small components of UKeU continued more or less unchanged as spin-offs, including the eChina Programme and the e-Learning Research Centre.
