= Canada-Wide Science Fair =

Annual science fair in Canada

Youth Science Canada
- Headquarters: Pickering, Ontario
- Location: Canada
- Official language: English, French
- Executive Director: Reni Barlow
- Website: www.youthscience.ca

Started in 1962, the Canadian-Wide Science Fair (abbreviated as CWSF) is an annual science fair in Canada coordinated by Youth Science Canada. Finalists qualify from approximately 25,000 competitors at over 100 Youth Science Canada-affiliated regional science fairs in every province and territory, or, in the province of Quebec, the provincial science fair.

Competition is split into three age/grade categories: Junior for grades 7 and 8, Intermediate for grades 9 and 10, and Senior for grades 11, 12 and Cégep.

The Canada-Wide Science Fair is a weeklong event. Students travel with their respective regional representatives to the designated location (listed below). The Canada-Wide Science Fair has been held every year since 1962. The Canada-Wide Science Fair was presented by Blackberry from 2012 through 2014.

== History ==
The First Canada-Wide Science Fair was held May 11 and 12, 1962 at the Science Building at Carleton University in Ottawa. In 1962, the fair was co-sponsored by the Kiwanis Club of Ottawa Incorporated. The initial Headquarters for the Canadian Science Fairs Council was 45 Rideau Street, Ottawa. The two-day science fair was made up of 45 exhibits of regional winners from secondary school fairs across the country.

The 2020 Canada-Wide Science Fair in Edmonton, Alberta was cancelled due to concerns over the COVID-19 pandemic: the cancellation was the first time that Youth Science Canada had ever cancelled the fair. Next year saw its return on a virtual basis.

== Intel International Science and Engineering Fair (Intel ISEF) ==
Several competitors and winners from the Canada-Wide Science Fair have been selected for competition at the Intel International Science and Engineering Fair as part of Team Canada, among them inventors Ann Makosinski and Alex Deans. Past Canada-Wide Science Fair winners Raymond Wang and Austin Wang both from Vancouver, BC, won the Gordon E. Moore award at Intel ISEF in 2015 and 2016, respectively. In 2025 Evan Budz from Burlington, Ontario, won the Gordon E. Moore award at Regeneron Isef

== Awards ==
Almost $1 million in awards and scholarships is given out each year at the Canada-Wide Science Fair. Bronze, silver, and gold medals are awarded to outstanding projects in each age/grade category (see above). Challenge awards are presented for the best project in each of seven STEM challenges (discovery, energy, environment, health, information, innovation and resources) for each age/grade category. Sponsored special awards are also offered. Three Grand Awards recognize the top project from the gold medal winners in each age/grade category: The Best Project Award (including $2,500 cash) is presented to the top overall project, regardless of category. The top projects from the two remaining categories receive Platinum Awards, which include $1,000 cash. Two or three of the platinum award winners compete at the European Union Contest for Young Scientists. Canadian students have won EUCYS core prizes (first, second, and third prizes) for the past five consecutive years. Notable winners include Liam Desre, Gurnoor Kaur, Sara Waqas, and Evan Budz.

== Host Cities ==
Below is a list of host cities of the Canada Wide Science Fair.

Year	City	Province	Regions	Projects	Finalists
2026	Edmonton	AB	95	341	388
2025	Fredericton	NB	96	336	385
2024	Ottawa	ON	98	340	381
2023	Edmonton	AB	102	338	389
2022	Fredericton	NB	93	324	371
2021	Ottawa	ON	99	335	370
2020	Edmonton	AB	N/A	N/A	N/A
2019	Fredericton	NB	103	409	461
2018	Ottawa	ON	103	403	458
2017	Regina	SK	101	390	443
2016	Montréal	QC	104	420	485
2015	Fredericton	NB	101	402	469
2014	Windsor	ON	100	381	462
2013	Lethbridge	AB	100	400	481
2012	Charlottetown	PE	103	402	489
2011	Toronto	ON	99	425	509
2010	Peterborough	ON	102	407	494
2009	Winnipeg	MB	102	387	474
2008	Ottawa	ON	102	386	478
2007	Truro	NS	98	369	459
2006	Saguenay	QC	99	369	455
2005	Vancouver	BC	98	384	479
2004	St. John's	NL	96	375	483
2003	Calgary	AB	90	362	465
2002	Saskatoon	SK	89	336	447
2001	Kingston	ON	91	345	431
2000	London	ON	95	341	437
1999	Edmonton	AB	99	328	427
1998	Timmins	ON	98	318	443
1997	Regina	SK	93	315	411
1996	North Bay	ON	103	331	423
1995	Whitehorse	YT	102	317	393
1994	Guelph	ON	102	307	410
1993	Rivière-du-Loup	QC	106	299	399
1992	Sudbury	ON	103	298	387
1991	Vancouver	BC	102	297	383
1990	Windsor	ON	99	310	411
1989	St. John's	NF	94	311	377
1988	Winnipeg	MB	92	308	396
1987	Mississauga	ON	85	297	376
1986	Calgary	AB	71	302	374
1985	Cornwall	ON	68	272	321
1984	Halifax	NS	67	262	314
1983	Saskatoon	SK	61	188	230
1982	Toronto	ON	56	196	248
1981	Waterloo	ON	52	186	236
1980	Thompson	MB	51	170	236
1979	London	ON	50	171	220
1978	Sudbury	ON	55	165	182
1977	Victoria	BC	51	137	168
1976	Brandon	MB	47	124	163
1975	Jonquière	QC	48	134	187
1974	Calgary	AB	42	112	147
1973	Thunder Bay	ON	38	100	124
1972	Sarnia	ON	38	96	110
1971	Edmonton	AB	34	85	85
1970	Hamilton	ON	38	91	91
1969	Regina	SK	30	64	64
1968	Vancouver	BC	28	68	68
1967	Québec	QC	28	72	73
1966	Windsor	ON	26	74	74
1965	Winnipeg	MB	26	68	68
1964	Montréal	QC	22	60	60
1963	Toronto	ON	18	53	54
1962	Ottawa	ON	12	45	45
