= Michigan Virtual University =

Education organization in Lansing, United States

Michigan Virtual
- Company type: Private
- Industry: Educational Software
- Founded: 1998
- Headquarters: Lansing, Michigan
- Key people: Jamey Fitzpatrick, President and CEO
- Services: Online Courses; Educational Resources
- Divisions: Student Learning Services; Professional Learning Services; Michigan Virtual Learning Research Institute
- Website: https://michiganvirtual.org/

Michigan Virtual University (MVU) is a private, nonprofit corporation that provides online educational tools, resources and courses for middle and high school students, parents and K-12 educators. Established in 1998 by the Michigan governor John Engler and the Michigan Economic Development Corporation, MVU is governed by an independent Board of Directors composed of individuals representing business, industry, higher education, K-12 education and state government. MVU also provides Michigan's K-12 educators access to online courses and resources to meet professional development requirements and earn State Continuing Education Clock Hours.

== History ==
In 1998, Michigan governor John Engler and the Michigan Economic Development Corporation founded Michigan Virtual University to support the state's economic development efforts by providing convenient and cost-effective education and training to Michigan's current and future workforce.

MVU began to serve Michigan's K-12 community with online instructional services as a result of Public Act 230 of 2000. In 2005, the Michigan Virtual School was awarded accreditation by the North Central Commission on Accreditation and School Improvement (NCA) and the Commission on International and Trans-Regional Accreditation (CITA). MVS's accreditation was renewed in 2010.

In 2003, in partnership with Michigan Department of Education, MVU created Michigan LearnPort, a web-based portal that provides low-cost and no-cost online professional development opportunities for Michigan's K-12 community, higher education and for organizations not directly affiliated with K-12 or higher education.

In 2012, the Governor of Michigan and Michigan Legislature passed legislation requiring the Michigan Virtual University to establish a center for online learning research and innovation, known as the Michigan Virtual Learning Research Institute.

After redefining its mission and vision in 2004, MVU now serves the K-12 education community exclusively through the Michigan Virtual School, Michigan LearnPort and Michigan Virtual Learning Research Institute.

== Divisions ==
Michigan Virtual School (MVS): The Michigan Virtual School is an online resource that enables Michigan high schools and middle schools to provide courses (all taught by certified teachers) and other learning tools that students wouldn't otherwise have access to. It was funded by the Michigan Legislature in July 2000 to be operated by the Michigan Virtual University, a private, not-for-profit Michigan corporation. MVS works in cooperation with individual school districts to grant course credit and diplomas. Through MVS, Michigan high school and middle school students can take a variety of courses and learn any place there is a computer and an Internet connection.

As one of the largest virtual schools in the U.S., Michigan Virtual School offers more than 150 online courses, including unique courses like Chinese and CareerForward, an online career exploration course.

Michigan LearnPort: Michigan LearnPort was established by the State of Michigan in partnership with the Michigan Department of Education. Michigan LearnPort brings professional development to the K-12 educational community. Hosting a broad catalog of courses and collaborative tools, Michigan LearnPort provides online learning resources and solutions for educators.

Some courses in Michigan LearnPort are fee-based while most are free. New courses are added on a regular basis. Teachers are able to earn State-Board Continuing Education Credits (SB-CEUs) using Michigan LearnPort, while the State of Michigan grants the credit. Most of the courses in Michigan LearnPort are available for SCECHs (State Continuing Education Clock Hours), while some provide the opportunity to earn graduate credit. Resources valuable to classroom teachers include community rooms where participants can discuss and share best practices, and over 800 video and audio resources that demonstrate strategies and relay other K-12 related topics.

Michigan Virtual Learning Research Institute: In 2012, the Governor and Michigan Legislature passed legislation requiring the Michigan Virtual University to establish a center for online learning research and innovation, and through this center, directed MVU to work on a variety of projects.

Established in 1998, the core strategies of MVLRI are: Research — Expand the K-12 online and blended learning knowledge base through high quality, high-impact research; Policy — Inform local, state and national public education policy strategies that reinforce and support online and blended learning opportunities for the K-12 community; Innovation — Experiment with new technologies and online learning models to foster expanded learning opportunities for K-12 students; and Networks — Develop human and web-based applications and infrastructures for sharing information and implementing K-12 online and blended learning best practices.

== See also ==
- E-learning
- Virtual Learning Environment
- Learning Management System
