= WebCT =

Virtual learning environment

WebCT (Course Tools) or Blackboard Learning System, now owned by Blackboard, is an online proprietary virtual learning environment system that is licensed to colleges and other institutions and used in many campuses for e-learning. To their WebCT courses, instructors can add such tools as discussion boards, mail systems, and live chat, along with content including documents and web pages. The latest versions of this software are now called Webcourses. WebCT is significant in that it was the world's first widely successful course management system for higher education. At its height, it was in use by over 10 million students in 80 countries.

On September 30, 2025, it was reported that Blackboard's current parent company, Anthology, would be acquired by private equity firms Nexus Group and Oaktree Capital Management under a Chapter 11 bankruptcy reorganization, in which the company filed for bankruptcy that same day.

== Background ==
WebCT was originally developed at the University of British Columbia by a faculty member in computer science, Murray Goldberg. Goldberg is also the creator of Silicon Chalk (sold to Wimba (website)), Brainify (website), Marine Learning Systems (website) (sold to Bleecker Street Group (website)), and SkillGrader (website). In 1995, Goldberg began looking at the application of web-based systems to education. His research showed that student satisfaction and academic performance could be improved through the use of a web-based educational resource, or web-based course tools (from which the name WebCT is derived).{Goldberg, M., Salari, S. & Swoboda, P. (1996) ‘World Wide Web – Course Tool: An Environment for Building WWW-Based Courses’ Computer Networks and ISDN Systems, 28:7-11 pp1219-1231} In order to continue his research, he decided to build a system to ease the creation of web-based learning environments. This led to the first version of WebCT in early 1996, first presented at the 5th international World Wide Web conference in Paris during the spring of 1996. WebCT was originally written in Perl. This was a major reason for adoption, as users could easily modify it to their liking. Later it was changed to Java as otherwise the code could be read and not monetized as easily.

In 1997, Goldberg created a company, WebCT Educational Technologies Corporation, a spinoff company of UBC. Goldberg grew the company until 1999, at which point it served approximately 2-3 million students in 30 countries. In mid-1999, WebCT was acquired by ULT (Universal Learning Technology), a Boston-based company headed by Carol Vallone. Ms. Vallone continued to grow the company to the point where its product was used by over 10 million students in 80 countries. Goldberg resigned from his position of Canadian president of WebCT in 2002. In February 2006, WebCT was acquired by rival Blackboard Inc. As part of the acquisition terms with Blackboard, the WebCT name was phased out in favor of the Blackboard brand. The majority of WebCT users moved away from Blackboard LMS. Many selected an open source LMS.

== Textbooks and publishing ==
The software was used in electronic publishing. In order to use a textbook or other learning tool published in the WebCT format, some publishers require the student to purchase a password at the bookstore or to obtain it online. The software permitted integration of material prepared locally with material purchased from publishers.

== Criticisms ==
WebCT's user interface has been criticized as needlessly complex and unintuitive. The "Vista" version of the product represented an attempt to derive balance between flexibility and ease of use, however it has also been the target of ease-of-use criticisms.

Some WebCT criticisms which were apparent include problems using it in multiple tabs or browser windows, heavy reliance on Java for its user experience, usage of too many browser framesets, issues with some features requiring pop-up blockers to be turned off, and problems using standard browser navigation tools (i.e. the Back and Forward commands).

WebCT, like most of its competitors, does not meet all guidelines for accessibility; these include, but are not limited to, the following studies:

- Conformance of WebCT v3.6 to W3C's Authoring Tool Accessibility Guidelines 1.0(2001)
- Bringing Your WebCT Course into ADA Compliance: A Nuts and Bolts Approach (2001)
- An Accessibility Audit of WebCT (2002)
- Is WebCT Vista Accessible? (2006)
