= Progressive inquiry =

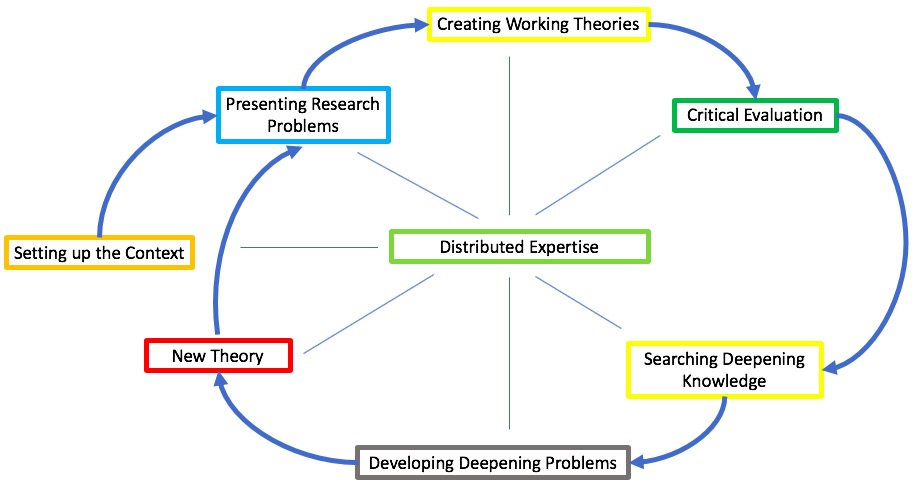
Progressive Inquiry model.

Progressive inquiry is a pedagogical model which aims at facilitating the same kind of productive knowledge practices of working with knowledge in education that characterize scientific research communities. It is developed by Professor Kai Hakkarainen and his colleagues in the University of Helsinki as a pedagogical and epistemological framework to support teachers and students in organizing their activities for facilitating expert-like working with knowledge.

The model emphasizes shared expertise and collaborative work for knowledge building and inquiry by setting up the context, using questions, explanations, theories, and scientific information in the cycle of deepening inquiry. It is often used with computer-supported collaborative learning so that the learners are working on their research questions and documenting their theories and findings to an online system. To demonstrate and test the progressive inquiry with computers, Aalto Media Lab's researchers designed and developed the Fle3 software.

The model has evolved from the initial cognitively oriented one toward versions that highlight pragmatic and socio-cultural aspects of inquiry. It describes the elements of expert-like knowledge practices in a form of a cyclic inquiry process. It relies on cognitive research on education and is closely associated with the knowledge building approach of Marlene Scardamalia, Carl Bereiter and the Interrogative Model of Inquiry introduced by Jaako Hintikka.

In a progressive inquiry process, the teacher creates a context for inquiry by presenting a multidisciplinary approach to a theoretical or real-life phenomenon, after which the students start defining their own questions and intuitive working theories about it. Students’ questions and explanations are shared and evaluated together, which directs the utilization of authoritative information sources and iterative elaboration of subordinate study questions and more advanced theories and explanations. The model is not meant prescriptively, as an ideal path to be followed rigidly; rather it offers conceptual tools to describe, understand and take into account the critical elements in collaborative knowledge-advancing inquiry.
