= Linda Harasim =

Linda Marie Harasim, is a "leading teacher, scholar and speaker on the theories and practices of online education, contributing knowledge, technologies, and practices to the field of technology-enabled learning," is a pioneer leading theorist of online education. She is a professor emerita in the School of Communication at Simon Fraser University (SFU) in Vancouver, British Columbia, Canada. Her six books and hundreds of articles about Computer-supported collaborative learning have been acknowledged as seminal works in the field.

== Early life and education ==
Harasim was born in 1949 in Edmonton, Canada. She received her bachelor's and master's degrees from the University of Alberta. In 1983, she received her PhD in Educational Theory from the University of Toronto.

Her interest in online learning began in 1983 while working as a senior researcher and assistant professor at the University of Toronto's Ontario Institute for Studies in Education.

== First Online Course ==
In 1986, Harasim designed and taught one of the first totally online university courses in the world at the University of Toronto. She co-taught the course with Dorothy E. Smith. The topic of the course was "Women and Computers in Education," which highlighted the lack of women in the field of educational computing.

The 13-week course focused on collaboration and communication among the students through asynchronous, text-based interactions. Through this course, Harasim developed her learning theory, Online Collaborative Learning (OCL) later known as Collaborativism.

== Online Collaborative Learning (OCL)/Collaborativism ==
Collaborativism is a learning theory about how students can learn through collaborative discourse in learning networks via the internet. Technology is used to augment human agency and build knowledge. Collaborativism emphasizes the process of students working together in an online environment to construct knowledge, propose innovative solutions, and solve problems. Unlike cooperative learning, in which individual members of a group divide projects into individual parts to create a whole, collaborativism focuses on the shared experience of the learning process, which eventually results in deep understanding of the content and the knowledge-building process itself.

=== Stages of Collaborativism ===
Collaborativism occurs in three stages:

==== Idea Generating ====
In the first stage of collaborativism, students begin with divergent thinking within a group. In this stage, students will generate or brainstorm their own position on a discussion topic. A wide range of views are presented.

==== Idea Organizing ====
In the second stage of collaborativism, students encounter a variety of information through viewing their peers' perspectives, teacher provided resources such as articles or videos, and any other sources of information brought forth by group members. During this stage, students will begin to explore new ideas, update existing beliefs, clarify positions of their classmates, and then eventually sort ideas to find the strongest arguments and weed out the weakest arguments.

==== Intellectual Convergence ====
In the third stage of collaborativism, students reach Intellectual Convergence by either coming to a consensus or an agreement to disagree on a particular position or group of key positions. The evidence of Intellectual Convergence may be presented in a variety of ways including a final paper, group presentation, policy statement, etc.

== Continued Work in Online Education ==
In 1987–1989, the University of Phoenix consulted with Harism to develop online pedagogy and small group discussion methodology. Harasim joined the faculty of SFU in 1990 and has been active in studying pedagogical approaches and developing the theory and research methods associated with Collaborative Learning in online environments.

Her books Educational Applications of Computer Networks (1986) and Online Education: Perspectives on a New Environment (1990) were amongst the first in the field.

In 1993, Harasim, along with Thomas W. Calvert, led a project to develop Virtual-U, a virtual learning environment customized to support collaborative learning. The Virtual-U software was used to support online courses and to prototype new educational social media environments and tools until 2014. It was also used by the Global Educators Network.

In 1995, Harasim founded and served as CEO of the TeleLearning Network of Centre of Excellence (TL*NCE) in Canada. The $50 million project was funded half by the Canadian federal government and half by other public and private sector sources. During its operation (1995–2003) TL*NCE funded hundreds of researchers from 32 universities in Canada and worked with participants from 225 public and private sector organizations. While CEO of the network, Harasim focused her research on 500 online courses that were conducted on Virtual-U. While performing this research she collaborated with Carl Bereiter and Marlene Scardamalia to further develop theoretical work in collaborative learning and knowledge building, especially the use of latent semantic analysis of online educational discourse.

Harasim has been a member of several prestigious boards and committees such as Canada's Social Sciences and Humanities Research Council.

Harasim currently publishes and undertakes research in "Understanding Digital Social Media and the Knowledge Society", "Digital Media Research Methods," and "Online Education," as well as communication and learning theories.

== Publications ==
- Harasim, L. (2011). Learning Theory and Online Technologies. Routledge, New York. ISBN 9780415999762
- Harasim, L. Hiltz, S.R., Teles, L. and Turoff, M. (2005). Redes de aprendizagem: Um guia para ensino e aprendizagem on-line. Portuguese. Editora Senac: São Paulo, Brazil.
- Harasim, L. Hiltz, S.R., Teles, L. and Turoff, M. (2000). Redes de aprendizaje – Guia para la enseanza y el aprendizaje en red. Spanish. Barcelona: Editorial Gedisa, Spain.
- Harasim, L., Hiltz, S.R., Teles, L. and Turoff, M. (1995). Learning Networks: A Field Guide to Teaching & Learning Online. Cambridge: MIT Press.
- Harasim, L. (1993). Global Networks: Computers and Communication. Cambridge: MIT Press. ISBN 9780262082228
- Harasim, L. (1990). Online Education: Perspectives on a New Environment. New York: Praeger Publishers. ISBN 9780275934484
- Harasim, L., and Johnson, E.M. (1986). Educational Applications of Computer Networks. Toronto: Ontario Ministry of Education Press.

A more complete bibliography can be found at ResearchGate.net and Academia.edu.
