= Fle3 =

Fle3 - Future Learning Environment
- Developer: Fle3 Team
- Stable release: 1.5 / April 2005
- Written in: Python
- Type: Collaborative software for learning
- License: GPL
- Website: http://fle3.uiah.fi

Fle3 is a Web-based learning environment or virtual learning environment. More precisely Fle3 is server software for computer supported collaborative learning (CSCL).

Fle3 is designed to support learner and group centered work that concentrates on creating and developing expressions of knowledge (i.e. knowledge artefacts). Fle3 supports study groups to implement knowledge building, creative problem solving and scientific method in an inquiry learning process, for example the progressive inquiry method.

Fle3 user interface is translated to more than 20 languages including most of the European languages and Chinese. Fle3 is used in more than 70 countries.

Fle3 is a Zope product, written in Python. Fle3 is open-source and free software released under the GNU General Public Licence (GPL).

== Origin of the name ==
The abbreviation FLE comes from the words Future Learning Environment. The number 3 in the name refers to the number of times the software has been built from scratch.

== Components ==
Fle3 provides various tab-accessed screens affording functionality considered important for progressive inquiry.

Fle3 WebTops the interface that scaffolds students' storing, organizing and sharing their own knowledge resources including documents, files, links and notes.

Fle3 Knowledge Building the interface that scaffolds students' knowledge building (and associated) discourse. Knowledge Building tool provides Knowledge Types to scaffold and structure the process.

Fle3 Jamming tool is the interface that scaffolds members of a group to collaboratively construct and improve digital artifacts such as pictures, text, audio and videos. Key features of this include the ability of a user to upload the artifact, assign sharing permission and finally the graphical representation of the versioning history of the artifact.

There are also interfaces that scaffold teachers and administrators to manage users and analyze student/project activity.

== Knowledge type sets ==
An important feature of the Knowledge Building tool is the knowledge type sets that are scaffolding and structuring the discussions. For instance, for a progressive inquiry learning teachers may use knowledge type set designed for this purpose. Progressive Inquiry knowledge type set contains the following five knowledge types: Problem, My Explanation, Scientific Explanation, Evaluation of the Process and Summary. Every time a pupil is posting something to the discussion, she must choose what knowledge type her note represents.

The knowledge types guides pupils to think adequate and important things related to the process, and this way helps them to write more substantial notes to the discussion forum. As an aid for users to follow the knowledge building discourse, users may take different views to the knowledge building discussion by sorting the notes as a discussion thread, by writer, by knowledge type, or by date.

The Knowledge Building tool contains two default knowledge type sets: (1) Progressive Inquiry, and (2) Design Thinking. Depending on the selected knowledge types set, users get guidelines and a checklist on how to write their notes to the discussion forum. Each knowledge type is also color-coded making them fast to recognize and learn.

== History ==
Development of Fle3 software was started in 1998 in a Future Learning Environment research and development project in Media Lab, Helsinki, Finland. Fle3 software is based on the Future Learning Environment concept promoting learning process, which differs from traditional teacher and didactic-based teaching by emphasising students active role in a learning process.

The objective was to study alternative approaches of using information and communication technologies (ICT) in teaching and learning, and to design alternative learning practices and tools. At that time, the strong e-learning movement was seen to promote rather naïve conception of human learning. The acquisition metaphor of learning, which emphasizes learning as a process where students are supplied with pieces of knowledge, was getting stronger.

The researchers of the FLE project brought to the discussion more advanced conceptions of learning, such as participation metaphor and knowledge creation metaphor . However, the objective of the FLE project was not only to bring new theoretical approaches to the discussion, but also to design learning practices and technology based on the theories. The results of this work culminated in the progressive inquiry learning model and in the Fle3 software.

The history of virtual learning environments shows how the e-learning and Learning Management Systems (LMS), with course-centred outlook and focus on delivery of learning content, was, and is probably still, the mainstream approach to use of ICT in education. Although in mid-2000 the growing popularity of blogs and wikis and the consideration how they could be used in teaching and learning has led the mainstream research and development community of virtual learning to re-consider the existing e-learning paradigms.

=== Fle-Tools (1998–1999) ===
In the late 1990s the research, development and design team members of the first FLE project were greatly influenced by the work of Carl Bereiter and Marlene Scardamalia, and their concept of Knowledge building. In the design of FLE software, Bereiter's and Scardamalia's Computer-Supported Intentional Learning Environment (CSILE) was used as a reference.

However, there are also many differences between the two software. For instance, already in the early design specifications of FLE there was the idea of shared artefacts that are collaboratively constructed alongside the knowledge building activities. In FLE vocabulary the activity, and the tool supporting it, is called “jamming”. Also the idea of archiving the results of the study work and to make them then available for other study groups makes FLE very different from the CSILE, which was primary designed to be a system used in a classroom. Another difference is related to the Web. From the very beginning FLE has been web-based system, and has taken in use all the advantages the flexible platform is offering, whereas the original CSILE was a client-server system.

The first prototype server with FLE software was set up in 1998 and announced in early 1999. The software was named to be Fle-Tools. The software was designed in Media Lab in Helsinki but programmed by a Finnish company called NSD Consulting Oy.

Fle-Tools was developed in a Future Learning Environment project funded by Tekes - the National Technology Agency of Finland. The project partners were Media Lab of the University of Art and Design Helsinki (coordinator), Centre for Research on Networked Learning and Knowledge Building in the Department of Psychology of the University of Helsinki, Finnish Ministry of Education, Finnish new media company Grey Interactive, Finnish teleoperator Sonera, and Finnish educational publisher SanomaWSOY.

Fle-Tools was described to be: (1) www-based service for computer supported collaborative learning (CSCL); (2) on-line learning community and teamwork environment; (3) collection of server-based applications and databases and (4) cross-platform for end users (www-browser in Linux, Mac, Win PC, WebTV, Nokia Communicator, etc.). The tools of Fle3-Tools were:

- WebTop: Personal open desk top in the web to store and share digital materials;
- Knowledge Building: Asynchronous conferencing system with 'Categories of Inquiry' and different searching capabilities (by date, person, category of inquiry, users own notes, answers to own notes);
- Jam Session: Asynchronous multi-user environment for collaborative design, writing, software development, etc.;
- Library: Adaptive medium to publish and browse multimedia course materials
- Administration: Tools for administer users, groups, courses and course materials.

In 1999 Fle-Tools was tested in several university course at the University of Helsinki and the University of Art and Design Helsinki. The results form the pilots were published in scientific conferences and journals.

In the end of 1999, The Finnish operator Sonera, who was a key partner in the Future Learning Environment project, decided to draw back from the project and started to develop their own product based on Fle-Tools. This resulted as a breakdown of the original Future Learning Environment research and development project.

=== Fle2 (1999–2001) ===
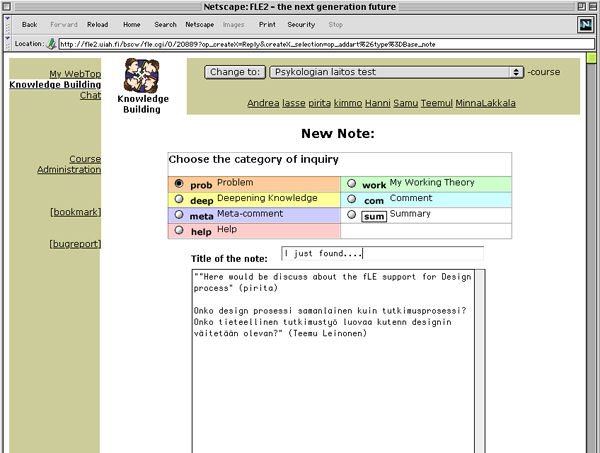
Fle2 (2001) Knowledge Building - Add note view.

The next generation FLE software was developed during the years 1999–2001. Because of the collapse of the original Future Learning Environment project consortium in 1999 the research and design partners felt that they must continue the FLE development on their own.

In 2000 the Fle2 project got funding from the Nordic Council of Ministers NordUnet 2 program. The partners of the project were Media Lab in Helsinki, Department of Communication, Journalism and Computer Science of Roskilde University in Denmark, and Department of Psychology of the University of Helsinki.

The new software was named Fle2 and released online for free downloading in April 2001. Fle2 was based on the design of Fle-Tools, but this time the software development and programming was carried-out in Media Lab Helsinki. The Fle2 was built on top of the BSCW - Basic Support for Cooperative Work software developed by the Fraunhofer Society in Germany.

The tools of Fle2 were personal WebTops and Knowledge Building. Th Fle2 did not have Jam Session or Library tools of the earlier Fle-Tools. In the Fle2 WebTop there were two new features compared to the earlier Fle-Tools: (1) "yellow notes" made it possible to add notes to other people WebTops when visiting them, and (2) chat with whiteboard for chatting and drawing with other users online.

In 2002 the design and development team in Helsinki realized that BSCW was not the right platform for developing the FLE software. The main reason for giving up the development of Fle2 on top of the BSCW was that BSCW was not an Open Source / Free Software.

=== Fle3 (2002–2006) ===
Fle3 (2001) Jamming tool.

Fle3 is the third and the latest version of FLE software. The first version of Fle3 was released on February 15, 2002. The latest version 1.5 was released in April 2005.

Fle3 was largely developed in the Innovative Technology for Collaborative Learning and Knowledge Building (ITCOLE) project, funded by the European Commission in the Information Society Technologies (IST) framework's 'School of Tomorrow' program.

The ITCOLE project was coordinated by the Media Lab in Helsinki. The technical development partners included the developers of BSCW – Basic Support for Cooperative Work in Fraunhofer Society and Department of Computer Science of the University of Murcia in Spain. Testing of different software in schools was coordinated by Helsinki City Education Department and pedagogical research was carried out by researcher from University of Helsinki, University of Amsterdam, University of Salerno, University of Rome La Sapienza, University of Athens and University of Utrecht.

In the ITCOLE project there were several parallel software development projects. At first Fle3 was developed in Media Lab in Helsinki as a user interface and interaction demonstration for the main software development taking place in Fraunhofer and based on their BSCW system. The University of Murcia's main task was to develop the synchronous communications tools, which were then integrated experimentally to BSCW and Fle3. The software based on BSCW was named at first Synergeia and later BSCL (Basic Support for Collaborative Learning).

During the course of the project Fle3 was found user friendly, accessible, and technically reliable for a wider use. This way it ended up to be not only a UI and interaction prototype but also software of its own. Finally Fle3 became one of the main results of the ITCOLE project.

There has been no noticeable development in the Fle3 project since 2006.

=== Fle4 (2009–2015) ===
The core component of FLE3, the scaffolded knowledge-building discussion board, was re-created as a simple plugin in WordPress , an open source web server system. FLE4 was not intended to be a new system, but instead a re-implementation of the most important element of the previous system in a more user-friendly approach. Two sets of scaffolds are available in FLE4: Knowledge Building with its 5 knowledge types and de Bono's Six Hat Thinking with its 6 knowledge types.

In 2013, a map view was added, providing an automatically generated 2D view of the discussion in which users can both view and post. While FLE4 is not under active development (2015), occasional updates and bug fixes are released.
