= Knowledge Forum =

- Developer: IKIT
- Stable release: 4.8
- Operating system: Cross-platform

Knowledge Forum is an educational software designed to help and support knowledge building communities. Previously, the product was called Computer Supported Intentional Learning Environments (CSILE). It was designed for a short period of time by York University and continued at the Ontario Institute for Studies in Education, University of Toronto, to support knowledge building pedagogies, practices and research designated in this area. In 1983, CSILE was prototyped in a university course and in 1986 it was used for the first time in an elementary school, as a full version. CSILE was considered the first networked system designed for collaborative learning (Carl Bereiter webpage). The main contributors were Marlene Scardamalia and Carl Bereiter.

In 1995, the software was redesigned in accordance to World Wide Web philosophy by OISE in cooperation with Learning in Motion. The new generation was called Knowledge Forum (KF). Knowledge Forum is an asynchronous Computer-mediated communication (CMC) technology that provides a shared discourse environment. It facilitates collaborative knowledge-building strategies, textual and graphical representation of ideas, and reorganization of knowledge artifacts.

The product is now used in a variety of social contexts in 19 countries in the Americas, Europe, Asia, Australia and New Zealand. The Institute for Knowledge Innovation and Technology (IKIT) from OISE is the research group that takes charge of future developments of Knowledge Forum.

== Specifications ==
Knowledge Forum (KF) Server is implemented for Windows, Mac and Linux platforms, while the latest version (KF 4.8) has a Client written in as a hybrid of Java applet and web pages. KF can be used as an e-learning system or as an in-class technology. For each class and course there is a database, individually assigned for each entity.

The main feature of the product is called note. With notes, users can do the followings:

- Offer various options of finding for existing notes
- Write a new note
- Co-author, when more users share the authorship for the same note
- Reference and quote an existing note
- Annotate allows users to comment on an existing note without creating a new one.
- Reply (built-on) on a specific note.
- Rise-above notes which subsume sets of related notes.

The main technique that KF uses is called scaffolding (Scardamalia, 2004). Learners use a specific set of scaffolds that directs other toward cognitive operations that will help them to improve their understanding. The basic set of scaffolds is the following one:

- My theory
- I need to understand
- New information
- This theory cannot explain
- A better theory
- Putting our knowledge together

== Software features ==
Knowledge Forum has some basic components that all Learning Management Systems have. It has facilities for posting messages, searching for notes, uploading documents, and online assignments. However, KF is not a typical LMS. Some features (such as grade book, live chat, student information, and the integration into a larger network of users) are not implemented.

Knowledge Forum is not committed to be a traditional LMS. According with its purposes, KF is grounded on knowledge building theory. The software helps students in their effort to acquire new meaning and nurture knowledge building communities. In consequence, Knowledge Forum requires that learners and instructors take an approach in concordance with knowledge building theory.

Currently in version 4.8 in beta-testing the major version 5 is in progress.

== Pedagogical approaches ==
Knowledge Forum can be used in different areas such as:

- Education, from grade 1 to graduate students
- Healthcare
- Business

According to Bereiter and Scardamalia (2003) "a comprehensive knowledge building environment would provide a means of initiating students into a knowledge-creating culture—to make them feel a part of humankind’s long-term effort to understand their world and gain some control over their destiny" (p. 18).

== Other e-learning platforms ==
- Alphastudy
- ANGEL Learning
- Blackboard Learn
- Desire2Learn
- Fle3
- Moodle
- OLAT
- OpenOLAT
- Sakai Project
- WebCT

== See also ==
- Knowledge building
- OISE
- Marlene Scardamalia
- Carl Bereiter
- Computer-supported collaborative learning
