= Assessment in computer-supported collaborative learning =

Assessment in computer-supported collaborative learning (CSCL) environments is a subject of interest to educators and researchers. The assessment tools utilized in computer-supported collaborative learning settings are used to measure groups' knowledge learning processes, the quality of groups' products and individuals' collaborative learning skills.

== Perspective ==
Traditional assessment is equated with individualized exams and evaluations. However, in online collaborative learning, assessment requires a broader perspective as it encompasses the collaborative interactions using asynchronous and synchronous communications between group members. Assessment has been found to have a significant effect on CSCL by motivating learners through accountability and constructive feedback. It supports students in growing familiar with the course content through discourse and effectively encourages the participation of students.

== Four metaphors of CLCS ==
There are four metaphors of Assessment of (Computer-Supported) Collaborative Learning such as:

a.acquisition metaphor

b.the participation metaphor

c. the knowledge creation metaphor

d.a sociocultural-based group cognition metaphor.

The usage of the acquisition metaphor during the learning process is directly connected to the accumulation of knowledge in the students`mind. Learning is evaluated based on the individual gain.

The participation metaphor emphasis that the learning process does not only happen in an individual or isolated environment but in an interactive socio-cultural environment where the students participate and collaborate with each-other.

The knowledge creation metaphor focuses mostly on the collaborative activities. There are cases when the individual activities are stressed as well in terms of students as individuals who collaborate and interact actively during the learning process.

A socio-cultural-based group cognition metaphor refers to the individuals`participation during the learning process who share meaning, ideas and opinions to the other members of the group.

== Instructor's role in CSCL assessment ==
A paradigm shift occurs in the assessment of the products and processes in CSCL. In the traditional educational setting, final assessment is performed exclusively by the instructor.(p. 232) In CSCL, the instructor designs, facilitates, direct instruction and provide technical guidance. The participants take an active role in setting the standard criteria for assessing individual and group learning.

== Intelligent Support For CSCL Assessment ==
The teacher's assessment should include its function (summative or formative), type (peer assessment, portfolios, learning journals), format (rating scales, rubrics, feedback), focus (cognitive/social or motivational processes) and degree of student involvement (self, peer, co-.teacher assessment) are very essential.

== Technology use in CSCL assessment ==
Various technologies may provide information that may be used for assessment purposes. For example, email, computer conferencing systems, bulletin boards, and hypermedia can be used as media for communication between group members in CSCL classrooms.(p. 13). This technology can be used to keep a record of the students' interactions. This interaction record enables the instructor and students in assessing a learner's participation and collaboration with the group.(p. 664).

== Process assessment vs. product assessment ==
In CSCL settings, the relative value of the collaborative process and the product must be appropriately balanced. The pedagogical principle in CSCL environments is the assumption that knowledge is constructed through social negotiation and discussion with others. This social interaction encourages critical thinking and understanding.(p. 309) When learning occurs through social interaction, knowledge building can also be observed through text analysis or discourse analysis. One way to assess knowledge construction in online collaborative settings is by collecting and analyzing the discursive events recorded and kept as history in computer conferencing systems in the form of virtual artifact. Transcripts can be used to determine the quantity and quality of interactions in negotiating meaning of the course material.(p. 379) The instructor evaluates the messages exchanged by the students for meaningfulness and pertinence in regards to the target content.

== Assessment of the process ==
Instructors can use discourse analysis to assess the students' learning of the collaborative process itself. The instructor can make use of the dialogue to look for cues of collaboration: support and respect in their criticisms, consideration of other teammates' opinions, negotiation of meaning, demonstration of mutual understanding, achievement of consensus, problem-solving, and time and task management issues. Another consideration in assessing students' collaborative skills, is the students' competence in online collaboration. As proficiency develops in progressive stages, the instructor can design the assessment to account for the students' developing competence in progressive steps throughout the online collaborative process.(p. 378)

== Assessment of the product ==
Collaborative products can be used to assess learners' knowledge acquisition. The products can be: a concept map, a report, a research paper, an essay, a wiki, a website, etc. Two assessable elements of collaborative product are the overall quality of the collaborative product and the contributions of each individual.(p. 386) Each member of the group must participate in the collaborative activities. The products created by groups of students in CSCL contexts cannot be used as the sole evidence of knowledge acquisition. Although a quality product may be important, it is the process that generates the actual learning."(p. 170)

== Self and peer assessment ==
Self assessment in CSCL, students taking responsibility of learning by evaluating and judging aspects of their own learning activity. In peer assessment, individuals take into account the quantity and quality of their own product or performance. In CSCL, these two types of assessments are dynamically interrelated. The aim of self and peer assessments in CSCL is to improve students' learning, and develop individual learning skills as well as grading individual learning outcomes. Self and peer assessment:

1. drives students' learning;
2. aids students in recognizing individual potential and sharing collaborative work effectively and efficiently;
3. enables instructors to perceive the effect of individual learning through discourse;
4. informs the instructor of the students' opinion change and skill improvement that occurs through adversity in the online collaborative process;
5. develops students as retrospective thinkers.

== Group work assessment ==
Group work assessment in CSCL measures the quantity and quality of students' learning as a team. Group work or teamwork is a collaborative learning situation in which students share the task of developing a product presented at the end of the course. Group work is not measured and interpreted independently but evaluated with other assessment tools, and plays a role in assisting learners' to reflect on their learning process. Group work assessment:

1. diagnoses the collaborative learning process and shows the instructor what works and what does not;
2. identifies and corrects destructive conflict in collaborative learning;
3. facilitates learners' reflection making the collaborative task effective and efficient;
4. allows the instructor to monitor the collaborative learning processes and gather the information about individual performance and contributions to product quality.

== E-portfolio assessment ==
E-portfolio can be used in assessment of CSCL activities by showing students' growth or proficiency in learning. Organizing information about individual students, the instructor keeps track of the student's learning process. These portfolios are managed online and are referred to as electronic portfolio, digital portfolio, or web-portfolio. In using E-portfolios in CSCL assessment an instructor determines:

1. purpose;
2. type;
3. choice of items to include;
4. guidelines or criteria;
5. impact on the teacher and students;
6. self-reflection component.

== Collaborative Learning ==
Collaborative Learning (CL) is a useful practice which is common at all levels of education. The latest developments in the field of Technology lead to a new discipline which is known as ComputerSupported Collaborative Learning (CSCL).The usage of computers during the Collaborative Learning (CL) established a shift in the methodology that the teachers used to have during their learning processes as well as an understanding of how group work affects individual and group cognition.

Assessment in Computer-supported collaborative learning (CSCL) environments is shaped by:

a.what is measured

b.its purpose.

The entire process distinguishes two important purposes:

1.formative

2.summative.

Summative assessment(assessment of learning) is described as individualistic and decontextualized which is realized in an isolated way from the learning process. It is used at the end of the course and its main purpose is to check the students`progression throughout the entire learning process. In other words how well the students performed. Summative assessment focuses mostly on the cognitive approaches which are used to educate the students. It is designed by the teacher who uses only a single performance score.

On the other hand, Formative assessment (assessment for learning) is contextualized and represents a picture of the learners` features. It is the most essential part of the learning process which is used by the teacher several times to evaluate the students` knowledge. Formative assessment is not used only at the end of the course. It comprises motivational, social and cognitive aspects of the learning process. Also, this type of assessment doesn`t use only a single score but creates a profile for each student.
