= Media lab =

Media lab may refer to:

- Media lab, or new media lab or media research lab, a type of computer lab with a focus on new media, digital culture and technology
- MIT Media Lab, a research laboratory at the Massachusetts Institute of Technology, United States
- Media Lab Europe, a former research laboratory in Dublin, Ireland
- Aalto Media Lab, a research laboratory in Aalto University, Finland
- médialab, a research center at Sciences Po, in Paris, France
- Medialab Matadero, formerly Medialab-Prado, a cultural space and citizen lab in Madrid, Spain
