= Opportunistic collaboration =

Opportunistic collaboration is a flexible, emergent design for collaborative learning. In this process, groups form, break up, and recombine as part of an emerging process, with all participants aware of and helping to advance the structure of the whole. This is different from fixed, small group collaboration, in which groups are often fixed for the duration of the inquiry, with a pre-specified culminating task, and a fixed stage-model of inquiry with a time-line for each stage, making clear who will do what, in what format and by when.

Opportunistic collaboration is emerging in knowledge organizations. As Chatzkel (2003) asserted, a knowledge organization “needs to nurture its people so that they feel free to move about in their organization, to group and regroup in different configurations as needed, and to rework themselves and their resources in concert with their new conditions.” (p. 20) It is a promising direction to explore this design in educational contexts. A recent study (Zhang et al., 2006) indicated that the opportunistic collaboration model led to a high level of collective responsibility, more pervasive, flexible, distributed collaborations, and greater diffusion of information and knowledge advances.

== Related concepts ==
- Computer-supported collaborative learning
- Collaborative learning
