= Group cognition =

Linguistic phenomenon

Group cognition is a social, largely linguistic phenomenon whereby a group of people produce a sequence of utterances that performs a cognitive act. That is, if a similar sequence was uttered or thought by an individual it would be considered an act of cognition or thinking. The group can be a small group, such as 3–5 people talking together or working together online. The group can also be a larger collective. The theory of group cognition is a postcognitivism philosophy, which considers a larger unit of analysis than an individual mind as a producer of cognitive activities such as creative problem solving.

== Concepts ==
Group cognition is an analytic viewpoint that looks beyond individual cognition to include the interaction of individuals with other people, with artifacts and with cultural resources as producing cognitive products through their interaction. Accordingly, cognition or thinking can be analyzed in a number of ways:

- An individual thinks and speaks. The thought takes place in the individual’s mind (inside the head) and can be expressed in the (external) world through speech, gesture, writing, artifacts. This has been a traditional cognition view since Descartes.
- A small group of people collaborates, usually through spoken or written communication, and produces utterances or other products that cannot be attributed to any one of the group members by themselves. The individuals may build on each other’s ideas (transaction). Also, there may be group processes or features of the group interaction, which themselves contribute to the small-group cognition.
- One or more people may interact with various kinds of artifacts, such as software applications or software agents, resulting in extended cognition.
- One or more people may interact within a social setting, such as a culture or a socio-technical system, resulting in social cognition or situated learning.
- Larger groups of people, artifacts and cultural settings (activity systems) may interact, resulting in collective intelligence or distributed cognition.

== See also ==
- Computer-Supported Collaborative Learning (CSCL)
- Cultural-Historical Activity Theory (CHAT)
- Distributed Cognition
- Situated cognition
- Collective intelligence
- Actor-network theory
- Language
- Macrocognition
