= Knowledge environment =

Knowledge environments are social practices, technological and physical arrangements intended to facilitate collaborative knowledge building, decision making, inference or discovery, depending on the epistemological premises and goals.

== Overview ==
Knowledge environments departing from constructivist epistemology assume that domain knowledge is built in and results from cognitive and/or social practices. From this perspective the primary purpose of knowledge environments is to host and support activities of knowledge building, the means including cognitive ergonomics, social software, immediate information access exploiting means of multimedia and hypertext, content contribution functionalities and structured ontologies. Wikipedia itself is a prototypical example of a knowledge environment in this sense.

From another perspective, the purpose of a knowledge environment can be defined as a method to facilitate consistent knowledge outcomes. Knowledge outcomes reveal themselves as learning, communication, goals, decisions, etc. Consistent knowledge outcomes imply predictable learning results or replicable communication results and predictable quality of decisions. The design of knowledge environments is both commonplace activity and specialised expert work. At a simplistic level every teacher, every author, every librarian and every database manager is a creator of a knowledge environment. At a specialized level, knowledge environments need sophisticated architecture and modeling capabilities. This approach is necessary when the creator of the knowledge environment wants to deliver replicable results in hundreds of specific instances of the same knowledge environment. On the other hand, the strengthening trend of public authorship leads to open-ended ontologies by means of, say, tagging or folksonomies. In a significant sense, knowledge environments are in such cases created not only by their authors or owners but also by the contributors of their ontologies.

== Types ==
There are various kinds of knowledge environments:

- Socio-technological environments, e.g. Virtual Learning Environments, of which the goal is collaborative knowledge building
- Learning environments where the main goal of the participants is to gain some kind of knowledge, skill, or conceptual clarity
- Virtual environments incorporating communities of participation in, e.g., political processes
- Creative or experimental environments in which knowledge is constructed by means of collaborative authoring of text, but even non-verbal, e.g. audiovisual content
- Online simulations of ecology, economy, or society
- Knowledge-intensive gaming environments
- Communication environments where the main goal of the participants is to transmit to each other some signals or information related to the activities and behavior being generated in that environment
- Decisional environments where the main goal of the participants is to share knowledge and opinions such that decision options are generated and choices made
- Operating environments where the knowledge environment is a support or enabler for the actual process or physical work being carried out

== Issues of development ==
=== Variables ===
Knowledge environments are all pervasive but difficult to build on a scalable and a replicable basis. This is because of two groups of interacting variables:

- Variables associated with diversity of context
- Variables associated with the consequent multiplicity of perspectives to the domains in question
- Variables associated with complexity of domain

=== Issues ===
Some of the issues in development are:

- How to create a knowledge environment that acknowledges the diversity in participants, and the consequent multiplicity of perspectives to given domain of information
- How to facilitate exploration of multiple perspectives to domains of information
- How to optimize cognitive economics
- How to measure effectiveness of a knowledge environment
- How to integrate multiple media
- How to give users of such environments freedom to discover knowledge in such an environment while placing them within an operating structure

== Applications ==
Knowledge environments are useful for designing:

- Learning
- Knowledge management
- Scenario planning in companies
- Decision gaining tools
- Simulations
- Games
- Surrounding
