= Virtual Collaborative Learning =

Similar to computer-supported collaborative learning (CSCL), virtual collaborative learning environments aim to produce technology-based learning processes where participants can work together as a group to construct and share knowledge (Ghaoui 2003, pp. 43). Such environments “provide a rich opportunity for collaborative knowledge building, particularly through peer-to-peer dialogue.

In context of virtual collaborative learning, virtual structures and spaces are designed for individual and collaborative learning activities (Dirckinck-Holmfeld & Fibiger 2002, pp. 177).

Virtual collaborative learning in terms of problem-oriented project work in groups facilitated is becoming increasingly common in distributed learning settings where participants are physically in different locations.

The basic affordances of virtual collaborative learning are to have the ability to synchronously and asynchronously communicate via an array of electronic tools, e.g.: group and discussion chats, wikis, and blogs, where application transparency is essential. The main barrier to virtual collaborative learning is the difficulty in achieving agreement when diverse viewpoints, cultural boundaries, acuity of thoughts, or different working and cognitive learning styles exist.

Virtual collaborative learning systems can be divided into two main categories: action-oriented from where the participant’s knowledge is captured and shared or text-oriented which focuses on participants sharing knowledge via written communication. Within these categories, the participants may use a range of tools for both synchronous (e.g. chat, telephone conference, video conference) and asynchronous (e.g. threaded forum, document pool, e-mail) communication.

The evolution of virtual collaborative learning systems will depend upon the participant's cognitive processes. The participant may adapt to the technology to change the way that they learn or the participant may utilize their learning and collaborative situation to optimize use the technology.

== See also ==
- Collaborative workspace
- Computer-supported collaborative learning
- E-Learning
- Virtual Learning Environment
