= Mobile computer-supported collaborative learning =

Mobile computer-supported collaborative learning may have different meanings depending on the context in which it is applied. Mobile CSCL includes any in-class and out-of-class use of handheld mobile devices such as cell phones, smart phones, and personal digital assistants (PDAs) to enable collaborative learning.

== Overview ==
The adoption of mobile devices as tools for teaching and learning is referred to as M-Learning. M-Learning is a rapidly emerging educational technology trend. The New Media Consortium has listed adoption of mobiles for teaching and learning on a "One Year or Less" Adoption Horizon. M-Learning research comprises a range of mobile devices and teaching and learning applications. However, the research available for collaborative applications that involve mobile devices is limited. Examples of collaborative mobile learning applications can be found in examples from early adoption of PDA technology, and in recent examples of location-based, mobile collaborative games.

== History ==
Wireless-enabled handheld devices have been used as early as 2004 to facilitate collaborative learning. Devices such as PDAs and PocketPC's traditionally lack cellular connectivity, but are capable of wireless connectivity. This connectivity enables collaborative learning through software-based, decision-making tools and shared display of learning material.

=== Elementary school learners ===
Wireless interconnected handhelds have been used to foster collaborative construction of words among elementary school students. Students in a first grade classroom in Chile were organized into groups and asked to construct words from syllables. Each student was issued a handheld which identified their group and presented one syllable. Students had to read the syllable and communicate with the rest of their group and decide the appropriate syllable sequence required for word formation. The mobile system employed incorporated a group-based answer approval system that allowed students to submit responses and decide whether more words could be created from the available syllables.

=== Middle school learners ===
Cooties, is an interactive, collaborative simulation designed for wireless handheld devices. Originally designed for middle-school students, Cooties enables students to study the spread of infectious diseases. In Cooties, a teacher can select which student(s) to infect and which students to give "degrees of 'immunity'". The device displays icons for all students, and differentiates those with and without infection. As students move about, they "spread" disease. As the simulation progresses, students can then form a scientific hypothesis about how the disease is spread.

=== High school learners ===
Networked handhelds can be used to mediate collaborative group decision-making for science problems. Students in a high-school physics class in Chile were issued networked PocketPCs and organized into groups. Students in each group were asked to answer the same multiple choice physics question. Students could only proceed once the group established consensus on an answer.

The software was further developed to mediate the interaction of students in small-groups facilitating their collaboration in activities related to different subject areas. In these activities the groups of students share a set of questions that includes multiple responses that they have to analyze and decide the answer they want to submit as a group. This requires shared commitment and individual responsibility in order to make collective decisions and reach consensus. The methodology uses technology-supported face-to-face collaborative learning as a tool for the assessment of learning.

=== Museum learners ===
Several research projects have been conducted on handheld devices for applications in museum learning. Musex is an application in which elementary school students can enhance their understanding of exhibits by collaboratively (in pairs) answering related questions via PDA in museums. Musex enables students to monitor each other's status and allows them to move around different exhibits in museums at their own pace. Musex not only promotes the interaction between the students and the exhibits with low interactivity, but also facilitates the mutual communication between students themselves.

== Current trends ==
Results from the quarterly 2011 Mobile Intent Index survey indicate that mobile internet users are most likely to use devices as a "social connector". However, mobile users were less likely than non-mobile internet users to use mobile devices to learn. The following trends identified regarding mobile learning are notable:

- 64% indicated an intent to educate themselves.

- 69% indicated an intent to do research

- 95% indicated an intent to keep informed.

In 2010, Project Tomorrow conducted the Speak Up 2010 national survey, and invited participation from students, parents, teachers, librarians, administrators and technologists from private and public education sectors. Respondents identified mobile device usage as a key teaching and learning trend. Sixty-four percent of those surveyed indicated its importance to facilitate communicate in support of learning. In the eSchool Media STAR (School Technology Action) Report analysis of the survey, "48 percent of high school students and 34 percent of middle school students" used social networks such Facebook to collaborate with other students on class projects.

=== Location-based collaborative mobile games ===
Location-based mobile games mediate play through the use of mobile devices at specified locations. Use of collaborative location-based games rely on the availability of Wireless or GPS connections to enable players to receive and share game information. Rooted in the discipline of geomatics, geospatial games prompt students to tackle environmental issues such as climate change and sustainable development by situating collaborative play in outdoor spaces. One way to create location-based games is by creating social scavenger hunts using the SCVNGR software on iOS and Android mobile devices.

=== Groundwater survivor ===
Groundwater Survivor, a game located on the University of Guam campus, asks middle school students to collaborate to find fresh water. Students play the role of "shipwreck" survivors who are looking for sources of fresh water. Along the way, they must determine potential water sources, and must decide between contaminated and potable water sources.

- Collaborative play is designed with the Wherigo mobile platform.
- Game software is compatible with Garmin GPS handsets and HP IPAQ devices.

=== Mentira ===
Designed as an iOS application, Mentira is an augmented reality game designed to help University of New Mexico students learn to speak Spanish. In the project Taking Language Learning Out of the Classroom and Into the Streets, students are immersed in solving the mystery that is Mentira. Situated in Albuquerque, New Mexico, players must interact with real people and collect clues to help them solve the mystery, and in the process read and interact with the application in Spanish. Mentira was developed using the ARIS iOS game platform.

=== Foreign language learners ===
A mobile-device-supported peer-assisted learning (MPAL) system runs on tablet computers and is used to facilitate collaborative reading activities of elementary English as a foreign language (EFL) learners. An MPAL system consists of a phonological-skills training module and a peer-assessment module. Online helpers (typically more advanced students) can assist their peers in the peer-assessment module via Skype. While evaluating their peers' oral reading, online helpers identify mispronounced words by marking the words with a stylus. The MPAL system is then used to assess the readers' performance as a "fail" or "pass" based on the accuracy ratio provided. MPAL successfully promotes EFL learners' motivation to improve reading skills, and makes them engaged in reading activities; thereby ensuring that learners have timely online assistance anytime and anywhere.

== Collaborating in discussion boards on a mobile device ==
Discussion boards provide the ability for students to collaborate with others and build knowledge collectively. Although students may use personal computers to participate in discussion boards, computer-based discussions do not offer frequent, integrated access to learning applications anytime, and anywhere. Mobile devices help students to keep up-to-date with the current discussions and eliminate the accumulation of unread messages. Mobile use of discussion boards promotes collaborative learning by making it easier for students to interact with each other.

== Mobile blogging and collaborative learning ==
Blogging encourages collaboration in a variety of learning settings. Mobile blogging enables students to publish, view, and respond to comments anytime and anywhere. The mobility offered through mobile blogging greatly enhances communication and interaction in several ways. Mobile blogging augments physical space through information exchange, coherently aggregates the efforts made by all students, and archives student work for future reference. Collaborative learning through mobile blogging provides a positive emotional experience for students, and makes it easier for them to learn cooperative skills, even when they do not meet face-to-face.

== In-class collaborative mobile learning ==
An audience response system (ARS) is a system in which learners are able to provide instantaneous feedback via a mobile device to questions posed by an instructor. After students submit feedback (typically to multiple choice or true-false questions), the instructor can display the submitted feedback anonymously in diagram form.Â Applications of ARS include administrative uses (i.e. taking attendance), formative assessment (i.e. what is the answer to this question?), and collaborative questions. Given the potential of enhancing learning through the use of an ARS, many instructors have shown a keen interest in the collaborative application of the technology. One notable collaborative application of an ARS is a method called peer instruction (PI).

Developed by Eric Mazur and his group, PI emphasizes the interaction between students as a key component to the learning process. In a typical scenario, an instructor first provides new content in a short lecture. Students individually provide a response to the instructor's questions, then, afterwards, collaboratively discuss their answers in a small group before submitting group answers to the questions. Students' feedback is provided by a mobile device linked to an ARS. PI prescribes that the student interaction involves student defending their chosen answer so as to arrive eventually at a consensus for the group's response to the question. One other notable collaborative application of an ARS is the method Assessing-to-Learn (A2L).

A2L takes a slightly different approach from PI with regard to learner collaboration. Instead of having learners debate each other for a group answer, the A2L method has learners working on a problem related to the question presented to the learners during a lecture. Once each group of learners has determined a method of solving the problem, they provide their response via the ARS. Afterwards, the instructor displays all group responses and facilitates a class discussion in which each group elaborates upon and defends their method to the other groups.
