= Basic Support for Cooperative Work =

Collaborative workspace software

BSCW
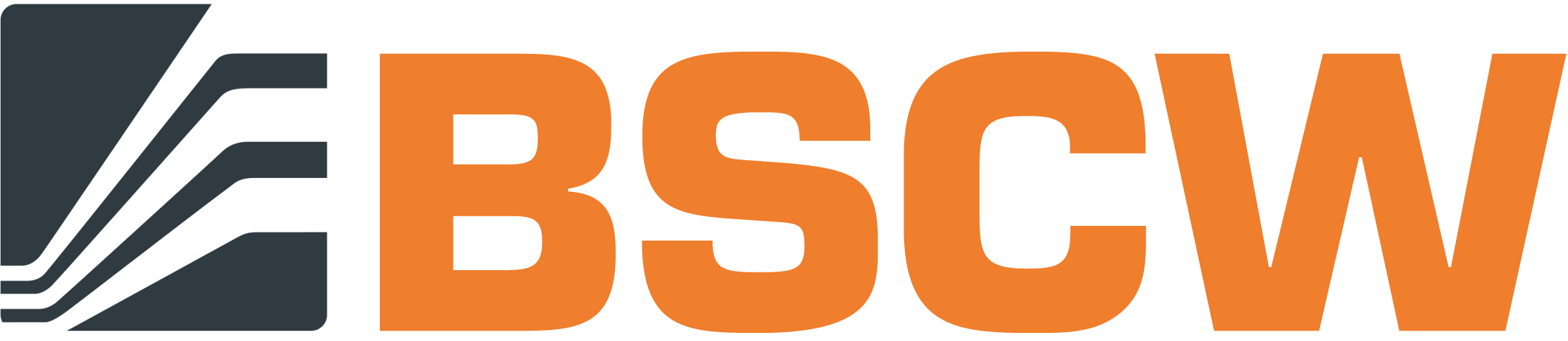
- Original author: Fraunhofer Institute for Applied Information Technology FIT
- Developers: OrbiTeam Software GmbH & Co. KG
- Release: 1995
- Stable release: BSCW Classic 5.2.2 BSCW Social 7.3
- Written in: Python
- Type: Groupware
- Website: https://www.bscw.de/en/

Basic Support for Cooperative Work (BSCW) is a collaborative workspace software package for collaboration over the Web, developed by the Fraunhofer Society. BSCW supports document upload, event notification, and group management. The last version are BSCW Classic (5) and BSCW Social (7). Clients require a standard web browser only.

The products are mainly aimed at companies, as well as educational institutions and governmental organizations, but can also be used for private corporation. BSCW can entirely be used in the browser. The groupware is offered as Cloud or OnPremise. The software license is based on the number of users.

== Products ==
Currently, there are two product versions of BSCW. The BSCW Classic continues the software since its first release and offers basic collaboration tools. The BSCW Social was developed in parallel, has a more modern design and focuses more on communication and document exchange, as well as contextual and interactive collaboration.

== Functions ==
The BSCW versions offer more than 500 features to simplify internal collaboration. They offer communication tools such as chat, messages or comments with audio- and video conferences, as well as options for scheduling appointments and tasks in the form of calendar entries or task areas. Documents on the local computer can be automatically synchronised with BSCW. In addition, workspaces for documents and workgroups can be created in which documents can be edited and exchanged by multiple users.

== Company ==
OrbiTeam Software was founded in 1998 as a spin-off for the development and distribution of BSCW and continues to provide maintenance, development and professional support for BSCW systems worldwide. OrbiTeam's services include support during installation and operation, as well as customisation and extension of BSCW systems.

BSCW is used by over one million registered users worldwide. Customers include large European telecommunications companies, federal and state authorities, research institutes, universities and numerous small and medium-sized companies.

In 2021, the ITZ-Bund, the IT department of the German Government recorded an increase in the user base in the federal ministries to over 100 thousand in the course of the corona pandemic.

The company has its headquarter in Bonn, Germany.

== Research ==
The Fraunhofer FIT is a major research partner. Various national and international research projects have been conducted with BSCW. These include MILK (Multimedia Interaction for Learning and Knowing), CoEUD and EnArgus.

== History ==
BSCW was introduced in 1995 by the German Society for Mathematics and Data Processing (GMD) (now Fraunhofer Institute for Applied Information Technology (FIT)). In 1998 the company OrbiTeam Software GmbH & Co. KG was founded as a spin-off of the Fraunhofer Institute to further develop and distribute the software.

BSCW was expanded into a comprehensive collaboration tool in 2017 with version 7.0. Since then, BSCW has supported video calls, short messages, and project and task management in addition to document management. Since version 7.6, LLMs have been integrated in the form of virtual colleagues.

The Python programming language was used right from the start. JavaScript, HTML and CSS followed.

== See also ==
- Open-Xchange
