= Marlene Scardamalia =

Canadian education researcher

Marlene Scardamalia is an education researcher, professor at the Ontario Institute for Studies in Education, University of Toronto.

== Contributions ==
She is considered one of the pioneers in computer-supported collaborative learning. Other areas of research where Scardamalia made contributions are:

- Cognitive development
- Educational uses of computers
- Intentional learning
- The nature of expertise
- Psychology of writing
- Research-based innovation in learning and knowledge work
- Knowledge innovation.

Since the 1980s she supervised the design, development and research of Computer Supported Intentional Learning Environments (CSILE). The new version of CSILE was renamed Knowledge Forum and has been used in educational technology since 1996. Knowledge Forum was designed to offer technical support for Knowledge building theory. It is designed to help knowledge building communities. From 1996 to 2002, she was the K-12 theme leader for Canada's TeleLearning Network of Centres of Excellence. She is also one of the founders and main researchers of the Institute for Knowledge Innovation and Technology (IKIT).

== Books by Scardamalia ==
- Scardamalia, M., Bereiter, C. Fillion, B. (1981). Writing for Results: A Sourcebook of Consequential Composing Activities; Curriculum Series; Ontario Institute for Studies in Education(44).
- Bereiter, C. and Scardamalia, M. (1987) The Psychology of Written Composition. Lawrence Erlbaum Associates
- Bereiter, C. and Scardamalia, M. (1989). Across the World: Reading Skills Workbook Level 3:2.
- Bereiter, C. and Scardamalia, M. (1993). Surpassing Ourselves: An Inquiry into the Nature and Implications of Expertise.
- Anderson, V., Brown, A., Scardamalia, M., Campione, J. and Bereiter, C. (1995). Continuous assessment (collections for young scholars, masters/grade 3.
- Anderson, V., Brown, A., Scardamalia, M., Campione, J. and Bereiter, C. (1995). Essay and writing assessment (collections for Young scholars, masters/grade 3).
- Bereiter, C., Anderson, A., Brown, A., and Scardamalia, M. (1995). Reproducible Masters - Support for Teacher Tool Cards.
- Koschmann, T., Scardamalia, M., Zimmerman, B.J., and Bereiter, C. (2000). Problem-based Learning: A Research Perspective on Learning Interactions.

== Awards ==
- In 2008, she became the recipient of the José Vasconcelos World Award of Education for her remarkable contributions in the field of social education, revolutionizing schooling by engaging students more directly and productively in creative work based on knowledge and ideas.

== See also ==
- Carl Bereiter
- Knowledge building
- Knowledge Forum
- IKIT
- OISE
- University of Toronto
