= Aalto Media Lab =

Research laboratory of Aalto University

Coordinates: 60°11′08.5″N 24°49′29.5″E

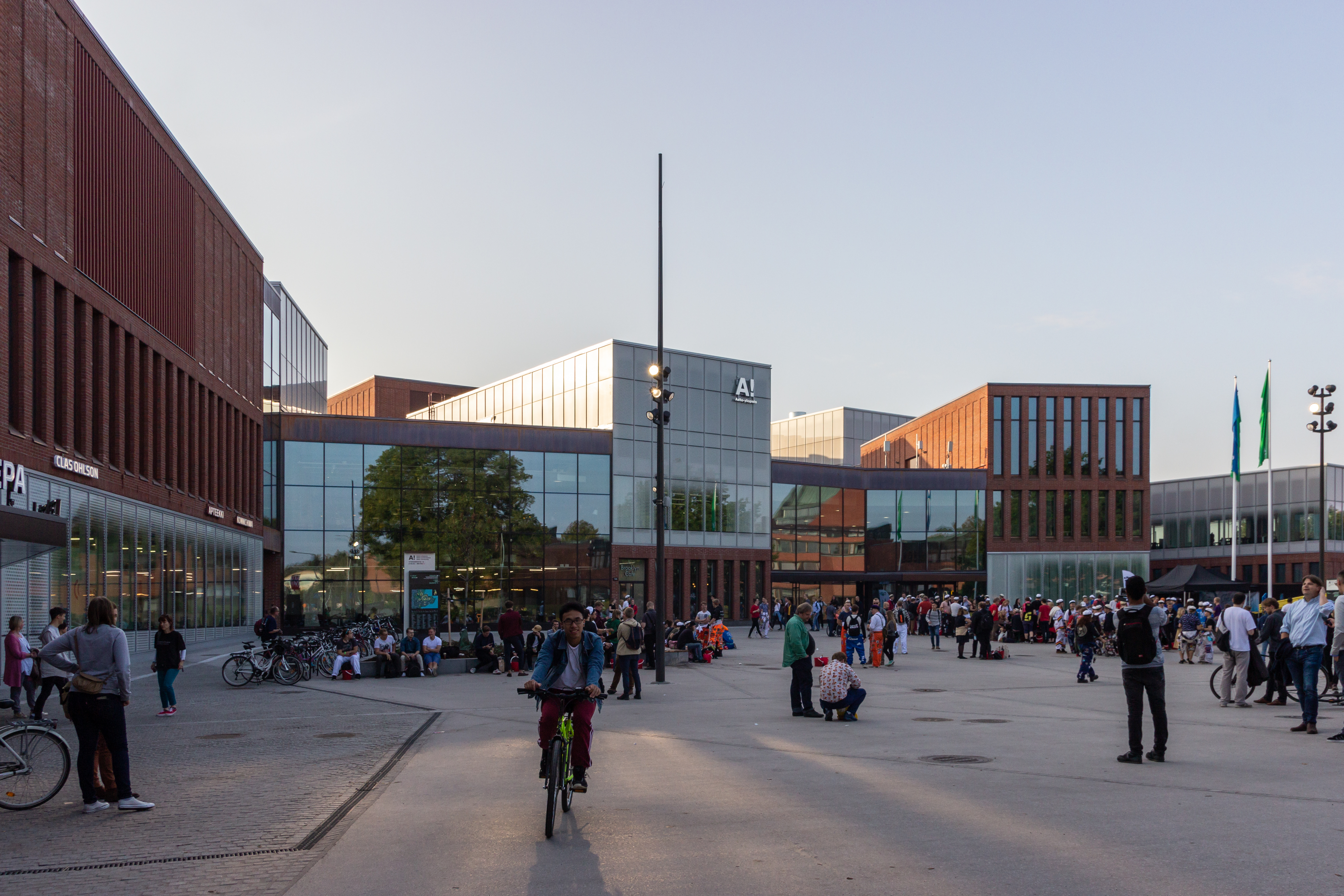
Aalto Media Lab is located in the Väre-building, next to the University plaza and the Aalto University -metro station.

Aalto Media Lab is a transdisciplinary laboratory focusing on digital art and design and its impact to culture and society. The Lab is part of the Department of Art and Media at the School of Arts, Design and Architecture, Aalto University in Finland.

Media Lab is a base for MA and Doctoral studies, and for research on design and production of digital culture, digital media, interaction design, games, new media art and sound and the effect they have on society.

The current MA programs and majors of the Aalto Media Lab are MA in New Media, Sound in New Media and Game Design. The Lab is a coordinator and a partner in number of international research, design and development projects focusing on digital technology, art, design, media and culture.

In conjunction with the Media Lab's Demo Day, held since 1995, in 2025 Media Lab celebrated its 30th anniversary with an exhibition featuring both brand new works and old classics from over the years.

== History ==
Media Lab was founded in 1993. The first MA program was started in 1994 and the first research group assembled in 1996. The roots of the Media Lab are in the early Scandinavian media art, demoscene, game design, hacker culture, and participatory design communities. Since its formation the Media Lab has been part of a relatively active digital culture scene in Helsinki and its surroundings.

Since 1995 Media Lab has collaborated in, generated and coordinated research and development projects funded by the European Commission, Tekes (the Finnish Funding Agency for Technology and Innovation), Nordic Council, UNESCO and a number of industrial partners, including Nokia, Elisa, TeliaSonera, Sanoma, YLE and MTV3.

In 1998 the lab became an official department at the university. In January 2000 the Media Centre Lume, the National Research and Development Center of audiovisual media was officially opened. Lume was located in the same premises as the Media Lab and offered its resources for study and research projects carried out in the Lab. The Lume was closed in 2016 as part of the new Aalto University's reorganisation.

In 2001, the Ministry of Education Finland chose Media Lab as one of the national top educational units.

In 2006 Media Lab was invited to the Ars Electronica. The Beta Lounge, Campus Exhibition presented over 20 works by Media Lab's MA, DA and alumni students and its four research groups of that time. Since then Media Lab researchers, designers and artist have collaborated in with the Ars Electronica Center in various projects.

2008 saw the beginnings of Aalto University, a new university. Aalto is the fusion of the University of Art and Design Helsinki where Media Lab was located, with Helsinki School of Economics and Helsinki University of Technology.

In 2010, as part of Aalto reorganisation, the Media Lab joined forces with Photography and Graphic Design, formerly of the Visual Culture department, to create the Department of Media.

In 2015 the Media Lab moved to a temporary space at the Aalto Campus in Otaniemi. In autumn 2018 the Lab moved to a new Väre-building designed and built for the School of Arts, Design and Architecture.

== Teaching ==
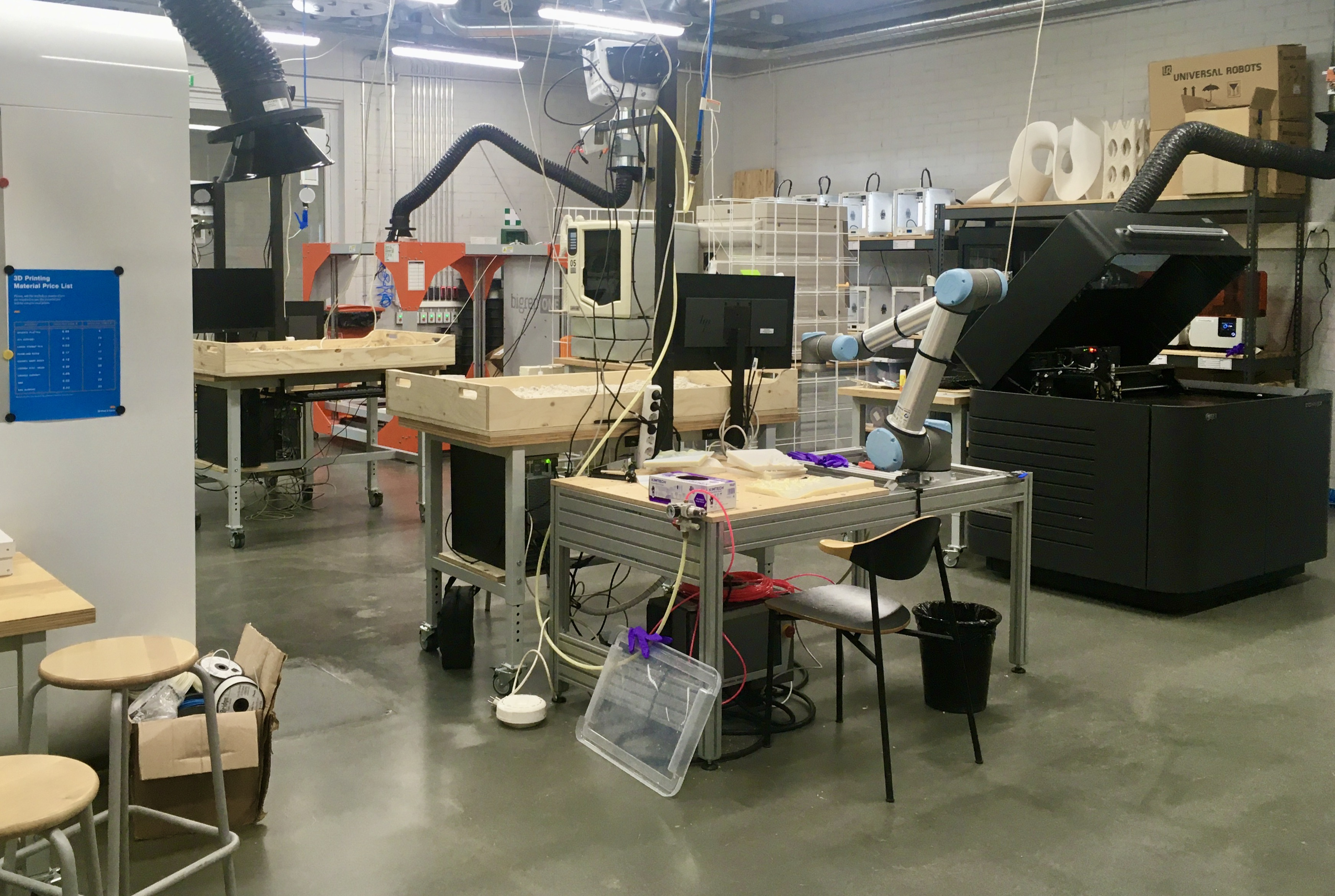
One of the workshops in the Aalto ARTS.

Media Lab provides platform for Master of Arts and Doctor of Arts (equivalent to PhD) studies in three areas: New Media Design and Production, Sound in New Media and Game Design and Production. The doctoral students often work within the thematic research groups. Teaching is in English and about 40% of students are non-Finns.

The workshops of the School of Arts, Design and Architecture are in the downstairs of the Lab providing tools for building physical, digital and interactive prototypes. In the workshops students and researchers can use various kind of tools, from computer controlled looms and sewing machines to woodworking machines, 3D printers, water jet and laser cutting and milling machines. There are also studios for ceramics, photography and mechatronics.

== Research ==
As a transdisciplinary laboratory, Aalto Media Lab is open for experiments in all areas and aspects of new media and digital design. The MA and doctoral studies can do independent research within the facilities and the community. Within the Lab there are three research groups.

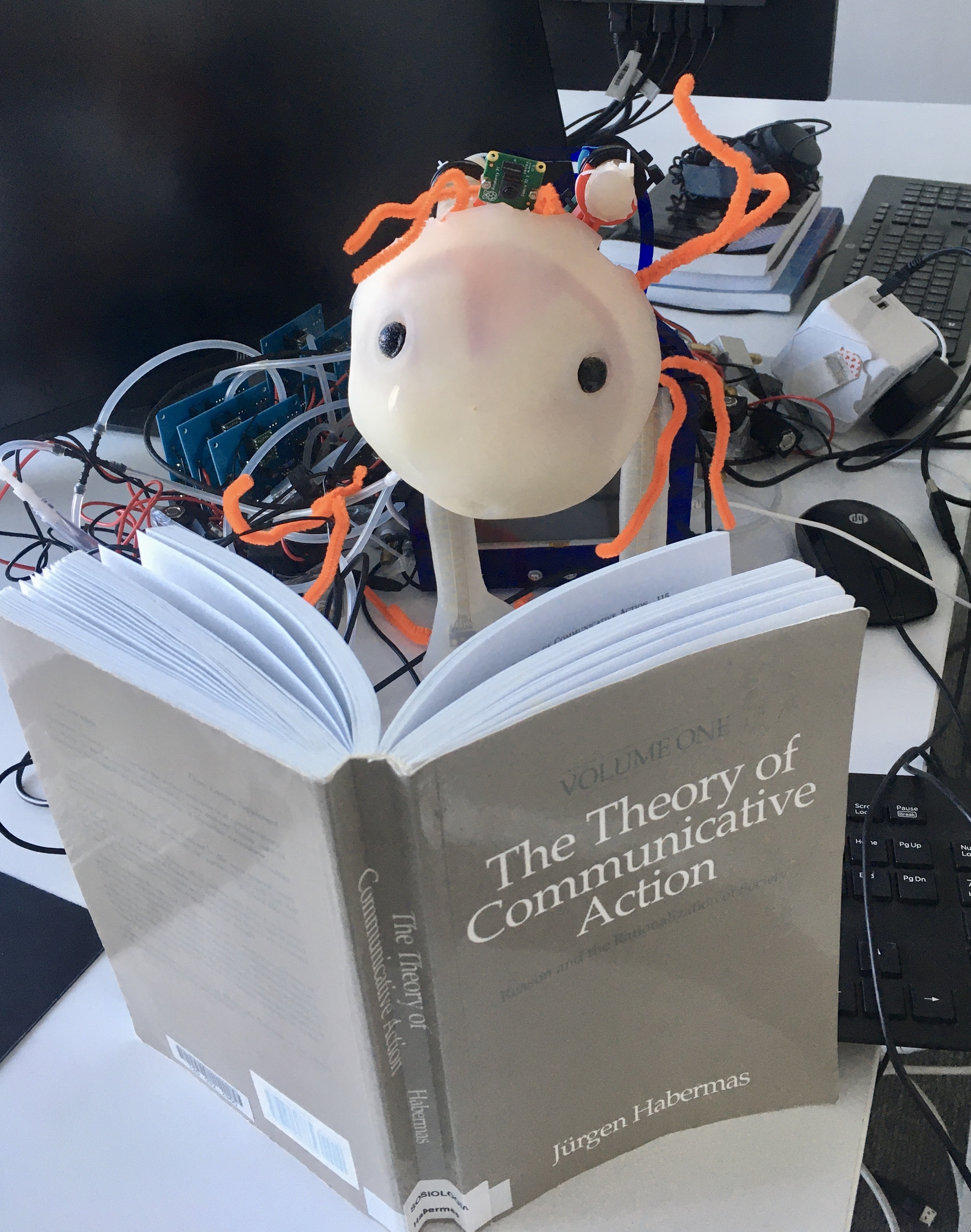
Hitodama, soft telerobot, designed in the Aalto Media Lab by Avner Peled. Reading (or used for reading remotely) Jürgen Habermas.

The Learning Environments research group (LeGroup) is involved in research, design and development of New Media tools, as well as their use and application, in the field of learning. Besides academic research papers the outcomes of the group are often software systems, software prototypes, applications and scenarios. The group's works are based on the social constructivist theory that sees learning as a participation in social processes of knowledge construction.

The Systems of Representation group conducts research into representation, culture, and knowledge in the digital dimension. The group works on research and design projects, educational activities, and publishes frequently on topics such as cultural heritage, design research, new media, synthetic reality and simulation.

Sound and Physical Interaction (SOPI), a relatively new research group focusses on sound and its emerging role in designing new ways of interactions between humans through digital environments. The group's mission is to investigate and integrate innovative research activities in sound design and physical interaction practices on various levels to advance their roles and impact in the future of media and interactive art.

In the thematic research groups, researchers and doctoral students often do art and design experiments related to interaction design, video game design, sonic interaction design, information visualization, digital visual art and sonic art.

== Notable projects ==
- Invited Campus Exhibition at the Ars Electronica 2006 festival in Linz.
- Fle3 - Future Learning Environment, open source virtual learning environment.
- Accidental Lovers, an interactive musical comedy for Television.
- Soundscape of the New Children's Hospital in Helsinki.

== See also ==
- Aalto University
