= Knowledge building =

Learning theory

The Knowledge Building (KB) theory was created and developed by Carl Bereiter and Marlene Scardamalia for describing what a community of learners needs to accomplish in order to create knowledge. The theory addresses the need to educate people for the knowledge age society, in which knowledge and innovation are pervasive.

Knowledge building may be defined simply as "the creation, testing, and improvement of conceptual artifacts. It is not confined to education but applies to creative knowledge work of all kinds".

== Overview ==
Scardamalia & Bereiter distinguish between knowledge building and learning. They see learning as an internal, (almost) unobservable process that results in changes of beliefs, attitudes, or skills. By contrast, KB is seen as creating or modifying public knowledge. KB produces knowledge that lives 'in the world', and is available to be worked on and used by other people.

A good way to understand the difference between learning and knowledge building is by considering mathematics and scientific contents as examples of public knowledge. Furthermore, Bereiter in his book on Education and Mind (2002) based his observation of the educational value of KB on Karl Popper's ontological analysis of our existence as made up of three interacting worlds: World 1 (the physical), World 2 (the subjective) and World 3 (the locus of cultural products). Thus, learning takes place in World 2, while knowledge is built in World 3.

Knowledge building refers to the process of creating new cognitive artifacts as a result of common goals, group discussions, and synthesis of ideas. These pursuits should advance the current understanding of individuals within a group, at a level beyond their initial knowledge level, and should be directed towards advancing the understanding of what is known about that topic or idea. The theory "encompasses the foundational learning, subskills, and socio-cognitive dynamics pursued in other approaches, along with the additional benefit of movement along the trajectory to mature education".

Knowledge building can be considered as deep constructivism that involves making a collective inquiry into a specific topic, and coming to a deeper understanding through interactive questioning, dialogue, and continuing improvement of ideas. Ideas are thus the medium of operation in KB environments. The teacher becomes a guide, rather than a director, and allows students to take over a significant portion of the responsibility for their own learning, including planning, execution, and evaluation.

One of the hallmarks of KB is a sense of we superseding the sense of I, a feeling that the group is operating collectively, and not just as an assemblage of individuals. Discussion software can enable such an environment, one being Knowledge Forum, which supports many of the prerequisite processes of KB. Bereiter and colleagues state that Knowledge building projects focus on understanding rather than on accomplishing tasks, and on collaboration rather than on controversy.

Setting children on a KB trajectory is a promising foundation for education in the knowledge age.

== Principles of Knowledge building ==
Scardamalia (2002) identifies twelve principles of KB as follows:

· Real ideas and genuine real problems. In the classroom students should concerned about understanding the real-world problems.

· Ideas Improvable. Students' ideas are regarded as improvable objects

· A variety of ideas. In the classroom, a variety of ideas raised by students is necessary.

· Rise above. Through continuous improvement in ideas and understanding, students create high-level concepts.

· Epistemic agency. Students themselves find their way to advance.

· Community knowledge, collective responsibility. The contribution of students in improving their collective knowledge in the classroom is the primary goal of the Knowledge building class.

· The democratization of knowledge. All people are invited to contribute to the advancement of knowledge in the classroom.

· Symmetric advancement of knowledge. The goal for Knowledge building communities is to have people and organizations working actively to ensure the mutual progress of their knowledge.

· The pervasive building of knowledge. Students contribute to the collective building of knowledge.

· Constructive use of authoritative sources. All participants, including teachers, stand the call as a natural approach to support their understanding.

· The conversation of building knowledge. Students are engaged in conversation to share and improve the advancement of knowledge in the classroom.

· Parallel, enabled, and transformable evaluation. Students gain a global view of their understanding, then decide how to approach their grades. They create and participate in evaluations in a variety of ways

== See also ==
- Educational psychology
- Progressive Inquiry
- Knowledge environment
- Knowledge Forum
- Fle3 - Future Learning Environment
- Knowledge building communities
- Constructionist learning
- Postmodernism
- Body-mind problem
