= Carl Bereiter =

US-born Canadian scholar

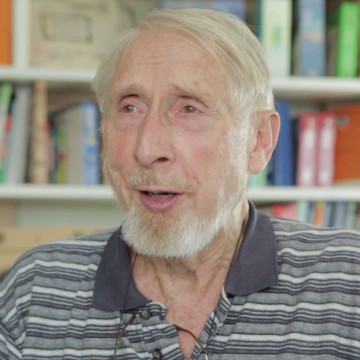
- Born: 1930 (age 95–96); Wisconsin, U.S.
- Education: Wisconsin University
- Known for: Research in knowledge building
- Title: Education Researcher

Carl Edward Bereiter (born 1930) is an American education researcher, professor emeritus at the Ontario Institute for Studies in Education, University of Toronto known for his research into knowledge building.

== Biography ==
He was born and raised in Wisconsin and entered Wisconsin University, where he was awarded B.A. in 1951, M.A. in 1952 and a Ph.D in 1959.

In 1961 he was appointed Assistant Professor at the University of Illinois, before moving his current position as Professor at the Ontario Institute for Studies in Education. Since 1996 he is also held the position of Co-Director, Programs and Research, Education Commons.

He was awarded a Guggenheim Fellowship in 1967.

== Contributions ==
His areas of research are:

- Knowledge building
- Knowledge age
- Knowledge workers
- Research design
- Intentional learning
- Instruction
- Cognitive psychology
- Educational policy
- Educational technology.

Carl Bereiter is one of the pioneers of Computer supported collaborative learning (CSCL). In collaboration with Marlene Scardamalia, he introduced and developed the theory of "knowledge building". He is one of the main researchers of Computer Supported Intentional Learning Environments (CSILE), the first networked system for collaborative learning. The second generation of product was renamed Knowledge Forum.

Bereiter is one of the founders and leading researchers of the Institute for Knowledge Innovation and Technology, (IKIT). His educational contributions, along with those of Ludwig Wittgenstein, Martin Heidegger, Jean Piaget, Lev Vygotsky, Michel Foucault, Howard Gardner, and others, are profiled in Fifty Modern Thinkers on Education.

He became well known for a 1966 proposal cowritten with Siegfried Engelmann on the persistent gap between inner city and middle class children in educational achievement that appeared in Teaching Disadvantaged Children in the Preschool. This position came to be called the cultural deficit hypothesis. This provoked a response by William Labov encapsulated in a much reprinted paper called "The logic of non-standard English." that argued that cultural and linguistic difference rather than deficit lay behind much of the gap. Bereiter has claimed that he was misread by his critics.

== Books by Bereiter ==
- Scardamalia, M., Bereiter, C. Fillion, B. (1981). Writing for Results: A Sourcebook of Consequential Composing Activities; Curriculum Series; Ontario Institute for Studies in Education (44).
- Bereiter, C., & Scardamalia, M. (1987). The psychology of written composition. Hillsdale, NJ: Lawrence Erlbaum Associates.
- Bereiter, C. and Scardamalia, M. (1989). Across the World: Reading Skills Workbook Level 3:2.
- Bereiter, C. and Scardamalia, M (1993). Surpassing Ourselves: An Inquiry into the Nature and Implications of Expertise.
- Anderson, V., Brown, A. Scardamalia, A., Campione, J. and Bereiter, C. (1995). Continuous assessment (collections for young scholars, masters/grade 3)
- Bereiter, C., Anderson, A., Brown, A., and Scardamalia, M. (1995). Reproducible Masters - Support for Teacher Tool Cards.
- Anderson, V., Brown, A., Scardamalia, M., Campione, J., and Bereiter, C. (1995). Essay and writing assessment (collections for young scholars, masters/grade 3).
- Bereiter, C. (1997). Collections for Young Scholars: Volume 3, Book 1.
- Bereiter, C. (1997). Spelling and Vocabulary Skills Annotated Teacher's Edition Grade 5 (SRA Open Court Reading).
- Bereiter, C., Jager, M., Pressley, A. and Pressley, M. (2000). SRA Open Court Reading: Reading and Writing Workbook, Level 4, Teacher's edition.
- Koschmann, T., Scardamalia, M., Zimmerman, B.J., and Bereiter, C. (2000). Problem-based Learning: A Research Perspective on Learning Interactions.
- Bereiter, C. (2002). Education and Mind in the Knowledge Age.
- Bereiter, C. (2002). Open Court Reading Level 2 Book 2.
- Smith, B. and Bereiter, C. (2002). Liberal Education in a Knowledge Society.
- Bereiter, C., Kaplan, S.N. and Pressley, M. (2003). Open Court Classics: Level 3.
- Bereiter, C., Adams, J., Pressley, M. and Roit, M. (2004). Open Court Reading: Level 4.
- Bereiter, C., Carl (1970) Willy the Wisher and Other Thinking Stories. Open Court Publishing

== See also ==
- Knowledge building
- Knowledge Forum
- OISE
- University of Toronto
- Marlene Scardamalia
