= Computer-supported collaborative learning =

Pedagogical approach

Computer-supported collaborative learning (CSCL) is a pedagogical approach wherein learning takes place via social interaction using a computer or through the Internet. This kind of learning is characterized by the sharing and construction of knowledge among participants using technology as their primary means of communication or as a common resource. CSCL can be implemented in online and classroom learning environments and can take place synchronously or asynchronously.

The study of computer-supported collaborative learning draws on a number of academic disciplines, including instructional technology, educational psychology, sociology, cognitive psychology, and social psychology. It is related to collaborative learning and Computer Supported Cooperative Work.

== History ==
Interactive computing technology was primarily conceived by academics, but the use of technology in education has historically been defined by contemporary research trends. The earliest instances of software in instruction drilled students using the behaviorist method that was popular throughout the mid-twentieth century. In the 1970s as cognitivism gained traction with educators, designers began to envision learning technology that employed artificial intelligence models that could adapt to individual learners. Computer-supported collaborative learning emerged as a strategy rich with research implications for the growing philosophies of constructivism and social cognitivism.

Though studies in collaborative learning and technology took place throughout the 1980s and 90s, the earliest public workshop directly addressing CSCL was "Joint Problem Solving and Microcomputers" which took place in San Diego in 1983. Six years later in 1989, the term "computer-supported collaborative learning" was used in a NATO-sponsored workshop in Maratea, Italy. A biannual CSCL conference series began in 1995. At the 2002 and 2003 CSCL conferences, the International Society of the Learning Sciences (ISLS) was established to run the CSCL and ICLS conference series and the International Journal of Computer-Supported Collaborative Learning (ijCSCL) and JLS journals.

The ijCSCL was established by the CSCL research community and ISLS. It began quarterly publication by Springer in 2006. It is peer reviewed and published both online and in print. Since 2009, it has been rated by ISI as being in the top 10% of educational research journals based on its impact factor.

The rapid development of social media technologies and the increasing need of individuals to understand and use those technologies has brought researchers from many disciplines to the field of CSCL. CSCL is used today in traditional and online schools and knowledge-building communities such as Wikipedia.

== Theories ==
The field of CSCL draws heavily from a number of learning theories that emphasize that knowledge is the result of learners interacting with each other, sharing knowledge, and building knowledge as a group. Since the field focuses on collaborative activity and collaborative learning, it inherently takes much from constructivist and social cognitivist learning theories.

=== Precursor theories ===
The roots of collaborative epistemology as related to CSCL can be found in Vygotsky's social learning theory. Of particular importance to CSCL is the theory's notion of internalization, or the idea that knowledge is developed by one's interaction with one's surrounding culture and society. The second key element is what Vygotsky called the Zone of proximal development. This refers to a range of tasks that can be too difficult for a learner to master by themselves but is made possible with the assistance of a more skilled individual or teacher. These ideas feed into a notion central to CSCL: knowledge building is achieved through interaction with others.

Cooperative learning, though different in some ways from collaborative learning, also contributes to the success of teams in CSCL environments. The distinction can be stated as: cooperative learning focuses on the effects of group interaction on individual learning whereas collaborative learning is more concerned with the cognitive processes at the group unit of analysis such as shared meaning making and the joint problem space. The five elements for effective cooperative groups identified by the work of Johnson and Johnson are positive interdependence, individual accountability, promotive interaction, social skills, and group processing. Because of the inherent relationship between cooperation and collaboration, understanding what encourages successful cooperation is essential to CSCL research.

In the late 1980s and early 1990s, Marlene Scardamalia and Carl Bereiter wrote seminal articles leading to the development of key CSCL concepts: knowledge-building communities and knowledge-building discourse, intentional learning, and expert processes. Their work led to an early collaboration-enabling technology known as the Computer Supported Intentional Learning Environment (CSILE). Characteristically for CSCL, their theories were integrated with the design, deployment, and study of the CSCL technology. CSILE later became Knowledge Forum, which is the most widely used CSCL technology worldwide to date.

Other learning theories that provide a foundation for CSCL include distributed cognition, problem-based learning, group cognition, cognitive apprenticeship, and situated learning. Each of these learning theories focuses on the social aspect of learning and knowledge building, and recognizes that learning and knowledge building involve inter-personal activities including conversation, argument, and negotiation.

=== Collaboration theory and group cognition ===
Only in the last 15 to 20 years have researchers begun to explore the extent to which computer technology could enhance the collaborative learning process. While researchers, in general, have relied on learning theories developed without consideration of computer-support, some have suggested that the field needs to have a theory tailored and refined for the unique challenges that confront those trying to understand the complex interplay of technology and collaborative learning.

Collaboration theory, suggested as a system of analysis for CSCL by Gerry Stahl in 2002–2006, postulates that knowledge is constructed in social interactions such as discourse. The theory suggests that learning is not a matter of accepting fixed facts, but is the dynamic, on-going, and evolving result of complex interactions primarily taking place within communities of people. It also emphasizes that collaborative learning is a process of constructing meaning and that meaning creation most often takes place and can be observed at the group unit of analysis. The goal of collaboration theory is to develop an understanding of how meaning is collaboratively constructed, preserved, and re-learned through the media of language and artifacts in group interaction. There are four crucial themes in collaboration theory: collaborative knowledge building (which is seen as a more concrete term than "learning"); group and personal perspectives intertwining to create group understanding; mediation by artifacts (or the use of resources which learners can share or imprint meaning on); and interaction analysis using captured examples that can be analyzed as proof that the knowledge building occurred.

Collaboration theory proposes that technology in support of CSCL should provide new types of media that foster the building of collaborative knowing; facilitate the comparison of knowledge built by different types and sizes of groups; and help collaborative groups with the act of negotiating the knowledge they are building. Further, these technologies and designs should strive to remove the teacher as the bottleneck in the communication process to the facilitator of student collaboration. In other words, the teacher should not have to act as the conduit for communication between students or as the avenue by which information is dispensed, but should structure the problem-solving tasks. Finally, collaboration theory-influenced technologies will strive to increase the quantity and quality of learning moments via computer-simulated situations.

Stahl extended his proposals about collaboration theory during the next decade with his research on group cognition . In his book on "Group Cognition", he provided a number of case studies of prototypes of collaboration technology, as well as a sample in-depth interaction analysis and several essays on theoretical issues related to re-conceptualizing cognition at the small-group unit of analysis. He then launched the Virtual Math Teams project at the Math Forum, which conducted more than 10 years of studies of students exploring mathematical topics collaboratively online. "Studying VMT" documented many issues of design, analysis and theory related to this project. The VMT later focused on supporting dynamic geometry by integrating a multi-user version of GeoGebra. All aspects of this phase of the VMT project were described in "Translating Euclid." Then, "Constructing Dynamic Triangles Together" provided a detailed analysis of how a group of four girls learned about dynamic geometry by enacting a series of group practices during an eight-session longitudinal case study. Finally, "Theoretical Investigations: Philosophical Foundations of Group Cognition" collected important articles on the theory of collaborative learning from the CSCL journal and from Stahl's publications. The VMT project generated and analyzed data at the small-group unit of analysis, to substantiate and refine the theory of group cognition and to offer a model of design-based CSCL research.

== Strategies ==
Currently, CSCL is used in instructional plans in classrooms both traditional and online from primary school to post-graduate institutions. Like any other instructional activity, it has its own prescribed practices and strategies which educators are encouraged to employ in order to use it effectively. Because its use is so widespread, there are innumerable scenarios in the use of CSCL, but there are several common strategies that provide a foundation for group cognition.

One of the most common approaches to CSCL is collaborative writing. Though the final product can be anything from a research paper, a Wikipedia entry, or a short story, the process of planning and writing together encourages students to express their ideas and develop a group understanding of the subject matter. Tools like blogs, interactive whiteboards, and custom spaces that combine free writing with communication tools can be used to share work, form ideas, and write synchronously.

Technology-mediated discourse refers to debates, discussions, and other social learning techniques involving the examination of a theme using technology. For example, wikis are a way to encourage discussion among learners, but other common tools include mind maps, survey systems, and simple message boards. Like collaborative writing, technology-mediated discourse allows participants that may be separated by time and distance to engage in conversations and build knowledge together.

Group exploration refers to the shared discovery of a place, activity, environment or topic among two or more people. Students do their exploring in an online environment, use technology to better understand a physical area, or reflect on their experiences together through the Internet. Virtual worlds like Second Life and Whyville as well as synchronous communication tools like Skype may be used for this kind of learning. Educators may use Orchestration Graphs to define activities and roles that students must adopt during learning, and analyzing afterwards the learning process.

Problem-based learning is a popular instructional activity that lends itself well to CSCL because of the social implications of problem solving. Complex problems call for rich group interplay that encourages collaboration and creates movement toward a clear goal.

Project-based learning is similar to problem-based learning in that it creates impetus to establish team roles and set goals. The need for collaboration is also essential for any project and encourages team members to build experience and knowledge together. Although there are many advantages to using software that has been specifically developed to support collaborative learning or project-based learning in a particular domain, any file sharing or communication tools can be used to facilitate CSCL in problem- or project-based environments.

When Web 2.0 applications (wikies, blogs, RSS feed, collaborative writing, video sharing, social networks, etc.) are used for computer-supported collaborative learning specific strategies should be used for their implementation, especially regarding (1) adoption by teachers and students; (2) usability and quality in use issues; (3) technology maintenance; (4) pedagogy and instructional design; (5) social interaction between students; (6) privacy issues; and (7) information/system security.

== Teacher roles ==
Though the focus in CSCL is on individuals collaborating with their peers, teachers still have a vital role in facilitating learning. Most obviously, the instructor must introduce the CSCL activity in a thoughtful way that contributes to an overarching design plan for the course. The design should clearly define the learning outcomes and assessments for the activity. In order to assure that learners are aware of these objectives and that they are eventually met, proper administration of both resources and expectations is necessary to avoid learner overload. Once the activity has begun, the teacher is charged with kick-starting and monitoring discussion to facilitate learning. He or she must also be able to mitigate technical issues for the class. Lastly, the instructor must engage in assessment, in whatever form the design calls for, in order to ensure objectives have been met for all students.

Without the proper structure, any CSCL strategy can lose its effectiveness. It is the responsibility of the teacher to make students aware of what their goals are, how they should be interacting, potential technological concerns, and the time-frame for the exercise. This framework should enhance the experience for learners by supporting collaboration and creating opportunities for the construction of knowledge. Another important consideration of educators who implement online learning environments is affordance. Students who are already comfortable with online communication often choose to interact casually. Mediators should pay special attention to make students aware of their expectations for formality online. While students sometime have frames of reference for online communication, they often do not have all of the skills necessary to solve problems by themselves. Ideally, teachers provide what is called "scaffolding", a platform of knowledge that they can build on. A unique benefit of CSCL is that, given proper teacher facilitation, students can use technology to build learning foundations with their peers. This allows instructors to gauge the difficulty of the tasks presented and make informed decisions about the extent of the scaffolding needed.

== Effects ==
According to Salomon (1995), the possibility of intellectual partnerships with both peers and advanced information technology has changed the criteria for what is counted to be the effects of technology. Instead of only concentrating on the amount and quality of learning outcomes, we need to distinguish between two kinds of effects: that is, "effects with a tool and/or collaborating peers, and effects of these." He used the term called "effects with" which is to describe the changes that take place while one is engaged in intellectual partnership with peers or with a computer tool. For example, the changed quality of problem solving in a team. And he means the word "effects of" more lasting changes that take place when computer-enhanced collaboration teaches students to ask more exact and explicit questions even when not using that system.

=== Applications ===
It has a number of implications for instructional designers, developers, and teachers.

- First, it revealed what technological features or functions were particularly important and useful to students in the context of writing, and how a CSCL system could be adapted for use for different subject areas, which have specific implications for instructional designers or developers to consider when designing CSCL tools.
- Second, this study also suggested the important role of a teacher in designing the scaffolds, scaffolding the collaborative learning process, and making CSCL a success. Third, it is important that a meaningful, real-world task is designed for CSCL in order to engage students in authentic learning activities of knowledge construction.
- Third, cooperative work in the classroom, using as a tool based technology devices "one to one " where the teacher has a program of classroom management, allows not only the enhancement of teamwork where each member takes responsibilities involving the group, but also a personalized and individualized instruction, adapting to the rhythms of the students, and allowing to achieve the targets set in which has been proposed for them individualized Work Plan.

== Criticism and concerns ==
Though CSCL holds promise for enhancing education, it is not without barriers or challenges to successful implementation. Obviously, students or participants need sufficient access to computer technology. Though access to computers has improved in the last 15 to 20 years, teacher attitudes about technology and sufficient access to Internet-connected computers continue to be barriers to more widespread usage of CSCL pedagogy.

Furthermore, instructors find that the time needed to monitor student discourse and review, comment on, and grade student products can be more demanding than what is necessary for traditional face-to-face classrooms. The teacher or professor also has an instructional decision to make regarding the complexity of the problem presented. To warrant collaborative work, the problem must be of sufficient complexity, otherwise teamwork is unnecessary. Also, there is risk in assuming that students instinctively know how to work collaboratively. Though the task may be collaborative by nature, students may still need training on how to work in a truly cooperative process.

Others have noted a concern with the concept of scripting as it pertains to CSCL. There is an issue with possibly over-scripting the CSCL experience and in so doing, creating "fake collaboration". Such over-scripted collaboration may fail to trigger the social, cognitive, and emotional mechanisms that are necessary to true collaborative learning.

There is also the concern that the mere availability of the technology tools can create problems. Instructors may be tempted to apply technology to a learning activity that can very adequately be handled without the intervention or support of computers. In the process of students and teachers learning how to use the "user-friendly" technology, they never get to the act of collaboration. As a result, computers become an obstacle to collaboration rather than a supporter of it.

== For second language acquisition ==
=== History ===
The advent of computer-supported collaborative learning (CSCL) as an instructional strategy for second language acquisition can be traced back to the 1990s. During that time, the internet was growing rapidly, which was one of the key factors that facilitated the process. At the time, the first wikis (such as WikiWikiWeb) were still undergoing early development, but the use of other tools such as electronic discussion groups allowed for equal participation amongst peers, particularly benefiting those who would normally not participate otherwise during face-to-face interactions.

During the establishment of wikis in the 2000s, global research began to emerge regarding their effectiveness in promoting second language acquisition. Some of this research focused on more specific areas such as systemic-functional linguistics, humanistic education, experiental learning, and psycholinguistics. For example, in 2009 Yu-Ching Chen performed a study to determine the overall effectiveness of wikis in an English as a second language class in Taiwan. Another example is a 2009 study by Greg Kessler in which pre-service, non-native English speaker teachers in a Mexican university were given the task to collaborate on a wiki, which served as the final product for one of their courses. In this study, emphasis was placed on the level of grammatical accuracy achieved by the students throughout the course of the task.

Due to the continual development of technology, other educational tools aside from wikis are being implemented and studied to determine their potential in scaffolding second language acquisition. According to Mark Warschauer (2010), among these are blogs, automated writing evaluation systems, and open-source netbooks. Ex situ of the classroom, the development of other recent online tools such as Livemocha (2007) have facilitated language acquisition via member-to-member interactions, demonstrating firsthand the impact the advancement of technology has made towards meeting the varying needs of language learners.

=== Effectiveness and perception ===
Studies in the field of computer-assisted language learning (CALL) have shown that computers provide material and valuable feedback for language learners and that computers can be a positive tool for both individual and collaborative language learning. CALL programs offer the potential for interactions between the language learners and the computer. Additionally, students' autonomous language learning and self-assessment can be made widely available through the web. In CSCL, the computer is not only seen as a potential language tutor by providing assessment for students' responses, but also as a tool to give language learners the opportunity to learn from the computer and also via collaboration with other language learners. Juan focuses on new models and systems that perform efficient evaluation of student activity in online-based education. Their findings indicate that CSCL environments organized by teachers are useful for students to develop their language skills. Additionally, CSCL increases students' confidence and encourages them to maintain active learning, reducing the passive reliance on teachers' feedback. Using CSCL as a tool in the second language learning classroom has also shown to reduce learner anxiety.

Various case studies and projects had been conducted in order to measure the effectiveness and perception of CSCL in a language learning classroom. After a collaborative internet-based project, language learners indicated that their confidence in using the language had increased and that they felt more motivated to learn and use the target language. After analyzing student questionnaires, discussion board entries, final project reports, and student journals, Dooly suggests that during computer supported collaborative language learning, students have an increased awareness of different aspects of the target language and pay increased attention to their own language learning process. Since the participants of her project were language teacher trainees, she adds that they felt prepared and willing to incorporate online interaction in their own teaching in the future.

=== Cultural considerations ===
Culture may be thought of as composed of "beliefs, norms, assumptions, knowledge, values, or sets of practice that are shared and form a system". Learning communities focused in whole or part on second language acquisition may often be distinctly multicultural in composition, and as the cultural background of individual learners affects their collaborative norms and practices, this can significantly impact their ability to learn in a CSCL environment.

CSCL environments are generally valued for the potential to promote collaboration in cross-cultural learning communities. Based on social constructivist views of learning, many CSCL environments fundamentally emphasize learning as the co-construction of knowledge through the computer-mediated interaction of multivoiced community members. Computer-mediation of the learning process has been found to afford consideration of alternative viewpoints in multicultural/multilingual learning communities. When compared to traditional face-to-face environments, computer-mediated learning environments have been shown to result in more equal levels of participation for ESL students in courses with native English speakers. Language barriers for non-native speakers tend to detract from equal participation in general, and this can be alleviated to some extent through the use of technologies which support asynchronous modes of written communication.

Online learning environments however tend to reflect the cultural, epistemological, and pedagogical goals and assumptions of their designers. In computer-supported collaborative learning environments, there is evidence that cultural background may impact learner motivation, attitude towards learning and e-learning, learning preference (style), computer usage, learning behavior and strategies, academic achievement, communication, participation, knowledge transfer, sharing and collaborative learning. Studies variously comparing Asian, American and Danish and Finnish learners have suggested that learners from different cultures exhibit different interaction patterns with their peers and teachers in online. A number of studies have shown that difference in Eastern and Western educational cultures, for instance, which are found in traditional environments are also present in online environments. Zhang has described Eastern education as more group-based, teacher-dominated, centrally organized, and examination-oriented than Western approaches. Students who have learned to learn in an Eastern context emphasizing teacher authority and standardized examinations may perform differently in a CSCL environment characterized by peer critique and co-construction of educational artifacts as the primary mode of assessment.

==== Design implications ====
A "multiple cultural model" of instructional design emphasizes variability and flexibility in the process of designing for multicultural inclusiveness, focusing on the development of learning environments reflecting the multicultural realities of society, include multiple ways of teaching and learning, and promote equity of outcomes. McLoughlin, C. & Oliver propose a social, constructivist approach to the design of culturally-sensitive CSCL environments which emphasizes flexibility with regard to specific learning tasks, tools, roles, responsibilities, communication strategies, social interactions, learning goals and modes of assessment [B5]. Constructivist instructional design approaches such as R2D2 which emphasize reflexive, recursive, participatory design of learning experiences may be employed in developing CSCL which authentically engages learners from diverse linguistic and cultural backgrounds.

== Dyslexia in Computer-Supported Collaborative Learning ==
=== History ===
Dyslexia primarily involves difficulties with reading, spelling and sentence structure, transposition, memory, organization and time management, and lack of confidence. Dyslexia has in the past two decades become increasingly present in research and legislation. The United Kingdom passed the Disability Discrimination Act 1995 in which institutions were required to "reasonably adjust" instruction for students with disabilities, particularly physical and sensory disabilities; in 2002, the Special Education Needs and Disabilities Act adjusted the legislation to include learning disabilities.

The Americans with Disabilities Act of 1990 (ADA) established that all students with disabilities must be included in all state and districtwide assessments of student progress. The ADA also guarantees equal accommodation for disabled people in, "employment, public accommodations, state and local government services, transportation, and telecommunications."

In recent years, tools such as WebHelpDyslexia and other capabilities of web applications have increased the availability of tools to provide coping skills for students with dyslexia.

=== Research on Dyslexia in E-Learning Environments ===
In 2006, Woodfine argued that dyslexia can impact the ability of a student to participate in synchronous e-learning environments, especially if activities being completed are text-based. During experimental qualitative research, Woodfine found that data suggested "learners with dyslexia might suffer from embarrassment, shame and even guilt about their ability to interact with other learners when in a synchronous environment."

In a study by Fichten et al., it was found that assistive technology can be beneficial in aiding students with the progression of their reading and writing skills. Tools such as spell check or text-to-speech can be helpful to learners with dyslexia by allowing them to focus more on self-expression and less on errors.

=== Design implications ===
Alsobhi, et al., examined assistive technologies for dyslexic students and concluded that the most fundamental considerations to be had when serving students of this population are: "the learning styles that people with dyslexia exhibit, and how assistive technology can be adapted to align with these learning behaviors."

The Dyslexia Adaptive E-Learning (DAEL) is a suggested a framework that proposes four dimensions that cover 26 attributes. The proposed framework asks educators to make decisions based on perceived ease of use, perceived usefulness, and system adaptability:

- perceived ease of use: This refers to the degree to which a student believes that using the technology is free of effort. One technique to increase the perceived ease of use includes utilizing technology in which self-descriptiveness is present. This, coupled with clarity and logical flow of functions, makes the learning process easier and the interaction between the user and machine more convenient.
- perceived usefulness: Defined as how a student's performance, or learning performance, can be enhanced by a system. Studies show the impact of perceived ease of use and perceived usefulness and their role in a users' decision on whether to use a system again. Scaffolding as well as accommodations to the student's learning style will help overcome limitations of system operations, as will feedback geared toward system improvements.
- system adaptability: Refers to the user experiences and the way in which students are given control over a system to increase confidence and comfort in their learning. In addition to implications for the system, the flow of content should be logical and the tone (attitude) of content should be encouraging.

=== 508 Compliance & the implications for Educators ===
Educators that choose to use the CSCL environment must be aware of 508 compliance and its legal implications. "In the U.S., the criteria for designing Web pages accessibly are provided by two major sets: the W3C's Web Accessibility Guidelines (WCAG) and the design standards issued under U.S. federal law, Section 508 of the Rehabilitation Act, as amended in 1998.1 Features of accessible design include, among others, the provision of ALT tags for nontextual elements, such as images, animations and image map hot spots; meaningful link text; logical and persistent page organization, and the inclusion of skip navigation links."

Unfortunately, not all educators are exposed to these guidelines, especially if their collegiate programs do not provide exposure to the use of computers, aspects of web design or technology in education. In some cases, it may be advantageous for the educator to collaborate with an instructional technologist or web designer to ensure 508 guidelines are addressed in the desired learning environment for the CSCL.

== Web 3.0 and Computer-Supported Collaborative Learning (CSCL) ==
The World Wide Web began as information sharing on static webpages accessible on a computer through the use of a web browser. As more interactive capabilities were added, it evolved into Web 2.0, which allowed for user-generated content and participation (e.g. social networking). This opened up many new possibilities for computer-supported collaborative learning (CSCL) using the Internet. The internet is now entering a new phase, Web 3.0 or the Semantic Web, which is characterized by the greater interconnectivity of machine-readable data from many different sources. New intelligent technology applications will be able to manage, organize and create meaning from this data, which will have a significant impact on CSCL.

The interconnectivity of machine-readable data with semantic tags means that searches will be greatly enhanced. Search results will be more relevant, recommendations of resources will be made based on search terms and results will include multimedia content.

New Web 3.0 capabilities for learners include enhanced tools for managing learning, allowing them to self-regulate and co-regulate learning without the assistance of an instructor. Through the use of Web 3.0, groups and communities can be formed according to specific criteria without human input. These communities and groups can provide support to new learners and give experts an opportunity to share their knowledge.

Teachers can benefit from these same capabilities to manage their teaching. In addition, the software for Web 3.0 collaboration will include using data from group communications, which then generates how much each individual has collaborated based on how often they communicate and how long their messages are.

=== Examples of new Web 3.0 tools to enhance CSCL ===
==== Virtual Assistants and Intelligent Agents ====
Making data machine-readable is leading to the development of virtual assistants and intelligent agents. These are tools which can access data on a user's behalf and will be able to assist learners and collaborators in several ways. They can provide personalized and customized search results by accessing data on a variety of platforms, recommend resources based on user information and preferences, manage administrative tasks, communicate with other agents and databases, and help organize information and interactions with collaborators.

==== Virtual Learning Communities ====
Virtual learning communities are cyberspaces that allow for individual and collaborative learning to take place. While they exist today, with Web 3.0 they will gain enhanced features enabling more collaborative learning to take place. Some describe them as evolving out of existing learning management systems (LMSs), adding intelligent agents and virtual assistants that can enhance content searches and deal with administrative and communication tasks, or enabling different LMSs around the world to communicate with each other, creating an even larger community to share resources and locate potential collaborators. Virtual learning communities will also enable different types of peer-to-peer interaction and resource sharing to support co-construction of knowledge. These communities may also include some aspects of 3D gaming and VR.

==== Non-immersive and Immersive 3D Virtual Environments ====
Through the use of 3D gaming, users can simulate lives of others while providing their knowledge throughout the 3D environment as an avatar. These 3D environments also foster simulation and scenario building for places where users would otherwise not have access. The 3D environments facilitate online knowledge building communities. Non-immersive environments are environments in which not all five senses are used but still allows users to interact in virtual worlds. Virtual Reality (VR) headsets are sometimes used to give users a full immersion experience, into these 3D virtual worlds. This allows users to interact with each other in real time and simulate different learning situations with other users. These learning experiences and environments vary between fields and learning goals. Certain virtual reality headsets allow users to communicate with each other while being in different physical locations.

== Multimodal literacy development in CSCL ==
=== The concept of Multimodal literacy ===
Multimodal literacy is the way processes of literacy - reading, writing, talking, listening and viewing - are occurring within and around new communication media. (Kress & Jewitt, 2003; Pahl & Rowsell, 2005; Walsh, 2008) It refers to meaning-making that occurs through the reading, viewing, understanding, responding to and producing and interacting with multimedia and digital texts. (Walsh, 2010)

=== Literature review on multi-modal literacy in CSCL ===
==== * Online forum ====
Online forums offer numerous advantages for both teacher and students for collaborative learning online. Discussion forums provide a wider platform to exchange information and ideas, to develop writing and reading skills, critical thinking skills. (Jill Margerison, 2013) A collaborative online forum can also help students learn about the unique challenges of online communication, especially the need for clarity and the dangers of sarcasm. (Susan Martens-Baker, 2009) For the teacher, they offer a flexible platform from which to educate in a participatory culture, where teachers and students can interact with each other and create new knowledge. (Jill Margerison, 2013)

==== * Video games ====
Video games were designed as a learning tool engaged learners who advance through experimentation, critical thinking and practice in the virtual world. (Abrams, 2009) Video games in CSCL can promote positive interdependence, individual accountability, face-to-face promotive interaction, social skills, and group processing abilities in the ELA classroom. Through interactions in the virtual world, learners have the opportunities to establish their presence, identity and create meanings for their lives.

==== * Multimodal composition in digital storytelling: podcast, video/ audio crafts ====
Digital storytelling refers to integrating a variety of means, such as images, audio, video, graphics and diagram to personal narratives and crafts. Four skill competencies: reading, writing, speaking, and listening would be enhanced by producing digital products. (Brenner, 2014) Students have a greater sense of autonomy, agency through the digital storytelling in CSCL.

=== The implication for classroom teaching ===
==== * Online-forum ====
Online forums provide opportunities for young people to engage in the self-exposition as they practice digital literacies and hone the skill of movement across multiple literacies, languages and subject positions. Meanwhile, identity is a constellation of the multiple communities. It is also important to emphasize the potentially harmful cultural discourses that occur within young people's consumption. (Kim, 2015)

==== * Videogame ====
Through capitalizing on students' gaming experiences by recognizing how they apply to the subject at hand, teachers can highlight the benefits of virtual learning environments and draw upon students' gaming experiences to understand their application of virtual learning across curricula. Educators need to choose the appropriate game for the particular subject to endorse their instruction and promote collaboration among students.

==== Multimodal composition: podcast, audio, video crafts in digital storytelling ====
Students who engage in collaborative learning for creating digital production show the characteristics of leadership. Moreover, students would gain the experience of collaboration and expand their skill of the multimodal literacy. In addition, digital composition provides a meaningful tool for teachers to assess. (Brenner, 2014)

=== Applications for ELLs ===
Multimodal literacy can facilitate English learners' literacy learning. It has provided opportunities for English learners to expand the interpretation of texts. (Ajayi, 2009) Specifically, English language learners can increase their language ability through computer-collaborative learning. The multimodality platforms provide students, especially ELLs with an anxiety-free zone to collaborate with their peers in a virtual world in order to make meanings together. Technology self-efficacy increases ELLs' level of independence and reduces their level of anxiety. (Mellati, Zangoei & Khademi, 2015) ELLs will have more motivation and self-confident while participating in online group projects to make contributions and share knowledge with their peers. As a result of collaborative learning, ELLs would expand their vocabulary, gain advanced and more academic grammars.

== CSCL in Post-Secondary Education ==
=== Overview of CSCL in Post-Secondary Education ===
==== Research on CSCL in post-secondary education settings ====
The applications of CSCL in post-secondary education demonstrate positive impacts on students' learning such as promoting learner interaction, motivation and understanding. As collaborative learning is grounded in social constructivism, the interaction and collaboration during learning is valued.

==== Developing Professional Skills ====
There's research findings that shows online students had higher scores than face-to-face students in professional competence acquisition test, showing the effectiveness of CSCL in promoting the development of professional skills

==== Knowledge Building ====
Knowledge co-construction among geographically dispersed students in an online postgraduate program was explained in a study as students relied heavily on each other for their on-going participation in the online discussions and joint refinement of ideas introduced.

=== Design Principles & Instructional Strategies for CSCL in Post-Secondary Education ===
The design principles for using CSCL can be considered from different perspectives. For technical use, instructors need to provide tutorials and online training modules to students. For collaboration, students need time to plan and coordinate group work as well as instructors' support and guidance on the discussions. Also, group size and composition should be taken into consideration for better quality of interaction. More instructional strategies are presented below.

==== Project-Based Settings Using Wikis ====
Wikis is a tool for learners to co-construct knowledge online with the access to create and edit contents. There are three phases of using wikis for collaborative writing:

Phase 1. Crisis of Authority

Users experience challenges due to unfamiliarity with the use of wiki and the unknown of other teammates' boundaries of being commented or revised on their writings.

Phase 2. Crisis of Relationship

Collaborative learning emerges and group communication is improved.

Phase 3. Resolution of Crisis

More frequent communication occurs and increased co-writing among team members.

To better design wiki-based project, the design principles design include:

1. Provide learners with a practice article to edit at the beginning of a course for getting familiar with using wikis

2. Informs learners of different communication tools to work collaboratively.

3. Engage learners with repeated wiki article assignments.

4. Provide timely feedback on students' discussion, participation and interaction.

==== Online Learning Management Systems ====
The characteristic of social interaction in CSCL can be demonstrated on the online learning community where learners can communicate with each other. One of the medium facilitating the online community to work is online learning management system that provides all people including learners, professors, and administrative staff to communicate.

When using an online learning management system for collaborative learning, the instructor should provide technical training by presenting video tutorials, online training modules or online workshops

==== Mobile Computer Supported Collaborative Learning ====
Mobile CSCL (mCSCL) is beneficial to students' learning achievements, attitude and interactions. The suggested design principles from CSCL include:

1. An idea group size is around 3 to 4 people.

2. A duration between 1 and 4 weeks demonstrate better effects. The criticisms version indicate in the case of short term course the interactions networks not consolidate.

=== Professional Teaching Community ===
Professional teacher communities are positively related to student learning, teacher learning, teacher practice and school culture. Teacher collaboration is a significant element of these communities. Reflection‐oriented tasks (such as reflection on teaching performance in individual writing, peer feedback, and collective writing) stimulated participation, and in combination with task structure also interaction in these communities. Furthermore, structured tasks(such as crossword puzzles, the path to come to a solution is unambiguous and answers can be immediately checked) which required critical reflection on personal experiences and perspectives triggered task‐related communication and a deep level of information exchange.

=== Distance Learning ===
The European Union Comenius fund sponsored FISTE project which is concerned with the educational use of information and communication technologies (ICTs), specifically with the development and dissemination of a new pedagogical strategy for distance learning through in-service teacher education in schools across Europe. This project uses the online Virtual Learning Environment platform BSCW as a Computer Supportive Communication Learning tool to facilitate the way the participants work together. This work has involved schools and teacher training providers, building culturally different work in in-service teacher education in the participating countries. The value of using CSCL supported technology for in-service teacher education in Europe lies in the concept of hinterland. Cross-national courses like the FISTE would be difficult to run without this technological approach.

== See also ==
- Collaborative information seeking
- Educational technology
- Intercultural communicative competence in computer-supported collaborative learning
- Mobile Computer Supported Collaborative Learning
- Online community of practice
- Virtual Collaborative Learning
