= List of people from Boca Raton =

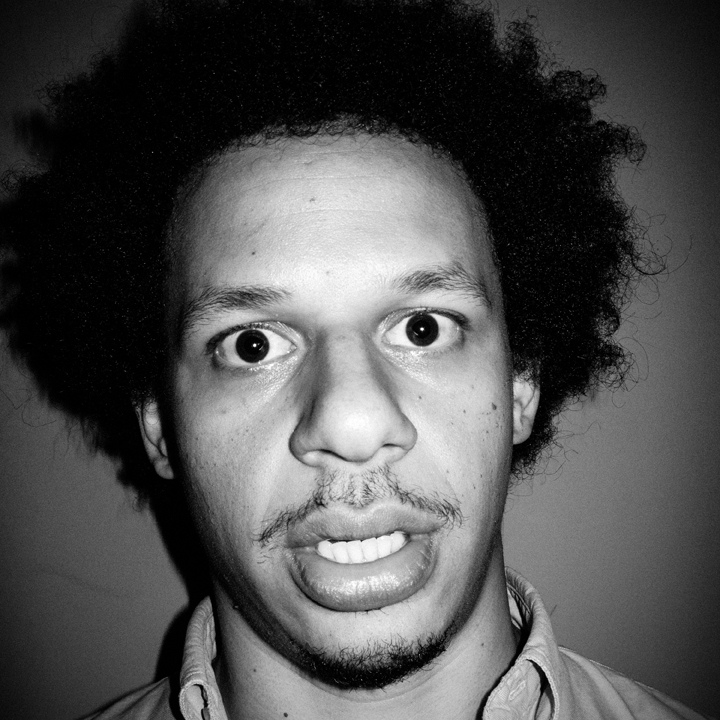
Eric Andre

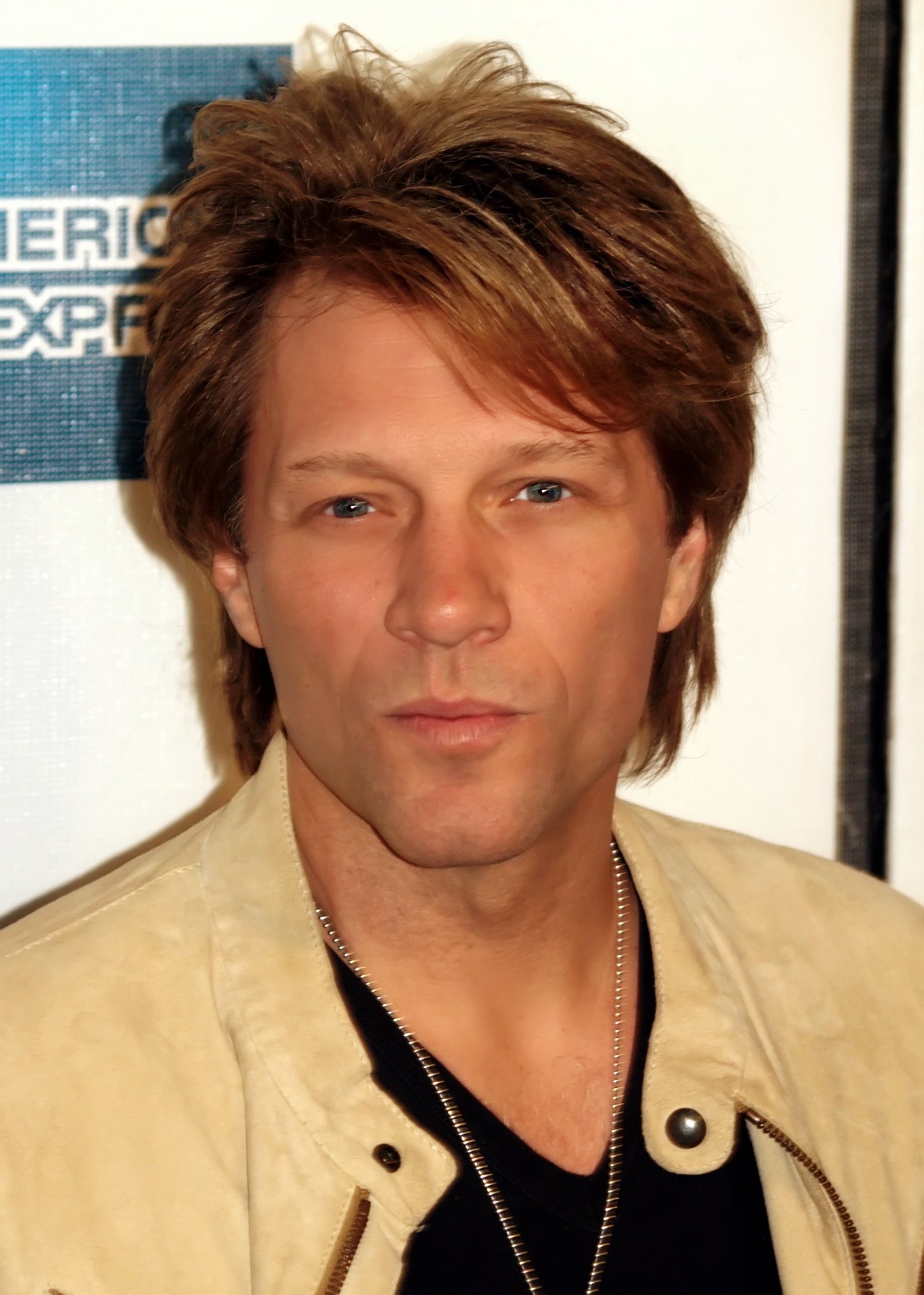
Jon Bon Jovi

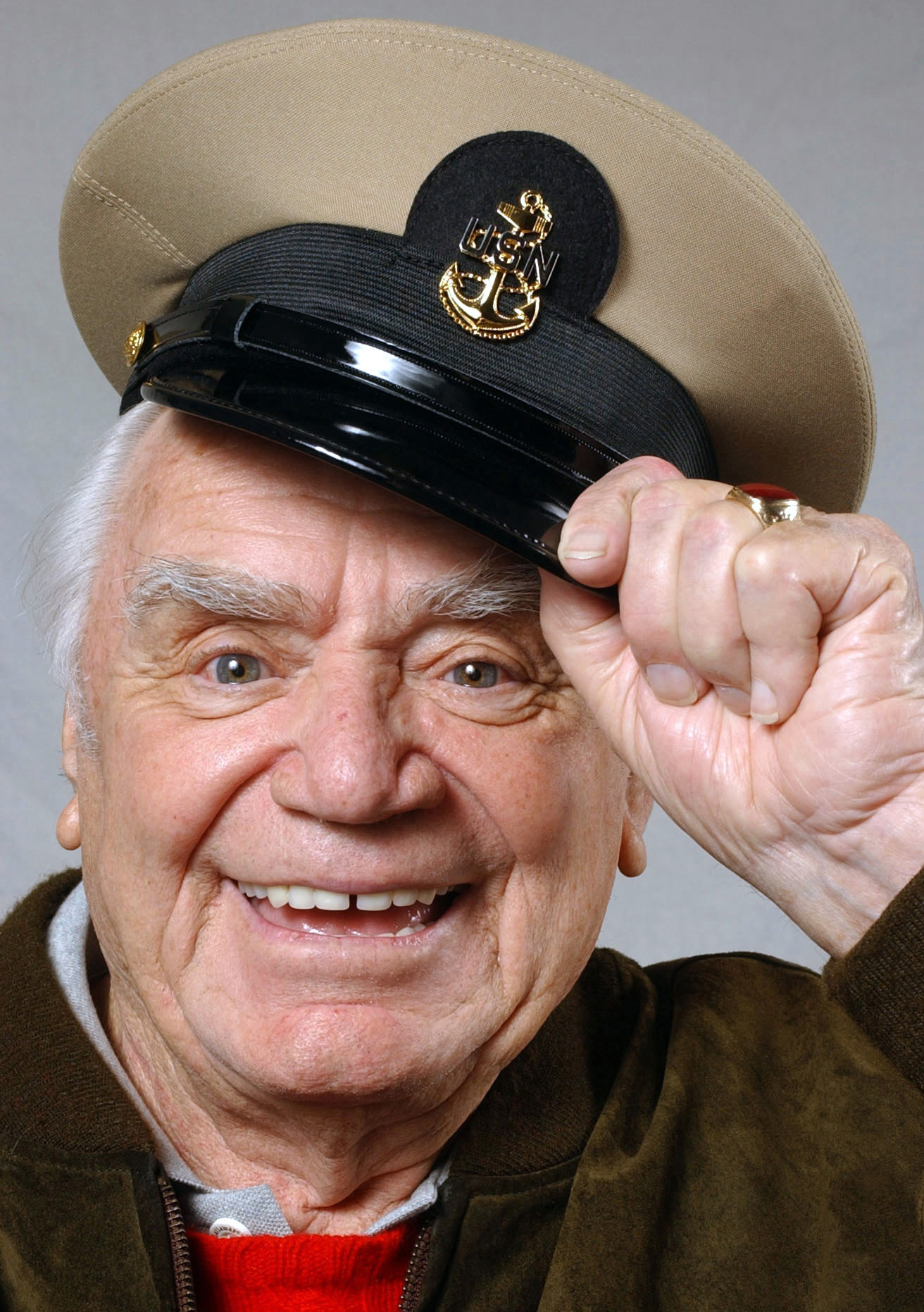
Ernest Borgnine

Chris Evert

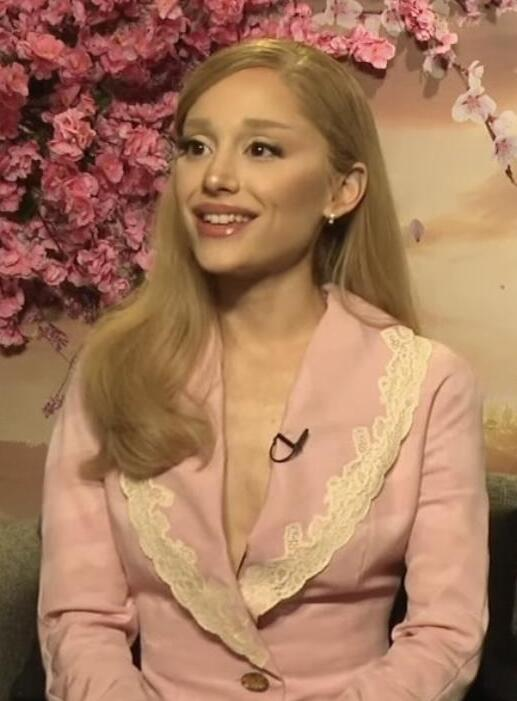
Ariana Grande

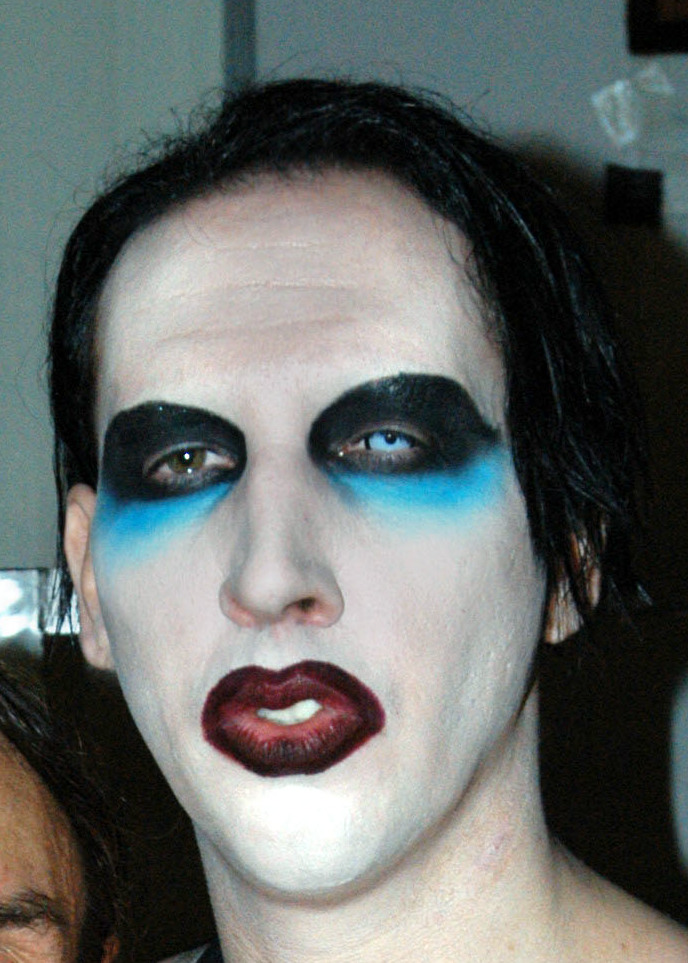
Marilyn Manson

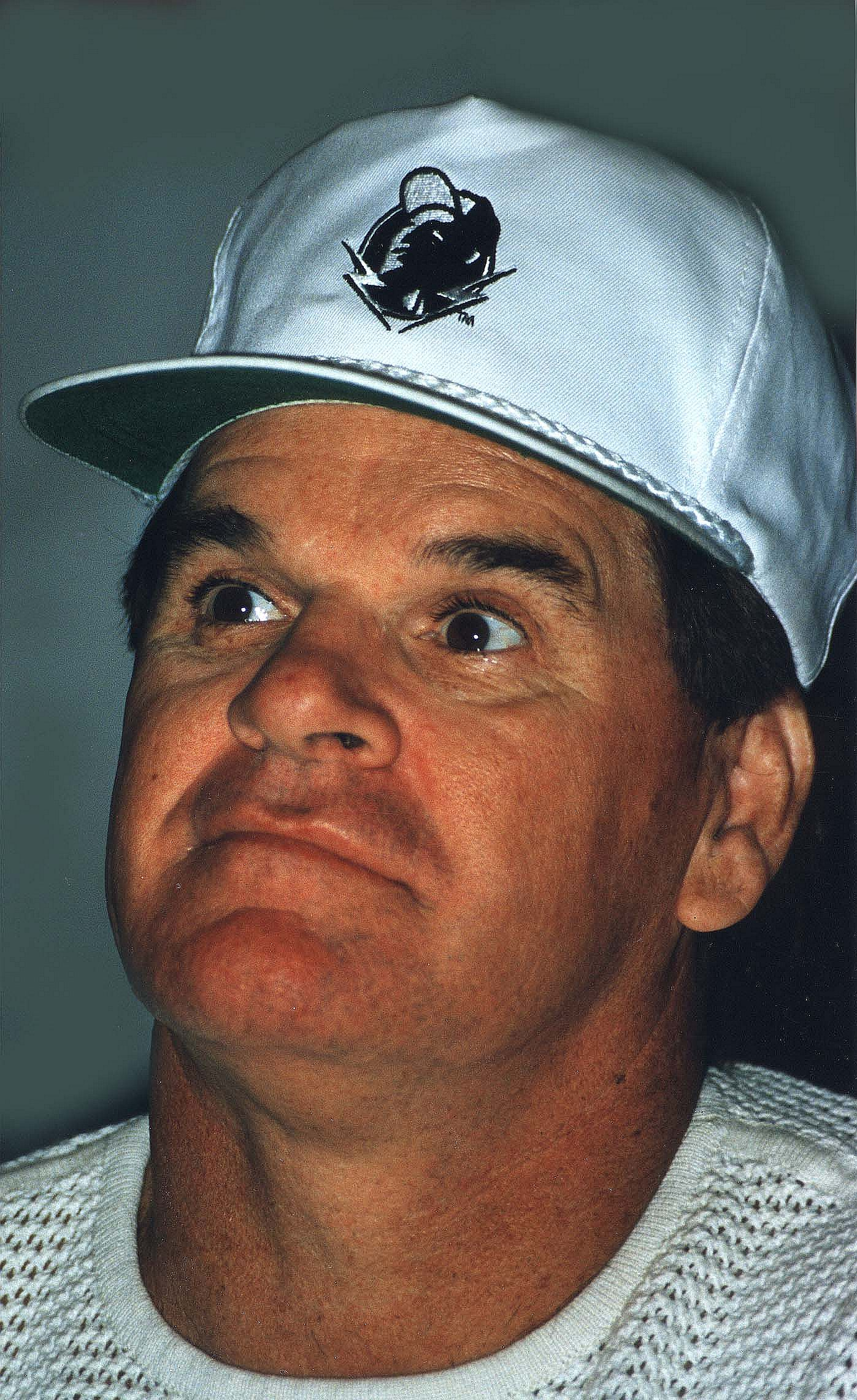
Pete Rose

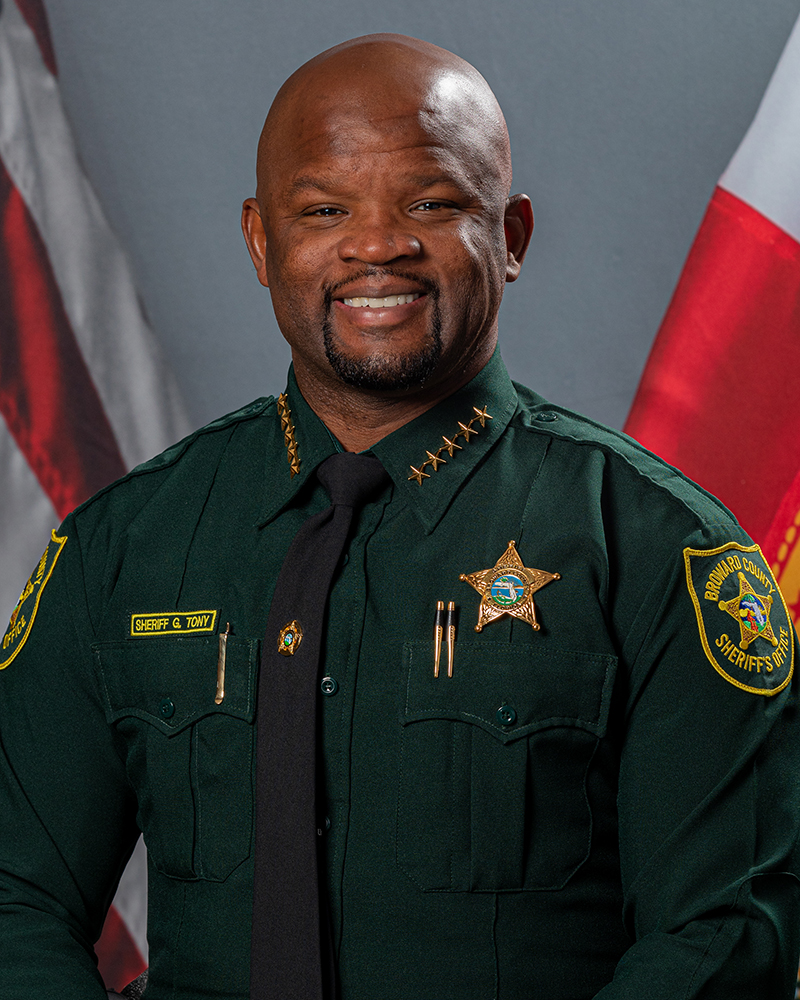
Gregory Tony

The following is a list of notable people who were born, who live, or formerly lived in the city of Boca Raton, Florida.

- A.J. & Big Justice (Andrew "A.J." Befumo and his son Eric Befumo), social media personalities
- Reed Alexander, actor
- Jozy Altidore, soccer player
- Eric André, comedian
- Victoria Azarenka, Belarusian tennis player
- Carling Bassett-Seguso with husband Robert Seguso, both tennis players
- Alfred F. Beiter, former US Congressman
- Vitor Belfort, former UFC Light Heavyweight Champion, retired UFC fighter, current professional boxer
- Derek Bell, motor racing driver
- Sean Berdy, actor
- Yvenson Bernard, football player
- Yuniesky Betancourt, baseball player
- Jeanne Bice, founder of Quacker Factory
- Ian Bishop, former English association football player
- Ryland Blackinton, musician/guitarist for Cobra Starship
- Jon Bon Jovi, singer and musician
- Jason Bonham, rock and roll drummer; son of Led Zeppelin drummer John Bonham
- Boots, musician and record producer
- Ernest Borgnine, actor
- Don Brewer, drummer for Grand Funk Railroad
- Rebecca Brooke, actress
- Keith Byars, former football player
- Daniel Cane, co-founder of Blackboard, Inc. and Modernizing Medicine
- Jennifer Capriati, tennis player
- Chris Carrabba, lead singer and guitarist of Dashboard Confessional
- Cris Carter, All-Pro football player
- Ethan Carter III, professional wrestler (billed as from Boca Raton, Florida)
- Noah Centineo, actor
- Connie Chung, tabloid and news media personality, spouse of Maury Povich
- Jakob Chychrun (born 1998), hockey player for the Washington Capitals
- Jeff Crowe, former New Zealand cricketer
- Elena Dementieva, Russian tennis player
- Dion DiMucci, Rock and Roll Hall of Fame member
- Don Drumm, country singer
- Wayne Dyer, author
- Rashad Evans, former UFC Lightheavyweight Champion, current UFC fighter
- Chris Evert, 18-time grand slam tennis player
- Frank Field, TV personality, and NYC meteorologist for five decades
- Mark Gilbert, Major League Baseball player, and U.S. ambassador to New Zealand and Samoa
- Jeff Gordon, NASCAR racer
- Steffi Graf, tennis player
- Ariana Grande, singer, songwriter, and actress
- Frankie Grande, stage actor, producer, TV host, YouTube personality, dancer and singer
- Taurean Green, basketball player
- Kenneth C. Griffin, hedge fund manager, entrepreneur and investor
- John Grogan, author of Marley & Me
- Sébastien Grosjean, French tennis player
- Megan Hauserman, reality show star and contestant
- John W. Henry, one of the owners of the Boston Red Sox
- Scott Hirsch, boxing manager and former e-mail spammer
- Ryan Hunter-Reay, IndyCar Series driver
- Greg Hyman (1947–2026), toy inventor who was co-creator of Tickle Me Elmo, the vibrating, giggling stuffed doll
- Žydrūnas Ilgauskas, basketball player
- Khori Ivy, former football player
- Greg Joseph (born 1994), football placekicker for the Minnesota Vikings of the National Football League
- Don King, boxing promoter
- Don Kirshner, music publisher, rock music producer, talent manager, and songwriter
- Kira Kosarin, actress, singer
- Dennis Kozlowski, former CEO of Tyco International
- Byron Krieger (1920–2015), foil, sabre, and épée fencer; NCAA champion; two-time Pan Am gold medalist; two-time Olympian; two-time Maccabiah Games gold medalist
- Bernhard Langer, golfer
- Allison Lefcort, artist
- Jesse Levine (born 1987), American-Canadian tennis player
- Scott Levine, computer criminal
- DeDe Lind, glamour model
- Hector Lombard, former Bellator Middleweight Champion, current UFC fighter
- Ruth Madoff (born 1941), wife of Bernie Madoff
- Marilyn Manson, shock rocker
- Leonard Marshall, football player
- Mathew Martoma (born 1974 as Ajai Mathew Mariamdani Thomas), hedge fund portfolio manager, convicted of insider trading
- Tucker Max, writer
- Nicko McBrain, Iron Maiden drummer
- Vince McMahon, professional wrestler and promoter
- Scott Mersereau, professional football player for the New York Jets
- Andy Mill, Olympic ski racer and ex-husband of Chris Evert
- Corina Morariu, tennis player
- Jaclyn Nesheiwat, beauty queen, fashion model
- Greg Norman, golfer
- Petter Northug, Norwegian cross-country skier
- Tristan Nunez, professional racecar driver
- Terry Pegula, billionaire natural gas tycoon and owner of the Buffalo Sabres and the Buffalo Bills
- Sabby Piscitelli, football player for the Tampa Bay Buccaneers
- Danny Porush, entrepreneur, investment banker
- Maury Povich, tabloid and news media personality, spouse of Connie Chung
- Morgan Pressel, golfer
- Guillaume Raoux, tennis player
- Mark Richt, head football coach of the University of Miami
- Andy Roddick, tennis player
- Pete Rose, baseball player
- Frank Rosenthal, ex-Las Vegas casino owner and handicapper
- Adin Ross (born 2000), twitch streamer
- Marion Ryan, 1950s British singer
- Sheryl Sandberg, COO of Facebook
- Logan Sargeant, Formula One racing driver
- David Schneider (born 1955), South African-Israeli tennis player
- Ben Shapiro, conservative political commentator
- Ryan Shore, Grammy and Emmy-nominated composer
- Vince Spadea (born 1974), tennis player
- Scott Stapp, lead singer for the rock band Creed
- Howard Stelzer, avant-garde composer and founder of Intransitive Recordings
- Anna Tatishvili, tennis player
- Horia Tecău, tennis player
- Sahaj Ticotin, lead singer for the rock band Ra
- Gregory Tony (Class of 1997), Sheriff of Broward County, Florida
- Jeff Tuel, Jacksonville Jaguars quarterback
- Danny Valencia (born 1984), Major League and Team Israel baseball player
- Alan Veingrad (born 1963), NFL football player
- Brian Voss, bowler
- Blair Walsh, All-Pro football kicker for the Minnesota Vikings
- Sean White, starting QB for Auburn Tigers
- Ernie Wise, UK comedian and half of the double act Morecambe and Wise, had a holiday home here, where he spent much of his time after Morecambe's death in 1984
