= TerraServer =

Terraserver may refers to either of two databases for viewing geospatial imagery:

- Terraserver.com, a commercial web site
- TerraServer-USA, which hosts public domain United States Geological Survey aerial images on Microsoft servers
