= Matthew Pittinsky =

American entrepreneur and academic

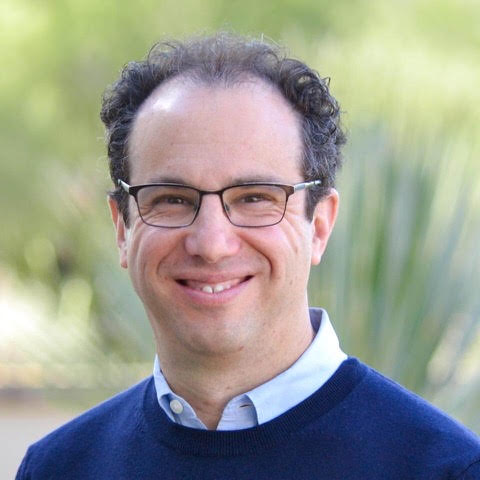
- Education: American University, Harvard Graduate School of Education
- Occupation: CEO of Parchment
- Known for: Co-founder of Blackboard Inc along with Michael Chasen, Stephen Gilfus, Daniel Cane

Matthew Pittinsky is an American technology entrepreneur, educator and academic. He is the former CEO of Parchment and a co-founder of Blackboard Inc. Pittinsky is a visiting scholar at Arizona State University.

== Early life ==
The youngest of four children, Matthew Pittinsky grew up in a family of educators. His father worked as a university administrator, and was the president of the local school board. Pittinsky's mother was a teacher at a public elementary school.

As a child, Pittinsky was interested in technology and used his family's Atari 800 to program in BASIC and later learned to program on an Atari 1040ST. He was also active in Boy Scouts, earning the rank of Eagle Scout. Pittinsky wanted to become a teacher from an early age, though he initially struggled as a student and had to repeat failed classes in summer school. After high school, he attended American University with the goal of becoming a social studies teacher. At American, Pittinsky was student body president his senior year. He graduated in 1994 with a bachelor's degree in political science. While at American, Pittinsky met Michael Chasen, who would later become his business partner. The two met after Pittinsky borrowed a printer from Chasen. They later became roommates and fraternity brothers. After graduating from American, Pittinsky earned a Master's of Education in 1995 from Harvard Graduate School of Education.

== Career ==
=== Early career ===
While at Georgetown, Pittinsky developed software for online college admissions applications with Chasen. They called the venture Search and Apply Group. Pittinsky and Chasen were unable to sell the idea to universities and later abandoned the project.

In 1995, Pittinsky took a job at KPMG Peat Marwick as a higher education consultant. Chasen was hired by KPMG the following year and together they created technology solutions for universities. In 1996, while jogging along the Charles River near Harvard, Pittinsky had the idea to create online software for course instruction.

Pittinsky and Chasen left KPMG to start Blackboard in 1997. They used computers loaned from their boss and also stole desk chairs by using them to move the borrowed computers out of the office.

=== Blackboard Inc ===
Pittinsky founded Blackboard LLC, with Chasen in 1997. At the time of the company's foundation, it operated as a consulting group to the IMS e-Learning standards project, where Pittinsky was an early member. In 1998, Blackboard LLC merged with CourseInfo LLC, an online learning software company developed by Cornell University students Stephen Gilfus and Daniel Cane, to create Blackboard Inc. CourseInfo had already developed a product and found a market fit by selling to 15 premier institutions. The company renamed CourseInfo's Interactive Learning Network Product into Blackboard CourseInfo.

Between 1997 and 2008, Pittinsky worked in several roles at the company, including chairman and CEO, co-CEO, and executive chairman. He was responsible for building the Blackboard brand along with Chasen through conferences, list-serves, marketing and networking. Pittinsky also shaped corporate strategy and product strategy, and oversaw the company's relations with the education community.

In 2002, while at Blackboard, Pittinsky co-wrote and edited a book called The Wired Tower on e-learning and the internet's impact on education. Pittinsky helped take Blackboard public in June 2004. The first day of trading raised US$70 million for the company, becoming the second most successful technology IPO of the year.

Pittinsky resigned from his executive duties in 2008, yet remained chairman of Blackboard's board of directors. Pittinsky and Chasen sold Blackboard to private-equity firm Providence Equity Partners in 2011, following a $2 billion valuation.

=== Academia ===
Pittinsky left Blackboard in 2008 after completing his Ph.D. in Sociology of Education from Columbia University through Teachers College. After earning his Ph.D., he was hired as an assistant professor of sociology at Arizona State University in January 2009. His academic research specialized in economic sociology, sociology of education, and social network analysis.

While at Arizona State, Pittinsky created a research project that used data collected from student ID cards to track student transactions and understand student social and academic activities. As of August 2024, he remains a non tenure-track visiting scholar of sociology at Arizona State.

=== Parchment ===
While at Blackboard, Pittinsky became interested in creating a company to help users manage academic credentials. He was later introduced to Docufide, a company founded in 2003 that specialized in the online transfer of academic transcripts from high schools to colleges and universities.

In January 2011, Pittinsky invested in Docufide and was hired as the company's CEO. In April 2011, the company rebranded as Parchment and Pittinsky helped launch Parchment.com, the company's consumer site, later that year.

Under Pittinsky's leadership, the platform has grown from 800,000 users in 2011 to approximately 1.6 million users in 2014. He has led the company through multiple rounds of financing which, as of 2020, have brought in a total of $66 million in investments. He has also helped expand Parchment's services to allow users to store and transfer transcripts, use academic data such as test scores and GPA to find matching institutions, and determine their likelihood of acceptance.

During his time at Parchment, he became an advocate for the adoption of Postsecondary Achievement Reports (PAR), which are documents that include both traditional academic records, such as grades, and information about student's development and learning experiences. Pittinsky was CEO of Parchment until 2020, when it was acquired by Brentwood Associates. He continued as CEO under Brentwood from 2020 through the sale to Instructure in 2024.

== Awards and recognition ==
While at Blackboard, Pittinsky won several awards. In 2000, he was awarded a "Young Innovator" award from the Kilby Awards Foundation and an Ernst & Young award for "Entrepreneur of the Year for Emerging Companies in Washington, D.C." He was included in Washingtonian magazine's “100 People to Watch” list in 1999 and named to Washington Techway magazine's list of Top Under-30 Technology Executives in 2000. In 2001, he was named "Visionary of the Year" by the Northern Virginia Technology Council.

In 2012, Pittinsky received the President's Medal of Excellence from Teachers College.

== Personal life ==
Pittinsky lives in Arizona with his wife and three children. He is of Jewish descent and is a member of Congregation Beth Israel. Active as an angel investor, Pittinsky has invested in companies including SocialRadar, Interfolio, Picmonic, and Stellic. Pittinsky is on the boards of American University and New Classrooms. In addition to Blackboard and Parchment, he has been on the boards of The Institute for Citizens & Scholars (formerly the Woodrow Wilson National Fellowship Foundation), CampusLogic, the High Meadows Graduate School of Teaching and Learning (formerly the Woodrow Wilson Graduate School of Teaching and Learning), and Picmonic. Pittinsky was elected to the board of the Scottsdale Unified School District in 2024.
