= Commercial UAS Modernization Act =

- Long title: A bill to establish an interim rule for the operation of small unmanned aircraft for commercial purposes and their safe integration into the national airspace system.
- Announced in: the 114th United States Congress
- Sponsored by: Senator Cory Booker
- Number of co-sponsors: 5

Codification
- Acts affected: FAA Modernization and Reform Act of 2012
- Titles affected: U.S.C. Title 49 - TRANSPORTATION
- Agencies affected: Federal Aviation Administration

Legislative history
- Introduced in the Senate as S. 1314 by Cory Booker (D–NJ) on May 13, 2015; Committee consideration by United States Senate Committee on Commerce, Science, and Transportation

The Commercial UAS Modernization Act (S. 1314) is a bill introduced in the 114th Congress by U.S. Senators Cory Booker (D-NJ) and John Hoeven (R-ND) that would create temporary guidelines for the use of unmanned aircraft systems (UAS or UAVs) and regulations for the commercial drone industry. Most commercial use of drones in the U.S. is currently banned by the Federal Aviation Administration (FAA).

As of December 15, 2015, the bill is co-sponsored by Senators Heidi Heitkamp (D-ND), Mark Warner (D-VA), Ron Wyden (D-OR), and Jeff Merkley (D-OR).

== Background ==
The FAA runs six drone test sites in the U.S. In May 2015, the FAA released a program called the Pathfinder Program, which would expand drone testing by allowing certain companies the right to experiment using drones out of the line of sight of the operator. CNN, BNSF Railway and PrecisionHawk, a drone startup company, were included in the initial approval for the program. The FAA plans to analyze the data collected from the experiments as part of a fact-finding process.

In February 2015, the FAA released a set of draft regulations that would allow drone operators to fly commercial UAVs during daylight, under 500 feet in the air, and within the line of sight of the operator.

== Legislative details ==
S. 1314 would create an interim FAA rule that would allow for commercial use and testing of small drones. The bill’s provisions would apply until the FAA finalizes its own drone regulations.

If passed into law, the bill would allow people to operate small drones without needing an airworthiness certificate from the FAA if they met the following conditions:

- The operator submits proof of liability insurance to the FAA
- The operator passes tests on aeronautics and drone usage proficiency
- The operator demonstrates his or her ability to fly the drone within certain restrictions (time of day, visibility, air traffic control, operator health, preflight inspection, and airspace).

Additionally, the bill would create a new position within the FAA titled the Deputy Associate Administrator for Unmanned Aircraft. The FAA would establish a research and development data collection and analysis program at the William J. Hughes Technical Center, an FAA facility located near Atlantic City, New Jersey.

== Support ==
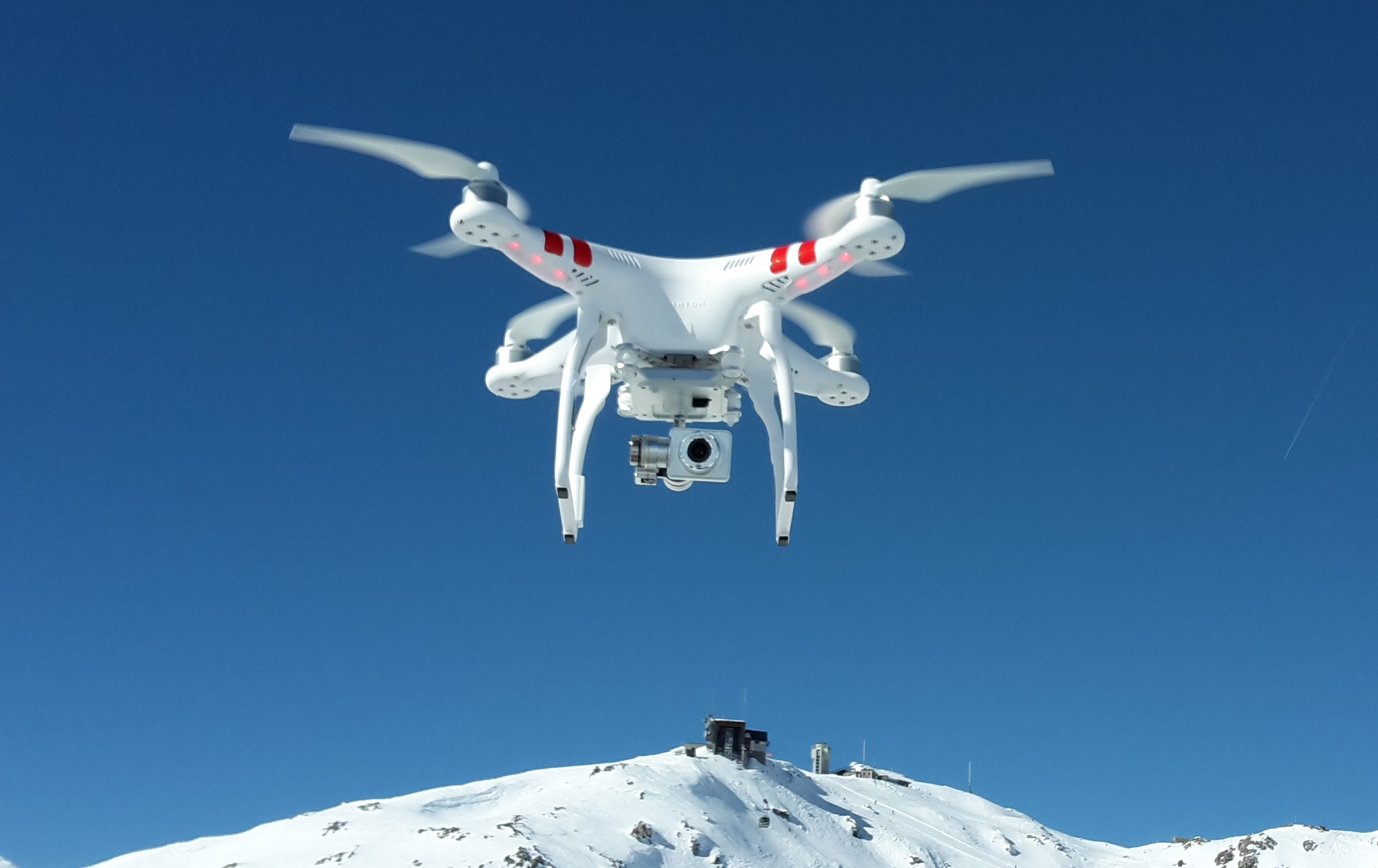
Example of a drone

Groups and companies that have publicly expressed support for the legislation include:

- Amazon
- Association for Unmanned Vehicle Systems International
- DJI (a drone manufacturer)
- Google
- Information Technology and Innovation Foundation
- National Association of Broadcasters
- Small UAV Coalition

Senator Booker has said that the drone industry expects that finalization of the FAA drone regulations will create over 100,000 jobs in the United States and have an economic impact of $82 billion.

== See also ==
- United States Department of Transportation
- Unmanned aerial vehicle
