= PrecisionHawk =

American drone and data company, 2010–2023

- Website type: Private
- Founded: 2010
- Dissolved: 2023
- Headquarters: Raleigh, North Carolina, United States
- Industry: UAV Systems and Aerial Survey

PrecisionHawk was a commercial drone and data company. Founded in 2010, PrecisionHawk is headquartered in Raleigh, North Carolina with another global office in Toronto, Canada and satellite offices around the world. PrecisionHawk is a manufacturer of drones (Lancaster) and has more recently focused heavily on developing software for aerial data analysis (DataMapper) and drone safety systems (LATAS). PrecisionHawk is a member of the U.S. Federal Aviation Administration Pathfinder Initiative and the NASA UTM Program. An angel investor in the company, Bob Young, founder of Red Hat, became CEO in August 2015. In August 2016, PrecisionHawk became the first U.S. company to receive an FAA exemption to commercially fly drones beyond the operator's visual line of sight.

== History ==
PrecisionHawk, originally "WineHawk," was founded in Toronto, Canada by Ernest Earon and Gabriele D'Eleuterio in 2010 as a manufacturer of autonomous, hand-launched, fixed-wing unmanned aerial vehicles used to dispel predatory birds over vineyards. Christopher Dean joined later that year as the company's first CEO. The direction of the company soon shifted with the addition of cameras to the aircraft that could provide clients with an aerial view of their fields.

The company rebranded itself as PrecisionHawk in 2012 as one of the first commercial drone companies focused on agricultural aerial data. Since then, PrecisionHawk began drone servicing for enterprise clients (2011), released its Lancaster drone (2012), founded DataMapper (2014), launched LATAS (2015), acquired TerraServer (2015), partnered with drone giant DJI (2016) and began manufacturing sensors (2016). Closing a series C round of investment in May 2016, PrecisionHawk's global investors include Intel, Dupont, Verizon, Yamaha, USAA and NTT Docomo. While agriculture continues to be a major market for PrecisionHawk, top industries also include energy, insurance, mining, construction, emergency response and environmental monitoring. Red Hat Inc. cofounder Bob Young, who served as PrecisionHawk's CEO from July 2015 till January 2017, handed over the reins of the company to another veteran of enterprise software, Michael Chasen, a cofounder and former CEO of education tech giant Blackboard Inc.

In January 2018 PreicisionHawk announced that the company raised $75 million in a round of funding led by Third Point Ventures, with participation from a number of other investors, including Intel Capital, Comcast Ventures, Verizon Ventures, NTT Docomo Ventures, Senator Ventures, Yamaha Motor, Constellation Technology Ventures, and Syngenta Ventures, the VC arm of agricultural giant Syngenta. According to the company's CEO the investment would be used to build upon its lead in the commercial drone space by expanding its team, developing its products, and making “strategic acquisitions." Shortly after, the company also announced that it was acquiring two commercial drone pilot networks, Droners and AirVid, thus creating a massive network of licensed drone pilots. The company said that it plans to merge both companies under the Droners brand to form an immediate network of 15,000 drone pilots, which would be used not only as a channel for connecting drone pilots with companies directly, but also serve PrecisionHawk’s own enterprise client base. Later in the year, in a bold move PrecisionHawk also announced that Eli Tamanaha, co-founder and former CTO of competitor DroneBase, was joining PrecisionHawk as Vice President of Strategic Initiatives. This newly created position will help the company accelerate the growth of PrecisionHawk’s Drone Pilot Network, Droners.io. He was fired less than one year later. On 11 December 2019, After burning through most of the invested capital, PrecisionHawk announced it had raised $32 million. Its total raised was around $130 million.

In January 2020, PrecisionHawk announced that James Norrod will be the new CEO of the company, replacing Michael Chasen who will be transitioning to an advisory role.

In December 2023, PrecisionHawk permanently shuttered and filed for Chapter 7 bankruptcy.

== Drones ==
The PrecisionHawk Lancaster drone is named after Ron Lancaster, a Canadian Football League quarterback. Since its initial release, there have been five iterations of the Lancaster. Lancaster 5 technical specs include:

- Type: Single electric motor (fixed wing)
- Weight (no payload): 2.4 kg | 5.3 lbs
- Max takeoff weight: 3.55 kg | 7.8 lbs
- Wingspan: 1.5 m | 4.9 ft
- Cruise speed: 12–16 m/s | 43.2 - 57.6 km/h
- Max speed: 22 m/s | 79 km/h
- Survey altitude: 50m - 300m | 164 ft - 984 ft
- Max operating altitude: 2500 m | 8,200 ft
- Survey area per flight: Approx. 300 acres at 100m / 328 ft altitude
- Flight time: up to 45 minutes
- Communications range: 2 km | 1.2 mi
- Processor: 720 MHz dual core Linux CPU
- Power source: 7000 mAhr
- Max operating temperature: 40C, 104F

Lancaster features a swappable payload bay for various camera sensors. Available sensors include visual, thermal infrared, multispectral, lidar and hyperspectral. PrecisionHawk offers in-house and out-bound training of its hardware offerings.

In May 2016, PrecisionHawk began selling DJI Matrice platforms in partnership with DJI. The "Smarter Farming Package" is a bundle of a fully assembled DJI Matrice with a 1-year subscription to PrecisionHawk's DataMapper software program. Multispectral and visual sensors are included in the package. A similar "Precision Aggregates Package" is also available for mining and construction applications.

== PrecisionMapper ==
PrecisionMapper is PrecisionHawk's drone software and data division. Available software includes:

- PrecisionFlight is a flight software that is a downloadable mobile application available on Google Play and the Apple App Store. The software is for users of DJI drones or the PrecisionHawk Lancaster and ensures quality data tags for accurate mapping and analysis.
- PrecisionViewer is a software application to review flight coverage on-site and add Ground Control Points. This software is compatible with all drones.
- PrecisionMapper Local is a desktop photogrammetry application for offline aerial imagery processing into 2D/3D orthomosaic maps. This software is compatible with all drones.
- PrecisionMapper Cloud, housed on PrecisionMapper.com, is a cloud-based photogrammtry and analysis software for offline aerial imagery processing into 2D/3D orthomosaic maps as well as automated data analysis using proprietary algorithms released as part of the Algorithm Marketplace. This software is compatible with all drones.
- The Algorithm Marketplace, sometimes called "AlgoMarket," is the first app store for drone data allowing users to gain insights from their 2D and 3D maps by selecting and applying algorithms that are developed by an in-house team of GIS scientists and in partnership with research universities and corporations. Current apps include volume calculations, plant count, plant height and vegetative health measurements (NDVI). The Algorithm Marketplace is available through PrecisionMapper.com.

== LATAS ==
LATAS (Low Altitude Traffic and Airspace Safety) is PrecisionHawk's drone safety platform launched as a platform to manage the millions of expected drones that will enter the airspace domestically and internationally. LATAS is available through a web dashboard and also in the DataMapper InFlight mobile application and allows a user to track their drone in relation to ground obstacles, such as buildings and powerlines, and air obstacles, such as airplanes and helicopters. Auto-avoidance technology is in development. The LATAS software is being used as part of PrecisionHawk's involvement in the FAA Pathfinder Initiative. Corporate LATAS partners include Verizon, Harris Corporation and Digital Globe. In 2016, LATAS signed an exclusive deal with Harris Corporation to integrate Harris' real-time manned aircraft data feed into LATAS so manned aircraft can be viewed live.

== TerraServer ==
In March 2015, PrecisionHawk acquired TerraServer, a commercial website specializing in aerial and satellite imagery. TerraServer gained international attention in the late 1990s as the first website to offer satellite imagery publicly on the internet. TerraServer is a reseller of imagery in partnership with DigitalGlobe and USGS among others. New GIS offerings through parent company PrecisionHawk are in development.
