= Kilby International Awards =

- Description: Award honoring major contributions to science, technology, and society
- Country: United States
- Presented by: High Tech Committee of the North Dallas Chamber of Commerce

The Kilby International Awards was an award created by the High Tech Committee of the North Dallas Chamber of Commerce, in 1990 to boost interest in the area. It was named after inventor Jack Kilby. The awards were bestowed at the Chamber's annual "Salute to High Technology" dinners, except for the 2003 Awards, which were held in London.

== Recipients ==
Awards were granted in 1990–1998, 2000 and 2003.

=== 1990 ===
- Truman Cook (Community Catalyst Award)
- Mark Fulbright (Student Innovator Award)
- Michael Hawley
- Bell Helicopter Textron

=== 1991 ===
- Wendy Copp (Young Innovator Award)
- Apple Computer
- EDS
- Rockwell International
- Tandy Corporation
- Texas Instruments
- Raytheon Corporation

=== 1992 ===
- Drew Gaffney
- Richard Smalley
- John Hagelin
- Fortune Education Summit

=== 1993 ===
- Francis S. Collins
- Candace B. Pert
- George F. Smoot
- Mae C. Jemison
- K. Eric Drexler (Young Innovator Award)

=== 1994 ===
- Robert D. Ballard
- Dean Kamen
- Stephanie L. Kwolek
- Michael A. Zasloff
- Mark A. Reed (Young Innovator Award)

=== 1995 ===
- Vinton Cerf
- Huda Zoghbi
- Harry Orr
- Hans Herren
- Jewel Plummer Cobb (Lifetime Achievement in Education Award)
- Tim Berners-Lee (Young Innovator Award)
- Marc Hannah (Young Innovator Award)

=== 1996 ===
- Steve Wozniak
- Helen Murray Free (Lifetime Achievement Award)
- Daniel Kaufman
- E. Clayton Teague
- Kay Toliver
- Mike McCue (Young Innovator Award)

=== 1997 ===
- James H. Clark
- Hector Floyd DeLuca
- Sylvia A. Earle
- Barry Marshall
- Francine Penny Patterson
- Susan Athey (Young Innovator Award)

=== 1998 ===
- Leonardo Chiariglione
- Jennifer Harris (Young Innovator Award)
- Florence P. Haseltine
- Karl M. Johnson (Lifetime Achievement Award)
- Zafra M. Lerman
- William E. Strickland
- Masashi Yanagisawa

=== 2000 ===
- Michael Chasen (Young Innovator Award)
- Matthew Pittinsky (Young Innovator Award)
- Linus Benedict Torvalds (Young Innovator Award)
- Frances Anne Cordova
- Bran Ferren
- Hendrik Mario Geysen
- Margaret Lowman
- Martin Schwab
- Ada Yonath

=== 2003 ===
- Onesmo K. ole-MoiYoi
- Dame Bridget Ogilvie
- Ralf David Hotchkiss
- Mamphela Aletta Ramphele
- Janna Levin (Young Innovator Award)
