= Helen Murray Free =

American chemist and educator (1923–2021)

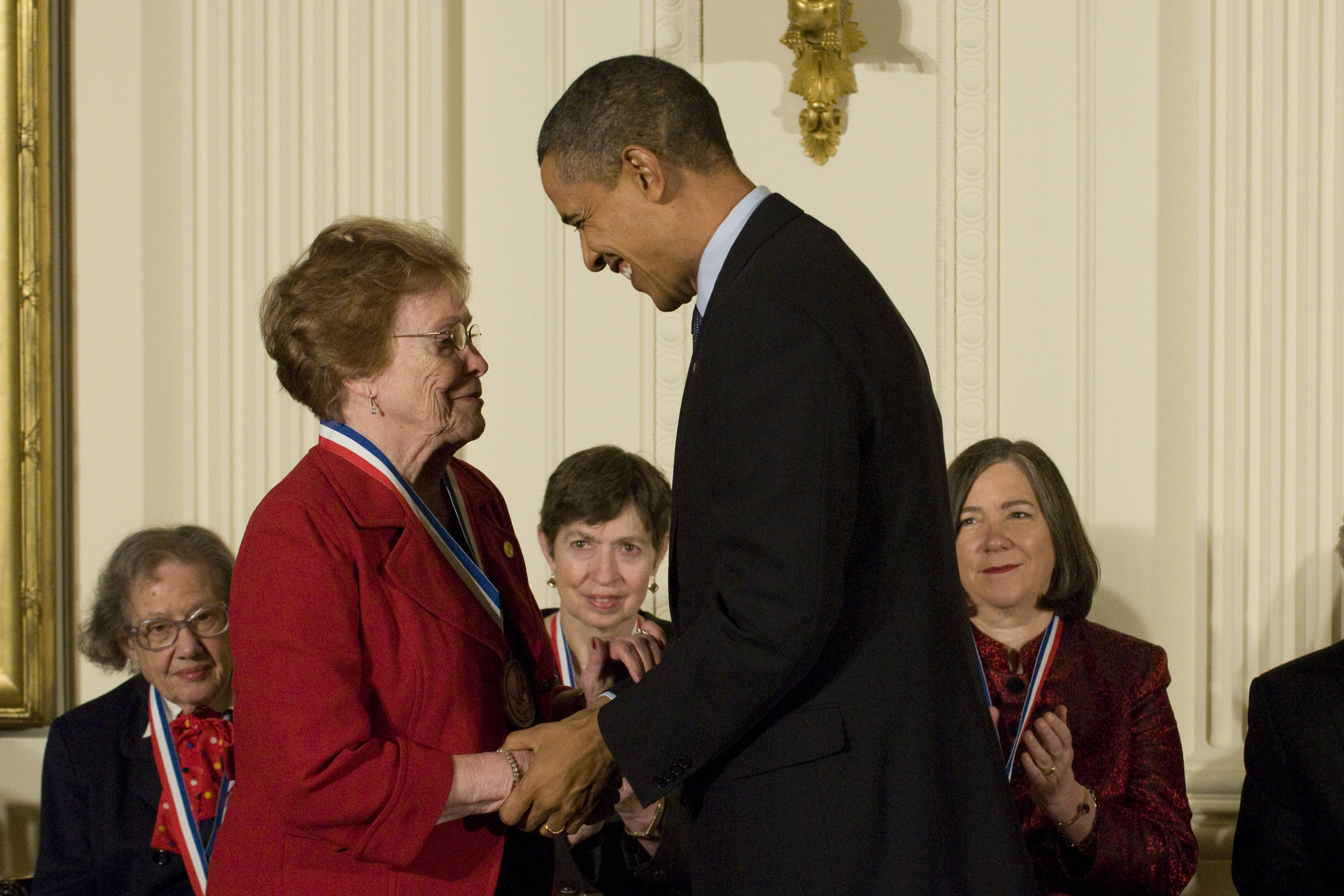
- Helen Free receiving the National Medal of Technology and Innovation from President Obama, 2010
- Born: Helen Murray; February 20, 1923; Pittsburgh, Pennsylvania, U.S.
- Died: May 1, 2021 (aged 98); Elkhart, Indiana, U.S.
- Education: College of Wooster (BS); Central Michigan University (MA)
- Known for: Self-testing systems for diabetes
- Awards: Garvan–Olin Medal (1980); Kilby Award (1996); National Inventors Hall of Fame (2000); National Medal of Technology and Innovation (2009); National Women's Hall of Fame
- Scientific career
- Fields: Chemistry

Helen Murray Free (February 20, 1923 – May 1, 2021) was an American chemist and educator. She is most known for her work on in vitro self-testing systems for diabetes and other diseases.

== Early life and education ==
Free was born in Pittsburgh, Pennsylvania, on February 20, 1923. Her father, James S. Murray, worked as a coal company salesman; her mother, Daisy Piper Murray, died during an influenza epidemic when Free was six.

Free received her early education from the public schools in Youngstown, Ohio, and graduated in 1941 as the valedictorian of Poland Seminary High School. While attending a summer camp at the College of Wooster, she set her heart on attending Wooster. Greatly influenced by her high school English teacher, she originally intended to major in English and Latin in hopes of becoming a teacher; however, these plans soon changed. In December 1941 when Pearl Harbor was bombed, many young men either enlisted or were drafted into the army. As a result of the vacancy within "male-dominated disciplines", women were encouraged to pursue careers in science. Consequently, Free switched her major to chemistry in which she obtained a Bachelor of Science in 1944. She described her switch to chemistry as the “most terrific thing” that ever happened to her.

== Career ==
Upon graduating from Wooster, Free immediately began working as a quality control chemist for Miles Laboratories (known as the creators of Alka-Seltzer), which involved testing the quality of ingredients in the company's line of vitamins. When Alfred Free had a position open in his biochemistry research group, she interviewed and filled the position. Little did she know that they would become lifelong research partners. They would marry two years later in 1947.

Originally they researched different antibiotics before they moved on to dry reagent systems. The first thing Alfred and his team were tasked with was further refining Clinitest to make it more sensitive. Clinitest was a tablet that measured glucose levels in the urine of diabetic patients when a diluted solution of urine was subject to a tablet. A resulting color change would be able to determine the corresponding glucose levels of the patient. The team also developed the Acetest, another tablet test for diabetes. Continuing with this trend of enabling clinical tests to be carried out in tablet form, the team created Ictotest, which tested for hepatitis A. This test was able to chemically detect the presence of bilirubin in urine, which was indicative of carrying the disease.

The Frees introduced Clinistix (the famous “dip-and-read” test) in 1956. It was the first dip-and-read diagnostic test strip for monitoring glucose in urine. They then worked to develop other strips that could test for key indicators of diseases, such as proteins and ketones. Eventually, they were able to create Multistix, which enabled a urine analysis that combined multiple tests into one strip. They did this by making an impermeable barrier between the multiple reagents on the strip. Several other testing strips were developed and added to the market, including Uristix, Ketostix, Dextrostix, Labstix, and the still-current product, Multistix.

Free moved into the Growth and Development Department in 1969, and she eventually became the director of Specialty Test Systems seven years later. She was Director of Marketing Services for the Research Products Division when Bayer Diagnostics acquired Miles in 1978.

Free also earned a Master of Arts in management (health care administration) from Central Michigan University (1978), and served as an adjunct professor of management at Indiana University South Bend.

By 1975, Free had earned seven patents for her improvements in medical and clinical urinalysis testing. In that year, she and her husband co-authored their second book, Urinalysis in Laboratory Practice, which is still a standard work in the field. She retired in 1982, but continued to work as a consultant for Bayer Diagnostics in Elkhart, Indiana.

=== Later years ===
After her retirement, Free became an active promoter of science education. She devoted special attention to educating both female and underprivileged students, through programs such as "Kids & Chemistry" and "Expanding Your Horizons."

== Personal life ==
In 1947 she married Alfred Free, a fellow researcher in urinalysis. Together, they had six children: Eric, Kurt, Jake, Bonnie, Nina, and Penny. Also, she helped raise three stepchildren: Charles, Jane and Barb.

Free died on May 1, 2021, at a hospice facility in Elkhart at 98 from complications of a stroke.

=== Awards and honors ===
In 1980, Free received the Garvan–Olin Medal, given to women for distinguished service in the field of chemistry. In 1996, she received the Kilby Award for lifetime achievement.

Free served as president of the American Association for Clinical Chemistry in 1990. Sixteen years later, she received its prestigious award for Outstanding Contributions to Clinical Chemistry.

Free was elected president of the American Chemical Society in 1993. The ACS named an award in her honor, the Helen M. Free Award for Public Outreach.

Free was inducted into the National Inventor's Hall of Fame in 2000. She was awarded the National Medal of Technology and Innovation a decade later by Barack Obama.

The work of Helen and Al Free in developing diagnostic test strips was designated a National Historic Chemical Landmark by the American Chemical Society on May 1, 2010, at the ETHOS Science Center in Elkhart, Indiana. She was inducted into the National Women's Hall of Fame one year later.

== Patents ==
- Free et al., U.S. Patent 3,087,794, " CHEMICAL TEST FOR DIFFERENTIATING LEUCOCYTES FROM ERYTHROCYTES"
- Free, U.S. Patent 2,912,309, “INDICATOR FOR DETECTING GLUCOSE”
