= Michael Chasen =

American businessman

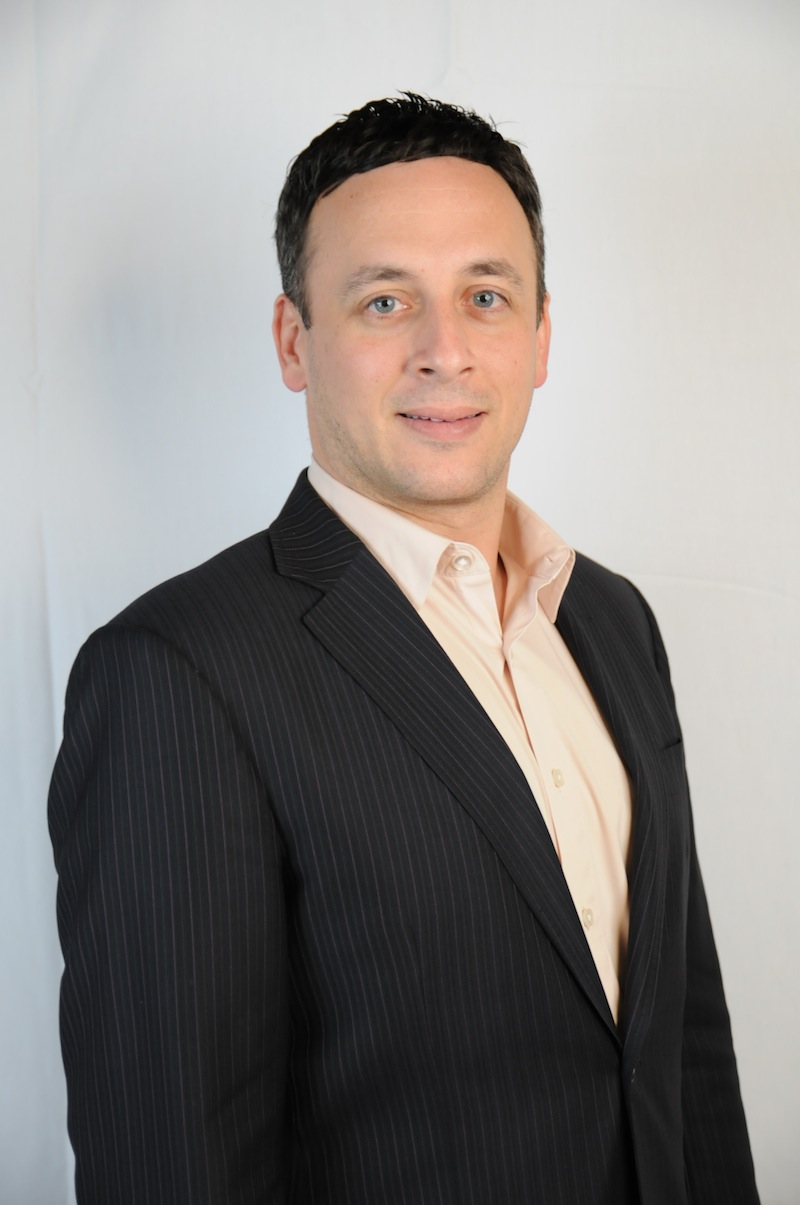
- Education: American University, Georgetown University
- Occupation: CEO of PrecisionHawk
- Known for: Co-founder of Blackboard Inc. along with Matthew Pittinsky, Stephen Gilfus, Daniel Cane
- Spouse: Randi Chasen
- Children: Skylar Pagie Chasen, Logan Chasen, Lily Chasen

Michael Chasen is an American businessman. He is a co-founder and former CEO of Blackboard Inc., a position he held from 1999 to 2012. In April 2013, Chasen co-founded SocialRadar, a technology startup company developing a location-based social app. In 2020, he co-founded ClassEDU, the maker of Class For Zoom, which aims to improve the effectiveness of Zoom-based remote learning.

== Early life ==
Michael Chasen grew up in Cheshire, Connecticut. He developed an interest in computers at age 10, and he began writing programs on his father's Radio Shack TRS Model III. He later used his skills to offer local businesses computer consulting while still in school. Also during high school, he was an active member of BBYO (B'nai B'rith Youth Organization).

Chasen attended American University and completed a degree in computer science in three years, graduating in 1993. While at American, Chasen worked part-time doing technology work for the FBI. He met future Blackboard co-founder Matthew Pittinsky in the American University dorms when Pittinsky wanted to borrow Chasen's laser printer.

Following his undergraduate degree, Chasen earned an MBA with a focus in accounting from Georgetown University's McDonough School of Business in 1995.

== Career ==
=== Early career ===
While still at Georgetown, Chasen was inspired by the application process to multiple undergraduate and MBA programs to start Search and Apply Group, a company that offered a computer application allowing colleges to accept online applications. After hearing about Search and Apply Group, Greg Baroni, who was Matthew Pittinsky's manager at KPMG Peat Marwick (now KPMG Consulting), offered Chasen a job. In 1996, Chasen left law school after completing one year to join KPMG as a consultant in the Higher Education Group.

During their time at KPMG, Chasen and Pittinsky observed that colleges were investing in connecting classrooms and dormitories to the Internet, but there was a gap in the adoption of software to aid learning.

Chasen and Pittinsky left KPMG in 1997 to launch their e-learning business. In an oft-cited anecdote, Baroni allowed them to borrow their computers while they got themselves set-up, a situation that Chasen and Pittinsky used to then steal their office chairs.

=== Blackboard ===
Chasen and Pittinsky founded Blackboard LLC, a consulting company developing IMS (Instructional Management System) standards for elearning based on a contract from EDUCOM and the National Learning Infrastructure Initiative, in 1997. In 1998, the company merged with CourseInfo LLC, a software provider which had developed a platform for internet and networked learning, which they called a "Course Management System" platform. The combined company became known as Blackboard Inc.

Chasen became chief executive officer (CEO) of Blackboard in 1999, as one of the youngest CEOs of a publicly traded company when he orchestrated Blackboard's initial public offering in 2004.

By 2012 Blackboard had grown to more than 3,000 employees with 20,000 clients in over 65 countries, and earning $600 million in revenue, and Chasen announced he would be stepping down as the CEO of Blackboard. Jay Bhatt was named as his successor.

=== SocialRadar ===
In 2013, Chasen founded SocialRadar, a D.C.-based mobile startup focused on building a social location app for smartphones and Google Glass. He is the CEO of the new company.

In June 2013, it was reported that Chasen had secured $12.75 million in a first round of investments. SocialRadar's app was planned to enter beta testing in July 2013 and was initially developed for iPhone, followed by Android and Glass. On January 30, 2014, SocialRadar was released to the Apple AppStore.

== Awards and recognition ==
Chasen was included in Forbes’ list of “America's 15 Most Powerful CEOs 40 And Under” and Washington SmartCEO named Chasen as its first CEO of the Year in 2006. Other recognition received by Chasen includes being named Ernst & Young's "Entrepreneur of the Year for Emerging Companies in Washington, D.C." and being honored as a "Young Innovator" by the Kilby Foundation. Chasen was listed by Washington Techway Magazine as one of D.C.'s "most-admired bosses" and was featured in Washington Business Forward's list of the Washington, D.C. area's "rising stars".

== Investments ==
Chasen is an active angel investor. His portfolio includes Parchment, EverFi, and several others. After announcing his departure from Blackboard, it was reported that Chasen would be pursuing additional investment opportunities.

== Personal life ==
Chasen lives in Bethesda, Maryland with his wife Randi and three children.

== See also ==
- History of virtual learning environments
