= Edline =

Former learning community management system

- Website type: Educational
- Available in: English
- Owner: Blackboard Inc.
- Website: www.edline.net
- Commercial: No
- Launched: May 15, 1997; 29 years ago
- Current status: Discontinued

Edline was a learning community management system used for school and class organization. It provided district, school, and classroom level website support for administrators, parents, teachers, and students from kindergarten through 12th grade. It is now discontinued.

The firm's website stated that its service was used by schools in all 50 U.S. states and had been featured in publications such as Newsweek. The firm acquired the earlier-established products of Jackson Software, the makers of Grade Quick, and Orbis Software, the makers of Easy Grade Pro.

== Usage ==
Edline was used in schools aiming to have paperless classes and homework. The teacher could upload material such as homework, class expectations, and progress reports. The website mainly helped parents see if students had missed any homework and allowed parents or students to e-mail teachers. It could have also served as an online class platform where it would have been possible for students to learn remotely.

Schools used Edline with social networks and applications such as Google Apps for Education.

In 2009, Archipelago Learning acquired a minority interest in Edline as part of its acquisition by Providence Equity Partners.

In October 2011, Edline merged with Blackboard. In July 2012, Edline announced they were being rebranded as Blackboard Engage.

During the 2014–2015 school year, some school districts across the nation started to replace Edline with other similar tools like Google Classroom, Schoology, Skyward, and Plus Portals. On December 31, 2018, Edline was discontinued.

== See also ==
- Google Classroom
