= Modernizing Medicine =

American software company

ModMed
- Type: Privately held company
- Industry: Software
- Founded: February 2010; 16 years ago
- Founder: Daniel Cane, Dr. Michael Sherling
- Headquarters: Boca Raton, Florida, United States
- Products: EMA electronic health records system, Practice Management, Analytics, Kiosk, Telehealth, Pathology module, Inventory Management, gGastro EHR, gPM, Endoscopy Report Writer
- Services: Revenue Cycle Management, MIPS Advisory Services
- Website: https://www.modmed.com/

ModMed (formerly Modernizing Medicine), is a United States software company headquartered at the Boca Raton Innovation Campus in Boca Raton, Florida. The company was founded in 2010 by Daniel Cane, CEO and co-founder of Blackboard, Inc., and Dr. Michael Sherling, Chief Medical and Strategy Officer and practicing dermatologist.

== History ==
Modernizing Medicine was founded in 2010 by Daniel Cane, who previously co-founded education-software company Blackboard Inc., and Michael Sherling, a practicing dermatologist who serves as the company's chief medical and strategy officer. The company is headquartered at the Boca Raton Innovation Campus in Boca Raton, Florida.

The company's first product was an electronic health records system designed for dermatology practices, developed with input from practicing dermatologists. Modernizing Medicine subsequently expanded into other specialties, including ophthalmology, orthopedics, gastroenterology, and plastic surgery.

== Legal ==
=== 2022 False Claims Act settlement ===
On November 1, 2022, the United States Department of Justice announced that Modernizing Medicine had agreed to pay $45 million to resolve allegations that the company had violated the False Claims Act and the Anti-Kickback Statute.

The settlement resolved a qui tam lawsuit filed in 2017 by Amanda Long, a former Modernizing Medicine vice president of product management, in the United States District Court for the District of Vermont. The Department of Justice intervened in the case in March 2022. The government's complaint alleged that the company had solicited and received kickbacks from pathology laboratory company Miraca Life Sciences in exchange for referrals, conspired with Miraca to donate electronic health records to providers in order to drive lab orders, and paid customers and others to recommend its software. As part of the settlement, Long received approximately $9 million.

In a statement reported by Fierce Healthcare, Modernizing Medicine denied the allegations and said it had agreed to settle in order to resolve the matter; the settlement agreement did not include any admission of wrongdoing.

== Products ==
The company provides specialty-specific electronic health records (EHR) systems, practice management software, revenue cycle management, patient engagement tools and data analytics for medical practices.

ModMed serves a range of medical specialties, including allergy, dermatology, gastroenterology, OBGYN, ophthalmology, orthopedics, otolaryngology, pain management, plastic surgery, podiatry, and urology. As part of its business model, ModMed employs practicing doctors to help program the software for each specialty.

The company operates by its 4000+ employees around the globe.
