= ANGEL Learning =

Educational software company

ANGEL Learning, Inc.
- Company type: Private
- Industry: Educational software, eLearning
- Founded: July 2000
- Headquarters: Indianapolis, IN, United States
- Key people: CEO and President: Christopher D. Clapp, VP and CTO: David Mills, VP and Chief Products Officer: Ray Henderson and Chief Visionary: Tony Leonard
- Products: ANGEL Learning Management Suite; ANGEL ePortfolio
- Revenue: Not disclosed
- Operating income: Not disclosed
- Net income: Not disclosed
- Number of employees: Not disclosed
- Website: http://www.angellearning.com

ANGEL Learning, Inc. was a privately held educational software company specializing in eLearning. Its main products were the ANGEL Learning Management Suite (LMS), ANGEL ePortfolio, and services offerings. In May 2009, it was acquired by Blackboard Inc.

== Background ==
ANGEL Learning and the ANGEL LMS evolved from research at Indiana University-Purdue University Indianapolis (IUPUI). The initial research system deployed in 1996 became Indiana University's OnCourse founded by Ali Jafari and David Mills. The ANGEL LMS was created using the early system concepts and was released by the newly formed CyberLearning Labs, Inc. in July 2000. The company later changed its name to ANGEL Learning. On May 6, 2009, competitor Blackboard Inc announced that it was purchasing ANGEL Learning with the merger's completion planned for the end of May, 2009.

== Products ==
=== ANGEL Learning Management Suite ===
The ANGEL LMS was used by K-12 schools and districts, community colleges, universities and proprietary schools to create Virtual Learning Environments for online learning and to offer hybrid or blended (web-enhanced) classes. Corporations also use the system for online corporate training. The final version, 7.4, was released in April 2009. It was for all students of the United States

=== ANGEL ePortfolio ===
ANGEL ePortfolio was used by students to create an electronic portfolio of their digital work. Schools use ANGEL ePortfolio to collect and report on data for accreditation purposes. The final version, 2.1, was released in June 2008.

=== Services ===
ANGEL Learning also offers services such as training, implementation, integration, and application hosting.

== R&D projects ==
=== Open Source Contributions ===
ANGEL Learning contributed source code to the development of the IMS/GLS Common Cartridge Digital Content and to educational wiki development through a source code contribution to TiddlyWiki.

=== Second Life ===
ANGEL Learning created and maintained ANGEL Learning Isle in Second Life. The island was open to educators for educational experimentation in the use of virtual collaboration technologies for online learning. The San Jose School of Library and Information Science was working with ANGEL Learning on a project to integrate Second Life with the ANGEL LMS.

== Partnerships ==
ANGEL Learning had a number of partners who either offer content in the ANGEL format or integrations to the ANGEL LMS. Some of these partners included BigGyan, Elluminate, Emantras, Pearson Education, SMARTHINKING, Tegrity, Turnitin, Wiley, and Wimba.

== Awards ==
The ANGEL LMS received several industry awards, and ANGEL Learning was also recognized by various organizations. Awards include:

- 2009 CODiE Finalist - Best Classroom Management Solution for preK-12
- 2009 CODiE Finalist - Best Postsecondary Course or Learning Management Solution
- 2008 CODiE Finalist - Best Postsecondary Course or Learning Management Solution
- 2007 IMS GLC First Place Learn-Sat Award
- 2007 CODiE Award - Best Postsecondary Course Content Management Solution
- 2006 CODiE Award - Best Postsecondary Course Content Management Solution
- Parature Legend Makers Award

== See also ==
- E-Learning
- Learning management system
