= Scott Hirsch =

American internet entrepreneur (born 1966)

Scott O Hirsch
- Citizenship: American
- Education: Providence College
- Occupations: Businessman, boxing manager
- Website: scotthirsch.com

Scott O Hirsch is an American businessman and boxing manager. He started in the email marketing business in 1996 and later ran other businesses before becoming a boxing manager.

== Career ==
Hirsch started a commercial email marketing (spam) business in 1996. Hirsch sold the company for $135,000,000. Hirsch later entered the online adult video market as the proprietor of DoMeLive.com and its parent company, Internet Video Group (IVG), which Time described in 1998 as "one of the bigger cybersex sellers". IVG operated from a 22,000-square-foot facility in Pompano Beach, Florida.

In April 2011, Hirsch launched app-building product Appsbar. It was a desktop tool that allowed users to build customized apps for use on smartphones and tablets.

Hirsch later became a boxing manager, managing Jameel McCline and Cory Spinks among others. As of 2026 he was chief executive officer of Datasys Group, a Florida-based data and information technology company. He has been a contributor to Huffington Post, Young Upstarts, Silicon Angle, and BetaNews.
