= Allison Lefcort =

American painter

- Born: May 14, 1975 (age 51)
- Known for: Painting
- Notable work: Hillary Clinton, King Hussein, Queen Noor, Ellen DeGeneres, Disney characters
- Movement: Pop art
- Website: www.allisonlefcort.com

Allison Lefcort (born May 14, 1975) is an American pop art painter who has made works of rock stars, singers, political figures and Disney characters. Some of her more notable subjects are Hillary Clinton, Jim Morrison, Melissa Etheridge, Hugh Hefner, Ellen DeGeneres, and King Hussein of Jordan. Her work is influenced by Andy Warhol and Keith Haring.

== Personal life ==
Allison Lefcort was born the daughter of Robert and Ronni Lefcort, a Yale University alumni and a visual artist. When she was a little girl, Lefcort created a portrait of Dan Marino, which is displayed in her studio in Boca Raton, Florida.

She attended Spanish River High School in Boca Raton. While there she made a painting of the band The Doors, which was the genesis of her "pop art" style. She graduated from high school in 1993. Lefcort attended Skidmore College and majored in art. She decided to drop out of college when, successfully selling her works, an art teacher told her and her classmates to forget all they knew about art so that she could be taught properly. Her parents made a deal with her: If she attended the New York Art Expo and her work was recognized, she could pursue her career rather than return to college. She sold made beneficial contacts and sold three paintings at the expo. She didn't return to college and her mother, a supporter throughout her artistic career, is her publicist and manager.

Seeds of Peace, GLAAD and United Cerebral Palsy are charities that have benefited from Lefcort's artwork donations for fundraising. She has shared her love of art by teaching children's art classes.

== Career ==
=== Celebrity portraits ===
In 1992, when she was 17 years old, Lefcort's work was exhibited at the Greenwich Village Art Gallery, her first professional exhibition. Starting in 1991, Lefcort made paintings of the recipients of the Musicares's Humanitarian of the Year award. They are hung next to works by Peter Max at the Musicare's office in Los Angeles. In 1998, Lefcort presented the portrait of the recipient, Luciano Pavarotti, at the awards ceremony.

She was made a portrait of Hillary Clinton on 4' by 4' canvas. Lefcort also made a portrait that size for Ellen DeGeneres, who autographed a second painting Lefcort had made for herself. She made portraits of Barbra Streisand, and Mikhail Baryshnikov. Lefcort's painting of Roy Orbison is owned by the man who produced concerts for him, Brian Carabet. In 1998, she made a portrait of Sigmund Freud that was presented for auction at the "Freud Amongst the Arts" show and auction, Southeast Florida Association for Psychoanalytic Psychology.

By 2003, she made a portrait of Queen Noor and Hussein bin Talal, The King of Jordan, that were hung in the king and queen's palace. Lefcort also painted the portraits of Hugh Hefner, Charlie Chaplin, Ray Charles, Jodie Foster, Jim Morrison, and James Dean.

=== Walt Disney ===
In 2003 she was commissioned by Disney Fine Art to create paintings of characters, like Tigger and Mickey Mouse from Disney films. Lefcort created Abracadabra for Disney's publisher, Collector's Editions, to mark the 75th anniversary of Mickey Mouse. It was released in November, 2004. Events were held in stores in Europe, Japan and the United States to market the limited edition paintings.

== Themes, subjects and methods ==
Her work is noticeable for its monochromatic scheme of black, white and grey in the foreground, and bright bold colors of the background. She uses acrylic paints exclusively on paper, wood, or canvas to create her pop art portraits. She spends more time designing and drafting a portrait than painting the work. Lefcort’s says "boldness and simplicity are the keys to unlocking the imagery." Her work is influenced by Keith Haring and Andy Warhol. She says that "Boldness and simplicity are the keys to the success of my portraits. The vibrant color of the background accents the shapes and shadows and enhances the three-dimensional appearance."

Lefcort refers to images of celebrities from photographs, books or magazines to formulate the original image that she will make. She does not have her works reproduced to avoid licensing issues, instead, if she wants a second or more copies, she'll paint each separately. For instance, she made a copy of a Mikhail Baryshnikov painting, one of her first and favored, for a couple who wished to have the painting. Disney, though, does make reproductions of her work for their enterprise.

She generally paints portraits on 4' by 4' canvas, but has also painted images on guitars, like one made of Elvis and on smaller canvases.

== Exhibitions ==
- 1992 - Greenwich Village Art Gallery, her first professional exhibition.
- 1998 - "Freud Amongst the Arts" show and auction, Southeast Florida Association for Psychoanalytic Psychology
- 2003 - Christie's auction house in New York on February 5
- 2004 - "…and Justice for All" at Marcus Galleries
- 2004 - Disney's Collector's Edition at New York Artexpo
- 2011 - D23 Expo in Anaheim, California

== Collections ==
Liza Minnelli, Luciano Pavarotti, Dionne Warwick, Barbra Streisand, Phil Ramone, and Ellen DeGeneres have owned her works.
