= Terraserver.com =

Aerial imagery website

TerraServer
- Website type: Private
- Founded: 1997
- Headquarters: Raleigh, North Carolina, {{{location_country}}}
- Website: www.terraserver.com

TerraServer was a commercial website specializing in aerial and satellite imagery which was originally launched in 1997. It is owned and operated by TerraServer.com, Inc. in Raleigh, North Carolina. The company was previously named Aerial Images until May 2002 when the assets of Aerial Images were sold and the company renamed itself TerraServer.com, Inc.

== History ==
Aerial Images was a part of the original project that involved Microsoft and Compaq as a demonstration of the real-world scalability of SQL Server and Microsoft's Windows NT Server. Aerial Images brought in satellite imagery from Sovinformsputnik (the Russian Federal Space Agency) and Orbital Imaging Corporation (later renamed GeoEye). TerraServer expanded its partnerships and became an image provider for LandVoyage and the DigitalGlobe family of companies: GlobeXplorer and AirPhotoUSA, as well as imagery from the USGS and USDA.

After an agreement that ended in January 2000, the operations split into two pieces. Aerial Images kept the TerraServer.com domain name to create a commercial site selling custom selected imagery. Microsoft went forward with their own imagery project, which provides access to United States Geological Survey imagery. The Microsoft project used the TerraServer brand name in a variety of ways including terraserver.homeadvisor.com, terraserver.microsoft.com, and terraserver.msn.com. In 2003, Microsoft rebranded its research service as TerraServer-USA, and then Microsoft Research Maps. There may exist confusion between the two sites, because of the name similarity. However, TerraServer.com, Inc. is the sole owner of the registered trademark TerraServer. The "TerraServer" name is a reference to 'Terra', which is Latin for 'earth' or 'land'.

TerraServer.com, Inc. was acquired by PrecisionHawk in March 2015 and its site is currently down.

== Website ==
The TerraServer viewer allows users to select imagery from different dates and of different resolutions. While most of the TerraServer imagery is focused on high resolution, color, satellite and aerial imagery, TerraServer.com also offers Color Infrared Imagery, Panchromatic Imagery, Low Resolution Satellite Imagery, and topographic maps. Subscribers to TerraServer.com gain access to a drawing and measuring tool that can measure surface distance and area on the images. TerraServer also makes a number of image overlays available, including road names, FEMA flood data, earthquake data, landslide data, real estate parcels, parks, schools, hospitals, airports, and zip codes.
