= Microsoft Research Maps =

Online repository of US aerial imagery

Microsoft Research Maps (MSR Maps) was a free online repository of public domain aerial imagery and topographic maps provided by the United States Geological Survey (USGS). The site was a collaboration between Microsoft Research (MSR), Bing Maps, and the USGS. It was in operation from June 1998 to March 2016. It had 30,000 to 50,000 visitors per day as of January 2010. The site was renamed in 2010, prior to which it had been known as TerraServer-USA (formerly Microsoft TerraServer).

The site had black and white USGS aerial photographs of approximately 97% of the United States. In 2000, the USGS launched the new Urban Areas program, which will ultimately take high-resolution color aerial photographs of about 100 major American cities. MSR Maps had Urban Areas data for 40 cities.

Microsoft had announced that the MSR Maps web site was going to permanently close on May 1, 2012, but later changed that decision based on requests from users of the site. As of March 2016 the site is no longer available.

== History ==
Though it was online as early as December 1997, the site was formally unveiled June 24, 1998, as part of an 18-month agreement between Microsoft, Compaq, and Aerial Images of Raleigh, North Carolina. It was created as a demonstration system to advertise the scalability of Microsoft's Windows NT Server and SQL Server, and used images from the United States Geological Survey (USGS) and Sovinformsputnik (the Russian Federal Space Agency).

TerraServer was the brainchild of the Turing Award-winning researcher on database systems, Jim Gray. Before his death, Gray continued this work, developing Microsoft Virtual Earth and began a similar project that would become the Worldwide Telescope.

In January 2000, Microsoft and Aerial Images, now TerraServer.com, Inc., split their operations, creating two parallel TerraServer websites. The dualism caused confusion among web surfers until the Microsoft name change in 2010. TerraServer.com, Inc., which owns the trademark TERRASERVER, filed a lawsuit in 2008 in North Carolina federal court, seeking monetary damages and asking that Microsoft be stopped from using the TerraServer trademark.

The TerraServer name was a play on words, with Terra referring to the 'earth' or 'land' and also to the terabytes of images stored on the site.

== See also ==
- Terraserver.com
- The National Map
