= CourseInfo =

- Type: Private
- Industry: Educational Software
- Founded: Ithaca, N.Y. 1997
- Founder: Daniel Cane, Stephen Gilfus
- Fate: Merged with Blackboard Inc in 1997
- Headquarters: Ithaca, N.Y., United States
- Area served: USA
- Key people: Dan Cane, Stephen Gilfus
- Products: Teachers ToolBox, Interactive Learning Network 1.5, Blackboard's CourseInfo
- Revenue: Unstated
- Operating income: Unstated
- Net income: Unstated
- Number of employees: 7 (September 1997)
- Website: courseinfo.com

CourseInfo LLC, one of the two companies forming Blackboard Inc. was founded in 1997 by Daniel Cane and Stephen Gilfus while at Cornell University. They joined together to officially form the partnership known as CourseInfo and developed the company into a small course management software provider. The product at the time was called the Teachers Toolbox. In 1998, the CourseInfo team met two principals of Blackboard LLC while pursuing a grant for adaptive testing. Shortly after the two companies joined together to form what is now known as Blackboard Inc.

== Company formation ==
CourseInfo was formed in late 1996- early 1997, via a partnership agreement between Cane and Gilfus. Early on Cane had begun developing web based scripts for professor Cindy van Es at Cornell for her statistics class. This activity was mostly driven by Dr. van Es's desire for bringing technology in the classroom and Cane's experience with new technologies. As one of the five supercomputer centers holding up ARPANET—the precursor underpinnings of the internet—Cornell was an early implementation of email, web and technology usage. Cornell had been using computer based course technology such as PLATO since the early 1970s.

== Product development ==
In 1996, Cane wrote simple automated scripts for websites for instructors using the Perl programming language and Netscape 2.0. In 1997, after the founding of CourseInfo, version 1.0 of the "Teachers Toolbox" was launched including a series of named "Generator" tools including the course site generator, announcement generator, quiz generator, survey generator and other tools. Gilfus designed the features and functions and web design of the product through personal experience and instructor feedback while Cane developed the core technology of the product. Gilfus also led sales, marketing and product management for the company. Much of the company's initial communication was on educational listservs and web boards. In mid-1997, the "Interactive Learning Network" ILN 1.5, was released and installed at several academic institutions including Cornell University, Yale Medical School and University of Pittsburgh. The ILN was the first e-learning system of its kind to leverage and install on top of a relational database MySQL. Access control was added to provide security around course content. Guest access was provided for course shopping. In 1998, the CourseInfo product line (then the Interactive Learning Network or ILN) became the foundation for Blackboard's e-learning product line as Blackboard's CourseInfo. On April 29, 1998, the CourseInfo was among the first to implement emerging industry standards. On November 2, 1998, the company released CourseInfo 2.0, and on July 26, 1999, they released CourseInfo 3.0 CourseInfo 4.0. was released on October 26, 1999

On January 19, 2000, the company released CourseInfo Enterprise Edition.

Prior to the Blackboard–CourseInfo merger, Blackboard was focused on developing a prototype for IMS (Instructional Management Systems).

== Blackboard overview ==
Blackboard Inc. was formed by the joining of CourseInfo LLC, founded by Cane and Gilfus, and Blackboard LLC, founded by Michael Chasen and Matthew Pittinsky. Originally the Blackboard company began as a consulting firm contracting to the non-profit IMS Global Learning Consortium. In 1998, it merged with CourseInfo LLC, a small course management software provider that originated at Cornell University. The combined company became known as Blackboard Inc. The first line of e-learning products was branded Blackboard CourseInfo, but the CourseInfo brand was dropped in 2000. Blackboard went public in June 2004. It operated publicly until Providence Equity Partners purchased the company in 2011. As of January 2014, its software and services are used by approximately 17,000 schools and organizations in 100 countries.

== See also ==
- History of virtual learning environments
- History of virtual learning environments 1990s
