= Daniel Cane =

American businessman

- Born: Daniel Cane; Lake Worth, Florida United States
- Education: Cornell University
- Occupation: Entrepreneur
- Organization: Modernizing Medicine
- Known for: Co-founder of Blackboard Inc. along with Michael Chasen, Stephen Gilfus, Matthew Pittinsky
- Website: Official website

Daniel Cane is a founder of Blackboard Inc. and CourseInfo LLC. As of 2013, he is the CEO and co-founder of Modernizing Medicine.

== Biography ==
Cane grew up in Lake Worth, Florida, attended Lake Worth High School and graduated from Cornell University in Ithaca, New York in 1997 with a Bachelor of Science degree from the undergraduate business program at Cornell University Department of Applied Economics and Management. In 1997, during his senior year at Cornell, he co-founded CourseInfo LLC, a small e-learning company focused on the development of a new course management system.

In 1998, CourseInfo, founded by Cane and Stephen Gilfus, and Blackboard, founded by Michael Chasen and Matthew Pittinsky, merged to form Blackboard Inc. Its first line of e-learning products was branded Blackboard CourseInfo, but the CourseInfo brand was dropped in 2000.

In February 2009, Cane left Blackboard to found Kadoo, a web service that gives users 10 gigabytes of free space to upload and share photos, videos, files or other digital assets. The site owner retains control over their file space in the cloud. Cane created a social-sharing platform based on the concepts of relationship context searching. The Kadoo platform enabled the person sharing the information to control who had access and revoke permissions after the fact. Kadoo raised $5M in venture capital and was sold to 3Sixty Enterprises.

In July 2011 Blackboard was purchased for $1.6 billion by Providence Equity Partners.

As of 2013, Cane is the CEO and co-founder of South Florida-based Modernizing Medicine, a healthcare IT company. Co-founded by Cane and Chief Medical Officer Michael Sherling, M.D., the company has had five rounds of financing, the most recent round occurring in May 2017 with a $231 million investment by Warburg Pincus . Since founding the company in 2010, Cane's company raised a total of nearly $300M in funding and hired almost 800 employees.

In 2019, the company relocated their headquarters in Boca Raton, Florida, to the campus where the IBM PC was first invented.

Cane has been invited to speak at forums in Florida and other U.S. states, and in 2013 participated in The Human Experience, the first TEDx in Delray Beach. At the United Nations headquarters in New York, he was a panel member at the United Nations Economic and Social Council's Civil Society Forum: “Building Partnerships in the Field of Education through Science, Technology and Innovation.” He has also spoken on South Florida Technology Alliance CEO panels and other local technology events.

== Awards ==
- EY Entrepreneur of the Year (2015)
- Florida Business Ambassador Award
- Sun Sentinel Excalibur award (2013)
- Top Power Leader in Healthcare, South Florida Business Journal (2013)
- Health Care Innovation Hero in Medicine, Palm Beach County Medical Society Services (2013)
- Ultimate CEO Award, South Florida Business Journal (2013)
- 2012 Governor's Innovators in Business Award - Governor's Innovators Under 40 (2012)
- Entrepreneur Award, Best Startup, South Florida Business Journal (2011)
- Elected Vice chairman of the Board of Trustees FAU (2013)

== See also ==
- History of virtual learning environments
- History of virtual learning environments 1990s
- CourseInfo
- Blackboard Inc.
- Modernizing Medicine
