= Blackboard (company) =

American technology company

- Type: Privately held
- Industry: Educational technology
- Founded: January 21, 1997; 29 years ago Washington, D.C., U.S.
- Founders: Stephen Gilfus; Daniel Cane; Michael Chasen; Matthew Pittinsky
- Headquarters: Reston, VA, U.S.
- Number of locations: 18
- Area served: Worldwide
- Services: Platform and enterprise consulting, managed hosting, student and training services, online program management
- Revenue: $700 million (2018)
- Number of employees: 3,000 (2012)
- Parent: Providence Equity Partners Veritas Capital
- Website: www.blackboard.com

Blackboard, previously Anthology Inc., and before that, Blackboard, is an American educational technology company with corporate headquarters in Boca Raton, Florida. Blackboard is known for Blackboard Learn, a learning management system. Blackboard Inc. merged with Anthology in late 2021.

The company's last CEO was William L. Ballhaus, former president and CEO of SRA International, who was also named chairman and president, on January 4, 2016, following the resignation of Jay Bhatt, who had led Blackboard since October 2012. The firm provides education, mobile, communication, and commerce software and related services to clients, including education providers, corporations and government organizations. The software consists of seven platforms called Learn, Transact, Engage, Connect, Mobile, Collaborate and Analytics, which are offered as bundled software. The firm was founded by Stephen Gilfus, Daniel Cane, Michael Chasen and Matthew Pittinsky through a business combination in 1997, and became a public company in 2004. It operated publicly until it was purchased by Providence Equity Partners in 2011 and Veritas Capital in January 2020.

Once the North American market leader among learning management systems, it has continued to lose market share to D2L Brightspace and open-source competitors Moodle and Canvas, retaining only 17% of the market as of 2023.

== History ==
=== Early history ===
==== CourseInfo LLC ====
CourseInfo was founded in late 1996 as a software provider founded by Cornell University students Stephen Gilfus and Daniel Cane. Gilfus wrote the business plan for CourseInfo and its Interactive Learning Network product while an undergraduate at Cornell. CourseInfo (a dorm room start-up) with Gilfus as the business lead and Cane as the lead developer had developed an innovative new platform for internet and networked learning called a "Course Management System" by Gilfus. Gilfus as a product strategist and Cane as lead tech guru had already identified a market fit and defined a category, as well as built a portfolio of 15 institutional clients including Cornell University, University of Pittsburgh and Yale Medical School. The product was sold to schools on an annual FTE licensing model―a full school deployment enterprise model.

==== Blackboard LLC ====
Blackboard LLC. was founded on January 21, 1997 by Michael Chasen and Matthew Pittinsky and began as a consulting firm contracting to the non-profit IMS Global Learning Consortium to develop a prototype for online learning and thinking through online learning standardization. Chasen and Pittinsky started Blackboard after leaving KPMG Consulting where they both had worked as part of the company's higher education practice.

==== Blackboard Inc. ====
In 1998, after Cane met Chasen at a conference on adaptive learning, Gilfus and Cane decided to merge CourseInfo LLC. with Chasen and Pittinky's Blackboard LLC. company in order to raise money and scale the business. The combined company became a corporation known as Blackboard Inc. They renamed the CourseInfo platform built by the Cornell team to Blackboard's CourseInfo; the CourseInfo brand was dropped in 2000. As an extension of CourseInfo's original two weeks for free courses, the company provided a hosted version "CourseSites" for teachers to try out for free. After having raised its seed round, the new company made a profit in its first year, and its sales in 1998 approached US$1 million. Other early products included Blackboard Classroom and Blackboard Campus both derivatives of the original platform.

In 2000, Blackboard acquired iCollege/College Enterprises Inc.'s campus card, introducing commerce capability to Blackboard's portfolio.

By 2006, the firm's learning platform software was used in more than 40% of U.S. college campuses and the company had gained a significant worldwide market share. This expansion was initially funded through venture capital from a number of investors, including Pearson PLC, Dell, AOL, The Carlyle Group and Novak Biddle Venture Partners. At this time the company renamed its "Course Management System" product category into the "Learning Management Systems" category in order to sell to the corporate space.

Overseas expansion began in the early 2000s, growing to include Asia, Australia and Europe. Blackboard had its initial public offering (IPO) in June 2004 under the stock market ticker BBBB. Sale of shares in the initial public offering raised an estimated $70 million for the company, making it the second-most successful technology IPO of that year.

=== Company expansion and buyout ===
In 2006, Blackboard completed the acquisition of its largest competitor, WebCT Inc, enlarging its share of the higher education market to between 65 and 75 percent. Over the next five years, the company invested in a series of new products and acquisitions, including Blackboard Xythos, Blackboard Connect, Blackboard Mobile, Blackboard Collaborate, and Blackboard Analytics, thus expanding beyond the learning management system market.

By 2011, the firm's products were used by over half of colleges and universities in the US. On July 1, 2011, Blackboard agreed to a $1.64 billion buyout by an investor group led by Providence Equity Partners, completed on October 4, 2011. Following the sale, Providence Equity Partners merged Edline, its K-12 learning system, with Blackboard. Edline was later renamed Blackboard Engage.

According to a TechCrunch article from 2012, despite its success, Blackboard had become "one of the most disliked — even detested — companies in education." In December 2011, Fast Company reported that 93% of respondents to the Amplicate customer opinion survey "hate" the company.

In September 2017, Blackboard announced its expansion to the Indian Educational Market, and it was said to partner with 50 educational institutions.

=== New leadership ===
Jay Bhatt succeeded Chasen as CEO of the company in October 2012. He was the CEO of Progress Software. As CEO of Blackboard, Bhatt combined the company's product portfolio into offerings called "solutions". He also restructured the company by market (including North America and International) rather than by product, and consolidated product development and management under new executives. It was reported in July 2014 that approximately 500 of Blackboard's 3,000 employees were hired between 2013 and 2014.

In 2019, Blackboard Inc., announced that Edwin Scholte will be appointed Chief Financial Officer (CFO).

The company's key focuses under Bhatt's leadership have been: student-driven learning solutions; investing in Blackboard Learn, the company's core product; integrating the company's portfolio of products; and building education service offerings, such as online program management. In 2013, the company introduced a platform to host massive open online courses called MOOCs, and it introduced student profiles and databases in 2014. Bhatt also changed the company's strategy for acquiring new businesses. Rather than purchasing competitors, Bhatt has stated he prefers to acquire companies based on their innovations.

In July 2014, Bhatt announced multiple product changes, including a redesign of Blackboard's UX to an interface resembling iOS, expanding the deployment options of Blackboard Learn to include public cloud, and improvements to Blackboard's mobile app.

As of July 2014, Blackboard serves approximately 17,000 schools and organizations. It holds the highest share of the education market with 75 percent of colleges and universities and more than half of K-12 districts in the US using its products and services.

As of September 2014, Blackboard had acquired MyEdu, Perceptis, CardSmith, and Requestec under Bhatt's leadership. The acquisitions reflected Bhatt's new acquisition strategy of making investments that serve students and will lead to innovations in Blackboard's core teaching and learning products.

=== Bankruptcy ===
On September 30, 2025, it was reported that Anthology would be acquired by private equity firms Nexus Group and Oaktree Capital Management under a Chapter 11 bankruptcy reorganization, in which the company filed for bankruptcy that same day.

In March of 2026, Anthology rebranded back to "Blackboard", relaunching under its previous name.

== Mergers and acquisitions ==
Blackboard has used the acquisition of other companies as a strategy to both limit competitors and enter new markets. Between 2006 and 2012, the company spent more than $500 million on acquisitions.

Competing learning management platforms that were acquired by Blackboard in order to absorb their users and reduce competition include: George Washington University's course management software, Prometheus, in 2002; and WebCT Inc., its largest rival in the education software industry, in 2005. According to market research company Eduventures, the merger with WebCT increased the firm's share of the higher-education market to between 65 and 75 percent. In 2009, the acquisition of ANGEL Learning, an education software developer, increased Blackboard's client base to nearly 6,000 educational institutions, companies and government agencies.

The company has also made acquisitions in order to expand its product base with other education-related services and software. Such acquisitions include: NTI Group in 2008, which became the basis for Blackboard Connect; providers of online and mobile collaboration tools Wimba, Inc. and Elluminate, Inc. in 2010 to form Blackboard Collaborate; iStrategy in December 2010, which led to the creation of Blackboard Analytics; and Presidium Inc. in 2011, which developed into Blackboard Student Services. Following the company's merger with Edline in 2011, Edline was later renamed Blackboard Engage. In March 2012, Blackboard acquired Moodlerooms Inc. (a Moodle hosting provider) and NetSpot of Adelaide, Australia, which then became the basis of Blackboard's Open Source Services division.

As of June 30, 2018, Blackboard (which had been trading as "Moodlerooms" since 2012) was no longer a Certified Moodle Partner and can no longer use the Moodlerooms name or the Moodle trademarks that had been licensed to them to advertise their Moodle-related services.

From January 2014 to April 2015, Blackboard acquired nine companies, including: MyEdu, an Austin-based online education company; Perceptis, a provider of help desk and administrative services; CardSmith, a company that offered cards for student ID and on-campus payments; Requestec, a provider of technology for VoIP, video conferencing and instant messaging; ParentLink, a mass notification system and mobile app publisher; and Schoolwires, a company that specialized in building school websites.

In August 2015, Blackboard acquired Colombia-based Nivel7, possibly the largest Moodle services provider in Latin America.

Blackboard acquired Sequoia Retail Systems in May 2016.

Whilst still retaining a large market share in the US, Blackboard was overtaken globally by the open source Moodle, which became the dominant worldwide VLE.

== Operations ==
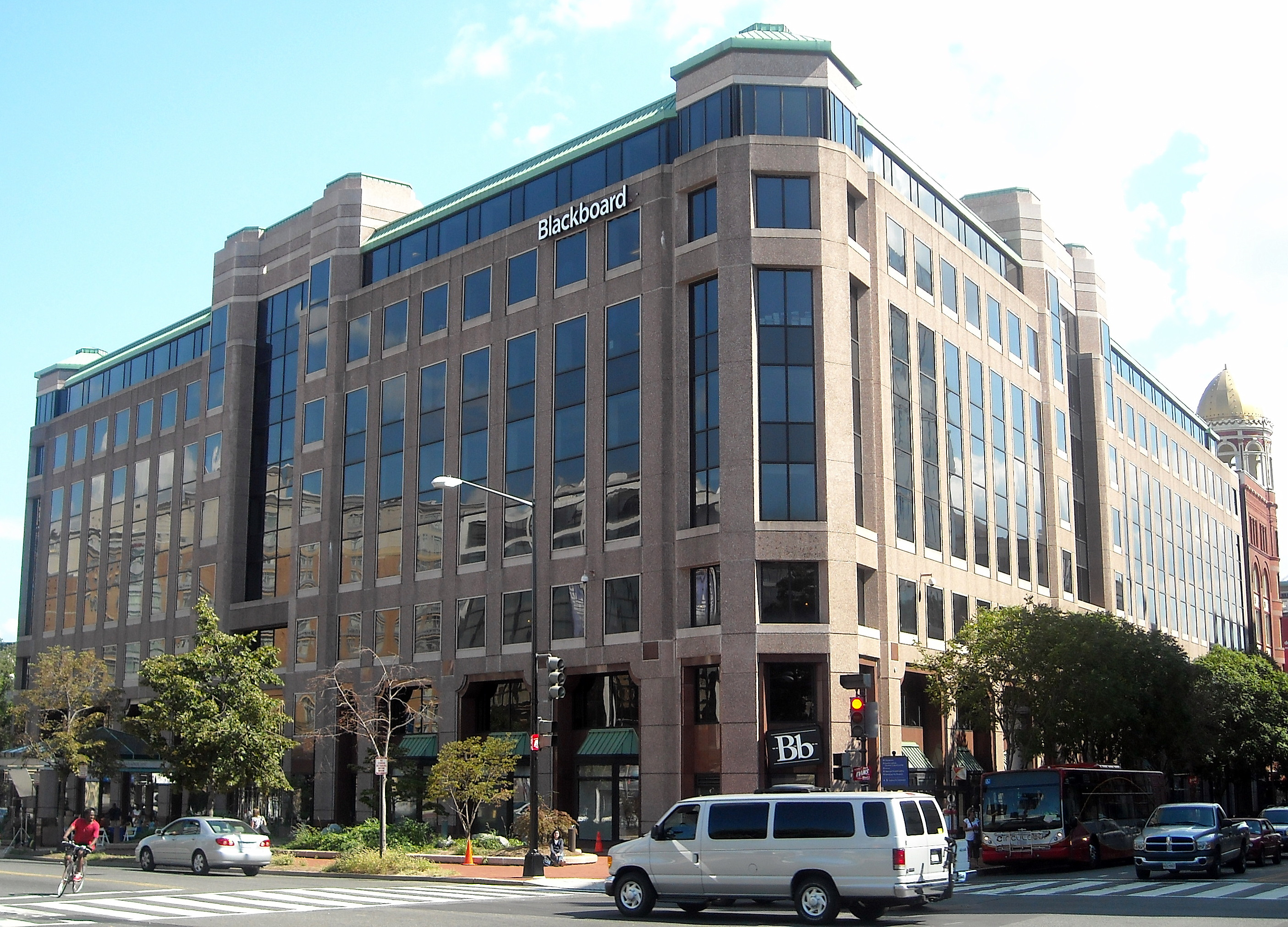
Blackboard Inc. previous headquarters at 650 Massachusetts Avenue NW, in Washington, D.C.

Though previously a public company, following its 2011 buyout by Providence Equity Partners Blackboard now operates as a private company. The company's headquarters are in Washington, D.C., and it has offices in Asia, Australia, Europe and in several locations in North America.

== Products and services ==
=== Blackboard ===
The initial product to be offered by the company was its course management software, first available in 1998. The latest version, Blackboard Learn 9.1, was released in April 2010. This is a learning management system that provides a learning system for course delivery and management for institutions; a community and portal system for communication; a content management system for centralized control over course content; and a system to record and analyze student assessment results.

Though the software is proprietary, developers are able to extend the functionality of the system, and create customized course management and delivery by developing software and applications known as Building Blocks, created by Gilfus and Pittinsky, which allows third-party developers to create customizations and extensions for Blackboard Learn through open APIs and web services. In 2011, the firm re-launched the original CourseSites offering, a free version of its Blackboard Learn and Collaborate software, for which it provides hosting and support.

In 2012, TechCrunch writer Rip Empson commented that Blackboard's focus on acquisitions prevented the company from fully focusing on their software products, which has led to the continual introduction of additional features, known as feature creep.

The company's products' user interfaces became "infamous as a part of academic life that was to be endured, not enjoyed" according to TechCrunch writer Rip Empson in 2014. According to educational technology company EdSurge, as of 2015, the company was in the process of updating its learning management system and the user interface within it, noting that navigation of the latter had been a cause of "dismay" for long-time users.

In March 2020, Blackboard agreed to its sell Open LMS business to Learning Technologies Group for $31.7 million.

=== Other products ===
Blackboard Collaborate was created in July 2010 and is used by K-12 schools and higher education institutions for professional development and distance learning. It is written in Java. The platform is also used by businesses for distance learning and for conferencing

The company launched Blackboard Mobile in 2009 after having acquired TerriblyClever. The platform provides students with access to teaching and learning content and campus information through mobile applications for iOS, Android, BlackBerry and WebOS devices. Blackboard Mobile allows students to both access course materials, check grades, participate in discussions, and to access information about campus life and services.

The company began providing its Blackboard Connect service in 2008, for use by school districts and higher education institutions to send out mass phone, text and e-mail notifications. The service can be used for routine alerts and notifications, academic or instructor notifications, or by school districts and communities to share time-sensitive information, such as in the case of natural disasters and campus emergencies.

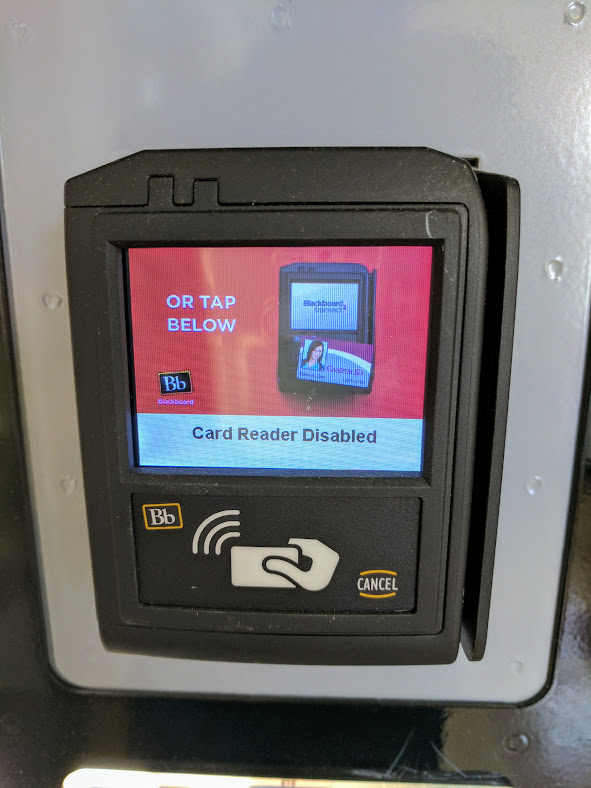
A Blackboard Transact card payment device affixed to a university vending machine.

Blackboard Transact, formerly Blackboard Commerce Suite, is transaction processing system tied to university ID cards, which can be used for meal plans, vending machines and laundry services, and an e-commerce front end for the transaction system. The Transact system is NFC-compatible and its ID cards use contactless technology. Blackboard Transact also includes a program for off-campus vendors that allow students to pay for goods using their college's campus card. In March 2019 Blackboard announced that Transact was to be spun off, having been acquired by Reverence Capital Partners.

Blackboard Analytics was developed after the company acquired iStrategy, a data analysis firm, in December 2010. The Blackboard Analytics platform is a system for data warehousing and analysis, with applications for educational institutions to analyze student numbers, class scheduling, and financial information. The platform was created as a business intelligence tool specifically for higher education institutions and uses data from colleges' student information, human resources and financial information systems.

Blackboard Open LMS was created when Blackboard acquired Moodlerooms and NetSpot in 2012. Blackboard saw significant growth in their open source group through 2018, before selling that division in 2020 to Learning Technologies Group.

=== Services ===
Blackboard's services include: managed hosting, platform consulting, enterprise consulting, online program management, training and student services.

Blackboard Student Services provides management services for student admissions and enrollment, financial aid, and student accounts and retention. It also provides IT and helpdesk support to students and faculty for learning management systems.

== Legal matters ==
The United States Patent and Trademark Office granted the company U.S. Patent 6,988,138 for "Internet-based education support system and methods" in January 2006. The patent established Blackboard's claims to the concept of connecting together web-based tools to create an interconnected university-wide course management system. The firm announced the patent on July 26, 2006, and on the same day it filed a patent infringement lawsuit against rival education software company Desire2Learn Inc. According to news reports, the awarding of the patent and the lawsuit against Desire2Learn led to concerns about patentability in the electronic learning community.

The website BoycottBlackboard.org was set up by Chris Hambly on August 2, 2006, calling for a boycott of the company's products and offering an online petition to be signed by those who opposed the patent. In addition, some critics of the patent and lawsuit created a Wikipedia article for the history of virtual learning environments to document existing examples of course management software. The Software Freedom Law Center filed a request with the U.S. Patent Office to re-examine Blackboard's patent in November 2006, and in January 2007, the request was approved on the basis of prior art, cited by the center, raising "substantial" questions. To address the concerns raised within the education software and academic communities, in February 2007, the firm announced that it had made a pledge to not assert its patent rights against open-source and non-profit software developers.

In February 2008, a federal jury in Texas ruled in favor of Blackboard in its patent infringement suit against Desire2Learn, finding the rival company liable for infringing on its patent. One month later, in March 2008, the U.S. Patent Office issued a preliminary decision following its re-examination of Blackboard's patent application, which rejected the 44 claims made by the company. The Patent Office stated that it would give a final decision following a review of the patent.

Following the ruling by the federal jury in February 2008, later that year Desire2Learn lodged an appeal with the United States Court of Appeals for the Federal Circuit. A ruling was made by the Court of Appeals on July 27, 2009, that the 38 patent claims made by Blackboard in its suit against Desire2Learn were invalid. The dispute was resolved, when Blackboard and Desire2Learn announced on December 15, 2009, that each company was settling all ongoing litigation between them and had made a cross-licensing agreement. In April 2010, the firm abandoned patent 6,988,138, and in November that year the company's legal counsel announced the patent's "official termination" and stated that Blackboard had ended its appeals.

== See also ==
- Courseinfo
- Virtual learning environment
