= Ubell =

Ubell is a surname. Notable people with the surname include:

- Alvin Ubell, architectural designer, building inspector, business owner, author, and TV and radio personality based in Brooklyn, NY.
- Earl Ubell (1926–2007), American innovative science and health reporter
- Robert Ubell, former Vice Dean of Online Learning at New York University Tandon School of Engineering

== Fictional ==
- Bill Ubell, a character in The Life Aquatic with Steve Zissou
