= Alvin Ubell =

American architectural designer

Alvin Ubell is an architectural designer, building inspector, business owner, author, and TV and radio personality based in Brooklyn, NY. He is an advocate for do-it-yourself home improvements and repairs that enhance safety, comfort and energy savings. He currently serves as vice president, senior inspector (partner) and founder of Accurate Building Inspectors.

== Background and Education ==
Born in Brooklyn, New York in 1933 to Russian-Polish immigrants, Alvin Ubell was raised speaking Yiddish. He is the third son of four brothers: Earl Ubell (1926), Seymour Ubell (1931), and Robert Ubell (1938).

Ubell graduated from Tilden High School in Brooklyn, NY. He attended Purdue University as an undergraduate and studied architecture at the Pratt Institute. He joined the U.S. Navy in 1953 during the Korean War as a 3rd Class Petty Officer serving two years as a radiological warfare technologist and damage controlman on the troop training vessel, the USS Randall APA 224.

== Career ==
During his early career, Alvin Ubell worked as a construction manager and architectural designer. He also worked as a cabinetmaker, carpenter, stair builder and draftsman.

In 1961, Ubell co-founded, with his wife Estelle Rita, Accurate Building Inspectors (ABI), a home and building inspection firm in Brooklyn NY. In 1983, Ubell’s son, Lawrence joined the company. In addition to providing inspection services within the Greater New York area, Ubell has provided expert testimony before the courts on matters involving construction standards and regulatory codes. He has also been interviewed by news organizations in matters of construction hazards and public safety.

== Television ==
From 1975 through 1981, the ABC Television Network hired Ubell to be featured as “Al Ubell” the “Household Hints & Safety Reporter” on the TV series Good Morning America (GMA). During the weekly morning segment, Ubell was allotted two minutes and thirty seconds to demonstrate various home improvements and do-it-yourself home repairs such as replacing a home door lock. During the approximate 250 episodes in which he appeared, Ubell was often joined by a Good Morning America host or reporter such as Steve Bell, David Hartman, Sandy Hill, Joan Lunden and others. At the end of each TV segment, Ubell signed off by saying either, “America, go forth and save energy” or “America, go forth and fix.”

From 1982-1983, Ubell worked on ABC TV’s “Kids are People Too”. Thereafter, Ubell appeared on the WABC-TV “Regis Philbin Show” from 1982–84 and then on the WCBS-TV “New York” show from 1983-1990. Subsequent TV appearances include the ABC-TV Home Show from 1991-1992, CNN and a recorded video for ABC Video Entertainment titled, “America Go Forth & Save Energy”.

== Radio ==
In 1981, Alvin Ubell made his first radio appearance on WNYC FM when Marty Wayne invited him as a guest on the “Senior Edition” program. When Leonard Lopate assumed the role of new host for the program in 1985, Ubell was invited again as a regular monthly guest. In 1997, Ubell was joined on-air by his second son, Lawrence Ubell. Writing in 2006 about the Ubells on WNYC radio, New York Times journalist Jennifer Bleyer explained,

The Ubells are father and son, a pair of short, sturdy men with piano-key smiles. As independent building inspectors who describe themselves as the “Gurus of How-To,” they appear once a month on Mr. Lopate’s afternoon program, doling out home-repair tips along with friendly banter in robust Brooklynese.

During the live radio broadcast of The Leonard Lopate Show, Ubell and his son advised WNYC callers on home improvements, building regulations, and preventive home repairs. The Ubells also challenged Lopate listeners with a word quiz derived from the building industry nomenclature. Ubell’s final guest appearance on WNYC FM was September 14, 2018.

Ubell also appeared on the ABC’s TalkRadio Network from 1984-1988.

In December 2018, Ubell and his son Lawrence joined the Leonard Lopate At Large show at WBAI New York 99.5 FM.

== Spokesperson ==
Ubell was a product spokesperson for several national companies including Black & Decker, Brooklyn Union Gas, Carrier Corp., Rust-Oleum Corporation, and Slant/Fin. He has appeared in ad campaigns such as the Oldsmobile AAA “Winter Driving Safety Tips” TV commercials. In 1982-83, Ubell was hired by General Electric to “promote the company's new "Quick Fix" program aimed at guiding appliance-buyers in making their own repairs on GE and Hotpoint washers, dryers, dishwashers, refrigerator-freezers and ranges.“

As a spokesperson, Ubell also wrote articles for Rust-Oleum and True Value.

== Publications ==
Ubell has written and co-authored several books on home improvement and repair which have been translated from English into Polish and French.

- Al Ubell's Energy-Saving Guide For Homeowners. Written by Alvin Ubell and George Merlis. (1980 & 2002)
- Save Energy, Save Money. Written by Alvin Ubell and George Merlis. (2001)
- Recipes For Home Repair. Written by Alvin Ubell and Sam Bittman. (1974 & 1976)

From 1980-2005, Ubell was “Household Hints & Safety Editor”, and contributing author for Family Circle magazine writing articles on safe housekeeping and home repairs.

== Membership ==
Ubell was a member of American Institute of Architects (AIA) and was a 1976 charter member of the American Society of Home Inspectors (ASHI) and chair person of the Ethics Committee at a time when home inspectors were not required to have licenses or permits, only insurance.

== Awards ==
- Achievement & Ethics, Institute of Jewish Humanities.(June 2000).
- American Hardware Manufacturers Association (August 1986).
- U.S. Consumer Products Safety Commission (Feb. 1982).

== Personal life ==
Alvin Ubell has three children from his marriage with Estelle Rita Ubell: Charles Ubell, Lawrence Ubell, and Anna Ubell Garcia.
