= Gregory Wooten =

American designer and musician (born 1961)

Gregory Thomas Wooten
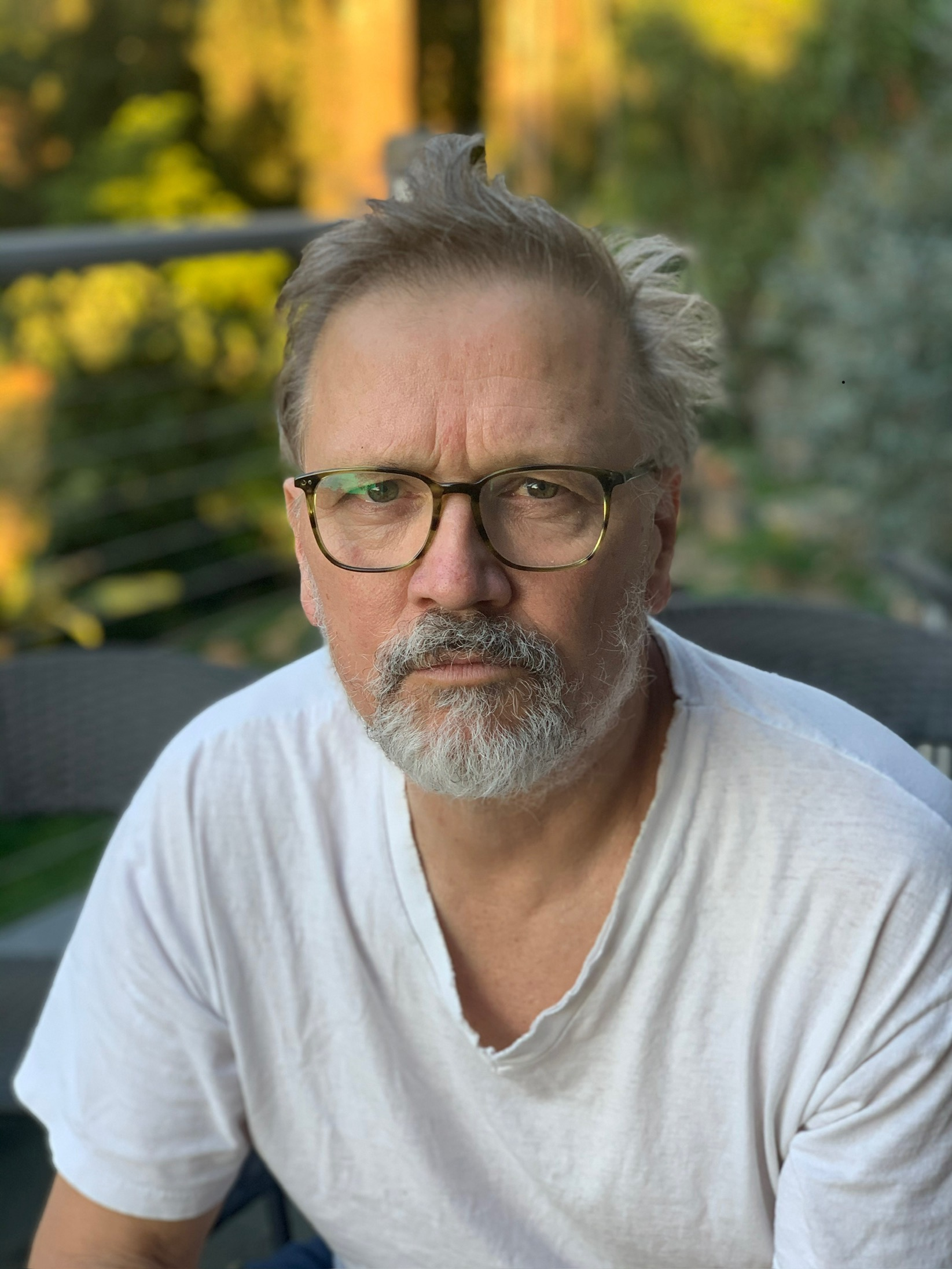
- Born: January 11, 1961 (age 65); Cleveland, Ohio
- Education: Cleveland Heights High School
- Known for: Design curation
- Website: https://thewindowla.com/

Gregory Thomas Wooten (born January 11, 1961) is an American design entrepreneur, collector and musician based in Los Angeles, California. He is the co-owner, with Lorca Cohen, of The Window, a Los Angeles-based design store.

== Early life and education ==
Wooten was born at the Scott Air Force Base, Shiloh Valley, Illinois. His mother, Audrey Wooten, was a homemaker and his father James Wooten was an independent contractor. James Wooten was active in the parody religion, Church of the Subgenius, where he was known as "Pope" Jimbo. Wooten graduated Cleveland Heights High School in 1978 and began working as a musician.

== Career ==
=== Design ===
While on a trip to New York, Wooten went to the Brooklyn Museum, where he saw "The Machine Age in America" exhibition. Upon returning to Cleveland, Wooten began to cultivate his talent as a design purveyor, buying Mid-Century Modern and Art Deco objects and furniture, eventually pivoting to selling privately to local dealers. He also began exhibiting at out-of-town design fairs and flea markets.

Wooten moved to New York City in 1996. He got his first job as manager of Mood Indigo in Soho. In 2000, Wooten opened his first design gallery, Mondo Cane with his then-partner Patrick Parrish in Chelsea. In 2005 Mondo Cane moved to Tribeca into a space designed by architect William Massie. Massie would later design Wooten's home, which was christened "The Skull," located in the Hudson Valley, New York. Mondo Cane carried furniture and objects designed by Harvey Pobber, Charles Eames, Robert Loughlin and RO/LU, amongst many other notable artists.

In 2011, Wooten moved to Los Angeles where he became the co-owner, with Lorca Cohen, of The Window. In 2015, he formed Billings Auction a modern design auction house located in the Arts District in downtown Los Angeles with Rich Carmichael, Josh Kritzer, and Lorca Cohen.

=== Music ===
Wooten has played bass in a variety of bands, using the moniker "Greg Thomas": Grendel, The Notion, Boy Wonder, Jewel of The Deep and Slam Bamboo with bandmate Trent Reznor. Slam Bamboo were together from 1984 through 1988. They released two 45's, 1987's House on Fire and 1988's White Lies on Slack Records. They opened for Billy Idol, Jefferson Starship, INXS, the Bangles, Modern English. After Slam Bamboo spilt, for the next six years, Wooten focused on being a session musician who toured with Michael Stanley & Friends, Kevin Raleigh, Humble Pie.

In 2015, Wooten began deejaying around Los Angeles, under the name "Uncle Power."

Blue Arrow Records have released three of Wooten's current band 1X4X9 LPs, beginning with "Leaving" in 2022, "Behind the Tree" in 2023 and "Residue" in 2024. Musicians who have participated in 1X4X9 include Andy Kubiszewski, Sean Beaven, John Papa, Rocoo DeLuca, Carlos Nino, Tim Kirker, Patrick Shiroishi, Michael Kanon and Sam Phipps of Oingo Boingo on saxophone.

=== Books ===
In 2019, J&L Books released Wooten's first book, Marred For Life!: Defaced Record Covers from the Collection of Gregory Wooten, which contains 250 vintage album covers that are defaced. "When I first started, I was such a purist. The record had to be organically found. I had to find it in the bins. I couldn’t know the artist. Through the years it would soften and I would get turned on to an artist, who had done something on a cover. I expanded the vision to any cover that had been altered," Wooten told the Cleveland Scene about the project.
