= Sejong Cyber University =

South Korean private virtual university

- Type: Private virtual university
- Established: March 1, 2001; 25 years ago
- Parent institution: Daeyang Educational Foundation
- President: Shin Gu (신구)
- Location: 121 Gunja-ro, Gwangjin-gu, Seoul, South Korea
- Website: http://home.sjcu.ac.kr/

Korean name
- Hangul: 세종사이버대학교
- Hanja: 世宗사이버大學校
- RR: Sejong saibeo daehakgyo
- MR: Sejong saibŏ taehakkyo

Sejong Cyber University (Korean: 세종사이버대학교) is a private virtual university in South Korea, founded in 2001.

== History ==
Sejong Cyber University was established in 2001 after receiving authorization from the Ministry of Education and Human Resources Development on November 30, 2000. In 2008, it was reorganized as a degree-granting institution under the Higher Education Act, and in October 2011, it received approval to establish a graduate school, enabling it to offer graduate degree programs.

The university is operated by the Daeyang Educational Foundation. As of 2026, its president is Shin Gu.

== Academic organization ==
Sejong Cyber University is composed of 12 schools (divisions) and 38 departments, offering a wide range of majors in the fields of humanities, social sciences, business, information technology, artificial intelligence, arts and culture, and public safety.

School / Division	Departments
School of International Studies	Department of International Studies (English & Chinese), Department of Korean Language
School of Business Administration	Department of Business Administration, Department of Distribution and Logistics, Department of Taxation, Accounting and Finance, Department of Food Service Entrepreneurship and Franchise Management, Department of Online Marketing, Department of Fashion and Beauty Management
School of Creative Content	Department of Creative Writing, Department of YouTube Studies, Department of Cartoon and Animation, Department of Applied Music, Department of Craft and Design
School of Real Estate, Architecture and Construction	Department of Real Estate, Department of Real Estate Auction and Brokerage, Department of Architecture, Urban Planning and Interior Design, Department of Environmental Landscape Architecture
School of Counseling and Psychology	Department of Counseling Psychology, Department of Art Therapy
School of Hotel and Tourism Management	Department of Hotel and Tourism Management, Department of Culinary and Service Management, Department of Barista and Sommelier Studies
School of Child and Family Studies	Department of Child Studies, Department of Family Welfare and Counseling
School of Social Welfare	Department of Social Welfare, Department of Social Welfare Administration
School of Information Technology (IT)	Department of Software Engineering, Department of Computer and AI Engineering, Department of Information Security
School of Artificial Intelligence (AI)	Department of Artificial Intelligence, Department of AI Practical Applications, Department of AI Creative Studies
School of Engineering	Department of Mechanical Engineering, Department of Drone and Robotics Convergence, Department of Electrical and Electronic Engineering
School of Disaster and Safety	Department of Fire and Disaster Prevention, Department of Fire Administration, Department of Industrial Safety Engineering, Department of Police Studies, Department of Defense Convergence

== Notable alumni ==
- Flash (gamer)
- Jeong Se-woon
- Seola (singer)
- Umji
- Yoo Seung-woo

== See also ==
- Sejong University
- Sejong University Station
