= Online degree =

Type of academic degree

An online degree is an academic degree (usually a college degree, but sometimes the term includes high school diplomas and non-degree certificate programs) that can be earned primarily or entirely through the use of an Internet-connected computer, rather than attending college in a traditional campus setting. Improvements in technology, the increasing use of the Internet worldwide, and the need for people to have flexible school schedules while they are working have led to a proliferation of online colleges that award associate, bachelor's, master's, and doctoral degrees.

== Accreditation ==
The goal of educational accreditation, according to the United States Department of Education, is to ensure that programs provided by institutions of higher education meet acceptable levels of quality. ENQA, the European Association for Quality Assurance in Higher Education, describes the role of external quality assurance in education as one that "combines both accountability for the reassurance of the public and an objective and developmental role for enhancing quality in institutions." In the area of online education, it is important to avoid unaccredited diploma mills that offer fake degrees, as these are unfortunately common. Students seeking valid online degrees should obtain proof of accreditation from an appropriate national or regional accrediting body.

In the United States, online colleges that are fully accredited have earned a widely recognized form of university accreditation from either one of the six regional accreditation boards, one of the six national accreditation boards, or one of the four national faith-based accreditation boards. Each of six geographic regions of the United States has one regional accreditation board, a non-governmental agency that oversees and accredits degree-granting institutions headquartered in their areas.

Outside of the United States, other national and regional standards of accreditation hold, and may be highly supportive of, distance education. For example, the Universitat Oberta de Catalunya, or Open University of Catalonia, has been accredited by AQU, the Agency for Quality Assurance in the Catalan University System (a full member of ENQA), since its inception in 1995, and has been called a "significant success story" as "the world's first continuous, and sustainable, virtual university." Similarly, in Ireland, the Higher Education and Training Awards Council (HETAC) has accredited a number of online colleges and degrees (e.g., Setanta College).

== Quality ==
Online education enables individuals living with physical disabilities, full-time employees, military personnel, those living abroad, and stay-at-home parents, among others, to have access to accredited higher education.

The perception of the quality of online degrees compared to on-campus degrees varies, but has been increasing in recent years. While most major online colleges are regionally accredited, the public estimation of their quality is in dispute. A national survey of hiring representatives showed that a preference toward on-campus degrees exists. In some instances, hiring executives were unwilling to consider applicants with an online degree. Some experts argue that degrees in certain fields are more accepted online than in others, while some programs are less suited for online-only schools. A major issue for accredited and reputable online programs is the proliferation of proprietary online-only programs that have come under fire in recent years.

A survey by the Distance Education Accrediting Commission (DEAC) found that 100% of employers who responded felt that distance education program graduates performed better on the job as a result of their degree (as compared to their previous performance). Additionally, employers felt that an employee receiving a distance education degree compared favorably, in terms of knowledge learned, to someone with a resident degree. On the other hand, The Chronicle of Higher Education reported in January 2007 on a Vault Inc. survey that found 55 percent of employers preferred traditional degrees over online ones. Forty-one percent, however, said they would give "equal consideration to both types of degrees."

The Sloan Consortium, an organization funded by the Alfred P. Sloan Foundation to maintain and improve the quality of distance education, publishes regular reports on the state of United States distance education. In its 2006 report "Making the Grade: Online Education in the United States, 2006," it stated that "in 2003, 57 percent of academic leaders rated the learning outcomes in online education as the same or superior to those in face-to-face. That number is now 62 percent, a small but noteworthy increase."

According to Steve Lohr's article in the New York Times, a major study was done in 2009 that was funded by the Education Department. The collected research was from a 12-year period and concluded that online learning on average beat face-to-face teaching by a small but statistical margin.

In many cases, an online degree earned through an accredited public or private university may be effectively indistinguishable from a degree earned in a campus-based program, the latter sometimes referred to as "brick-and-mortar" programs. The instruction is often exactly the same, with the online degree containing no special designation. As such the same financial aid packages are often available to online students, which has helped make them more accessible to traditional applicants. An example of an indistinguishable degree program is that offered by Columbia University. Students who earn a degree through the Columbia Video Network (CVN) earn exactly the same type of degree as the campus-based program. The professors, courses, homework, tests, and eventual transcripts and diploma are identical to that of on-campus students. Another example is NYU Tandon Online which offers master's degrees completely online through New York University Tandon School of Engineering.

In recent years many top universities have been actively expanding their extension and online learning programs in an effort to legitimize the online education arena. While admissions to online programs at prestigious universities hasn't seen a dramatic spike, there has been a large expansion in course offerings in recent years. Almost all Ivy League and top 20 universities now offer at least one online graduate degree program or certification.

== Prevalence of online education ==
The National Center for Education Statistics (NCES) conducted a distance education study based on the 2001-2002 academic year at United States 2-year and 4-year degree-granting institutions that were eligible for U.S. federal student aid. The study reported that 56 percent of institutions surveyed offered distance education courses. The study also found that public institutions were more likely to offer distance education than private institutions were.

The Sloan Consortium, based on data collected from over 2,200 U.S. colleges and universities, reports that nearly 3.2 million students took at least one online course during 2005 (a significant increase over the 2.3 million reported in 2004). According to the same report, about two-thirds of the largest institutions have fully online programs. In 2010, more than 6 million students were taking at least one course online. As of 2013, the number of students enrolled in online courses had risen to over 6.7 million.

According to Steve Lohr's article in the New York Times, a major study was done in 2009 that was funded by the Education Department. The collected research was from a 12-year period and concluded that online learning on average beat face-to-face teaching by a small but statistical margin.

== Financial aid ==
Until 2006, United States students enrolled in online degree programs were not eligible for federal student aid unless at least half of their programs were campus-based (a law established in 1992 and known as the 50-percent rule). In February 2006, that law was repealed, making federal student aid in the form of federal loans, grants, and work-study available in the U.S. for students enrolled in an eligible online degree program at an accredited Title IV-eligible institution.

== See also ==
- Virtual university
- Distance learning
