= Wedemeyer =

Wedemeyer is a surname. Notable people with the surname include:

- Albert Coady Wedemeyer (1896–1989), U.S. general in World War II
- Charles Wedemeyer (1911–1999), American pioneer of distance and independent learning
- Charlie Wedemeyer (1946–2010), American teacher and football coach
- Christian K. Wedemeyer (born 1969), American professor and Illinois politician
- Clemens von Wedemeyer (born 1974), German video artist
- Haimar Wedemeyer (1906–1998), German sailor
- Herman Wedemeyer (1924–1999), American actor, football player, and politician
- Joelle Wedemeyer (born 1996), German footballer
- Maria von Wedemeyer Weller (1924–1977), German-American computer scientist
- Ted E. Wedemeyer Jr. (1932–2008), American lawyer and judge
- William Wedemeyer (1873–1913), U.S. politician

== See also ==
- Wedemeyer Rocks, a group of rocks in Antarctica
- Joseph Weydemeyer, a German-American colonel in the Union Army and correspondent of Karl marx
