= NYU Tandon Digital Learning =

Coordinates: 40.694412°N 73.986531°W

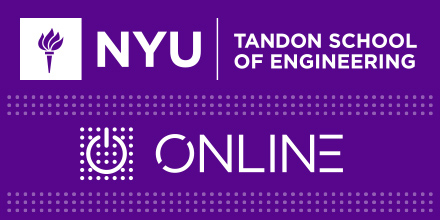
- Established: 2006
- Type: Private
- Dean: Jelena Kovačević
- Dept. Head: Nasir Memon
- City: Brooklyn
- State: New York
- Location: Online
- Affiliations: NYU Tandon School of Engineering; New York University
- Website: online.engineering.nyu.edu

NYU Tandon Digital Learning, formerly known as NYU Tandon Online and NYU-ePoly, is the digital learning department at New York University Tandon School of Engineering, a noted school of engineering, technology, management and applied sciences in the United States.

Currently, the School of Engineering offers a range of graduate-level programs online, including four master's degrees and an advanced certificate. Nasir Memon joined the department as its head in 2017 and introduced the unit's first non-credit course offering, A Bridge to Tandon (now named NYU Tandon Bridge), an innovative, online course to prepare non-STEM students for graduate engineering studies. NYU Tandon Digital Learning's master's degree programs offer the same curriculum and credentials as their on-campus counterparts and benefit from an active learning approach that engages students in interactive, high-quality learning modules paired with the university and school's time-honored pedagogical approaches. The platform has been recognized by the Alfred P. Sloan Foundation, Online Learning Consortium & by U.S. News & World Report.

== History ==
NYU Tandon Digital Learning's story began back in 2006 as “e-Poly,” the online learning wing of the then Polytechnic University. The department was initially designed to enable its on-campus students to blend and accelerate their time to degree completion by taking some courses online. The first program offered entirely online was the Cybersecurity master's degree, which is still the leading program by enrollment. By 2009, e-Poly program offerings included three master's degrees and two advanced certificates. In 2009, e-Poly was renamed NYU-ePoly, in recognition of the university's affiliation with NYU. Following the school's name change in October 2015, the department was renamed NYU Tandon Online. Today NYU Tandon Online offers over 65 NYU-developed online courses in diverse technology and management fields.

== Academics ==
=== Programs ===
NYU Tandon Digital Learning offers online graduate programs developed, designed and delivered in conjunction with various departments at NYU Tandon School of Engineering, including Cybersecurity, Bioinformatics, Emerging Technologies, and Management of Technology, offering the same curriculum and approach as their on-campus counterparts, entirely online. In addition to the master's programs, advanced certificate programs, non-credit professional education courses, and the NYU Tandon Bridge pathway program are offered.

=== Non-credit Programs ===
NYU Tandon Digital Learning launched its first non-credit offering in 2016. The NYU Tandon Bridge program, a computer science and STEM "bridge" for non-computer scientists, provides, for total tuition of $1850, three traditional courses that, upon successful completion, qualify students to apply for the Computer Science, Cybersecurity, Bioinformatics, or Computer Engineering master's degree programs at NYU Tandon and an array of accepting partner institutions.

=== Visiting Students ===
Apart from the regular master's and certificate programs, NYU Tandon Online also allows individuals to take up to nine credits at NYU Tandon School of Engineering, without completing formal admission. This option is especially beneficial for students who want to learn an advanced topic for personal and professional development or who wish to experience a master's program before fully committing.

=== NYU Cyber Fellows ===
A distinctive offering of NYU Tandon Digital Learning is its NYU Cyber Fellows program which provides a 75% scholarship towards tuition for all students admitted to this online Cybersecurity master's degree. Offered for $18,000, NYU Cyber Fellows is a part-time or full-time program of 10 courses designed to be completed in 2–3 years, entirely online. Access to a hands-on virtual lab, industry collaborations, an industry-reviewed curriculum, exclusive speaker events, and peer mentors are also offered. Following graduation, students are given access to updated course materials for 5 years.

In 2021 the application for this program was streamlined to take as little as 15 minutes to complete. In addition, applicants receive an admission decision in 15 business days.

== Accreditation ==
NYU Tandon School of Engineering is accredited by the Middle States Commission on Higher Education and New York State Education Department to award master's and graduate certificate degrees.

== Affiliations ==
NYU Tandon Digital Learning is associated with many corporations, societies and companies. NYU Tandon Online is also associated with the National Security Agency through their National Centers of Academic Excellence in Cyber Operations Program. Under the direction of NYU Enterprise Learning, the unit partnered with Scientific American to provide interactive short courses called Professional Learning.

== Rankings ==
- 34th Best Online Graduate Computer Information Technology Program by U.S. News & World Report in 2023.
- 72nd Best Online Graduate Engineering Program by U.S. News & World Report in 2023.
- 4th The 30 Most technologically Savvy online Schools by Online Schools Center for 2015.

== Awards ==
- Sloan-C named the online Cybersecurity Master's program as the Nation's "Outstanding Online Program" in 2011.
- Received the Ralph E. Gomory Award for Quality Online Education from the Online Learning Consortium (formerly known as Sloan-C) in 2015.

== See also ==
- New York University Tandon School of Engineering
- NYU
- Online Learning Consortium
- Online degree
- Distance education
- Virtual university
