= Distance education =

Mode of delivering education to students who are not physically present

Distance education, also known as distance learning, is the education of students who may not always be physically present at school, or where the learner and the teacher are separated in both time and distance; today, it usually involves online education (also known as online learning, remote learning or remote education) through an online school. A distance learning program can either be completely online, or a combination of both online and traditional in-person (also known as, offline) classroom instruction (called hybrid or blended).

Massive open online courses (MOOCs), offering large-scale interactive participation and open access through the World Wide Web or other network technologies, are recent educational modes in distance education. A number of other terms (distributed learning, e-learning, m-learning, virtual classroom, etc.) are used roughly synonymously with distance education. E-learning has shown to be a useful educational tool. E-learning should be an interactive process with multiple learning modes for all learners at various levels of learning. The distance learning environment is an exciting place to learn new things, collaborate with others, and retain self-discipline.

Historically, it involved correspondence courses wherein the student corresponded with the school via mail, but with the evolution of different technologies it has evolved to include video conferencing, TV, and the Internet.

== History ==
One of the earliest attempts at distance education was advertised in 1728. This was in the Boston Gazette for "Caleb Philipps, Teacher of the new method of Short Hand", who sought students who wanted to learn the skills through weekly mailed lessons.

The first distance education course in the modern sense was provided by Sir Isaac Pitman in the 1840s who taught a system of shorthand by mailing texts transcribed into shorthand on postcards and receiving transcriptions from his students in return for correction. The element of student feedback was a crucial innovation in Pitman's system. The postage stamp made this scheme for remote education possible, and these efforts were scalable because of the introduction of uniform postage rates across England in 1840.

This early beginning proved extremely successful and the Phonographic Correspondence Society was founded three years later to establish these courses on a more formal basis. The society paved the way for the later formation of Sir Isaac Pitman Colleges across the country.

The first correspondence school in the United States was the Society to Encourage Studies at Home which was founded in 1873.

Founded in 1894, Wolsey Hall, Oxford was the first distance-learning college in the UK.

=== University correspondence courses ===
==== United Kingdom ====
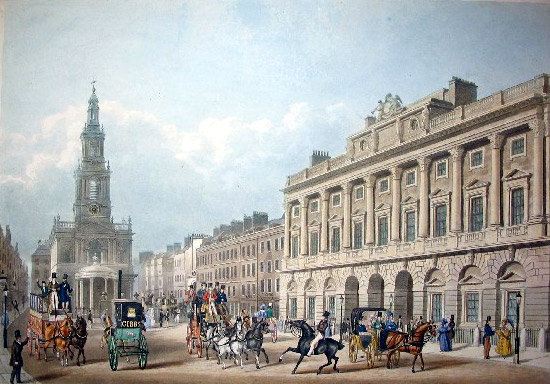
Somerset House, home of the University of London from 1837 to 1870

The University of London was the first university to offer degrees to anyone who could pass their examinations, establishing its External Programme in 1858. It had been established in 1836 as an examining and degree-awarding body for affiliated colleges, originally University College London and King's College London but with many others added over the next two decades. The affiliated colleges provided certificates that the student had attended a course. A new charter in 1858 removed this requirement, allowing men (and women from 1878) taking instruction at any institution or pursuing a course of self-directed study to sit the examinations and receive degrees. The External Programme was referred to as the "People's University" by Charles Dickens as it provided access to higher education to students from less affluent backgrounds. Enrollment increased steadily during the late 19th century, and its example was widely copied elsewhere. However, the university only provided examinations, not instructional material, leading academics to state that "the original degree by external study of the UOL was not a form of distance education".

The External Programme is now known as the University of London Worldwide, and includes postgraduate and undergraduate degrees created by member institutions of the University of London.

==== Australia and South Africa ====
The vast distances made Australia especially active; the University of Queensland established its Department of Correspondence Studies in 1911.

==== United States ====
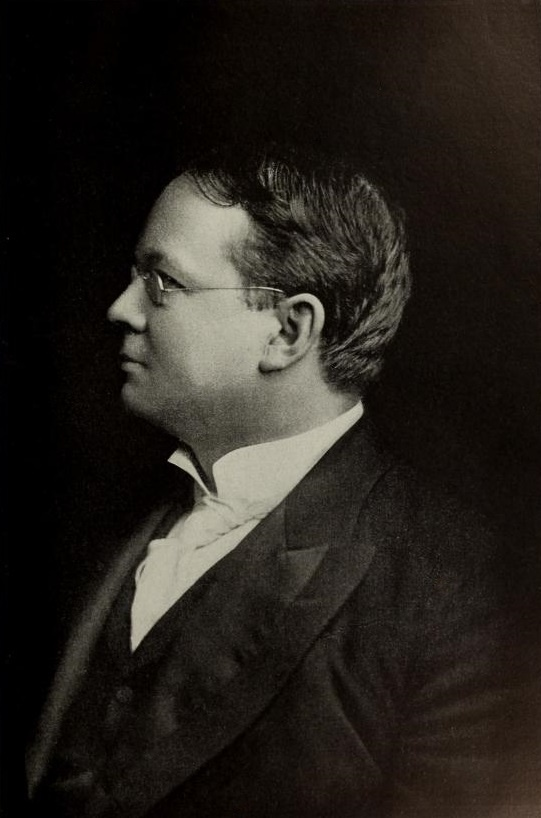
William Rainey Harper, proponent of external university courses, pictured here in 1905

William Rainey Harper, founder and first president of the University of Chicago, celebrated the concept of extended education, where a research university had satellite colleges elsewhere in the region.

In 1892, Harper encouraged correspondence courses to further promote education, an idea that was put into practice by the University of Chicago, the University of Wisconsin, Columbia University, and several dozen other universities by the 1920s. Enrollment in the largest private for-profit school based in Scranton, Pennsylvania, the International Correspondence Schools grew explosively in the 1890s. Founded in 1888 to provide training for immigrant coal miners aiming to become state mine inspectors or foremen, it enrolled 2500 new students in 1894 and matriculated 72,000 new students in 1895. By 1906 total enrollments reached 900,000. The growth was due to sending out complete textbooks instead of single lessons, and the use of 1200 aggressive in-person salesmen. There was a stark contrast in pedagogy:

The regular technical school or college aims to educate a man broadly; our aim, on the contrary, is to educate him only along some particular line. The college demands that a student shall have certain educational qualifications to enter it and that all students study for approximately the same length of time; when they have finished their courses they are supposed to be qualified to enter any one of a number of branches in some particular profession. We, on the contrary, are aiming to make our courses fit the particular needs of the student who takes them.

Education was a high priority in the Progressive Era, as American high schools and colleges expanded greatly. For men who were older or were too busy with family responsibilities, night schools were opened, such as the YMCA school in Boston that became Northeastern University. Private correspondence schools outside of the major cities provided a flexible, focused solution. Large corporations systematized their training programs for new employees. The National Association of Corporation Schools grew from 37 in 1913 to 146 in 1920. Private schools that provided specialized technical training to everyone who enrolled, not just employees of one company, began to open across the nation in the 1880s. Starting in Milwaukee in 1907, public schools began opening free vocational program.

==== International Conference ====
The International Conference for Correspondence Education held its first meeting in 1938. The goal was to provide individualized education for students, at low cost, by using a pedagogy of testing, recording, classification, and differentiation. Since then, the group has changed its name to the International Council for Open and Distance Education (ICDE), with its main office in Oslo, Norway.

=== Open universities ===
The Open University (OU) in the United Kingdom was founded by the then Labour government led by Harold Wilson. Based on the vision of Michael Young, planning commenced in 1965 under the Minister of State for Education, Jennie Lee, who established a model for the Open University as one of widening access to the highest standards of scholarship in higher education and setting up a planning committee consisting of university vice-chancellors, educationalists, and television broadcasters, chaired by Sir Peter Venables. The British Broadcasting Corporation's (BBC) Assistant Director of Engineering at the time, James Redmond, had obtained most of his qualifications at night school, and his natural enthusiasm for the project did much to overcome the technical difficulties of using television to broadcast teaching programs.

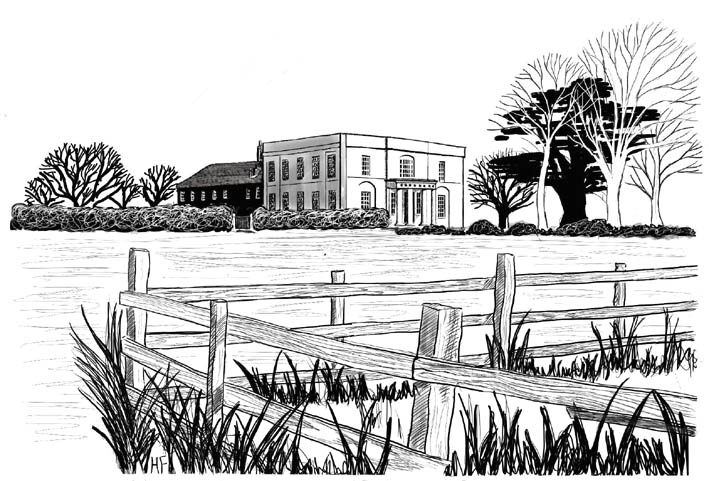
Walton Hall, renovated in 1970 to act as the headquarters of the newly established Open University (artist: Hilary French)

The Open University revolutionized the scope of the correspondence program and helped to create a respectable learning alternative to the traditional form of education. It has been at the forefront of developing new technologies to improve distance learning service as well as undertaking research in other disciplines. Walter Perry was appointed the OU's first vice-chancellor in January 1969, and its foundation secretary was Anastasios Christodoulou. The election of the new Conservative government under the leadership of Edward Heath in 1970 led to budget cuts under Chancellor of the Exchequer Iain Macleod (who had earlier called the idea of an Open University "blithering nonsense"). However, the OU accepted its first 25,000 students in 1971, adopting a radical open admissions policy. At the time, the total student population of conventional universities in the United Kingdom was around 130,000.

Athabasca University, Canada's open university, was created in 1970 and followed a similar, though independently developed, pattern. The Open University inspired the creation of Spain's National University of Distance Education (1972) and Germany's University of Hagen (1974). There are now many similar institutions around the world, often with the name "Open University", as in Italy (in English or in the local language).

Most open universities use distance education technologies as delivery methods, though some require attendance at local study centers or at regional "summer schools". Some open universities have grown to become mega-universities.

=== COVID-19 pandemic ===
Distance lessons over video conferences in the world during the COVID-19 pandemic ...

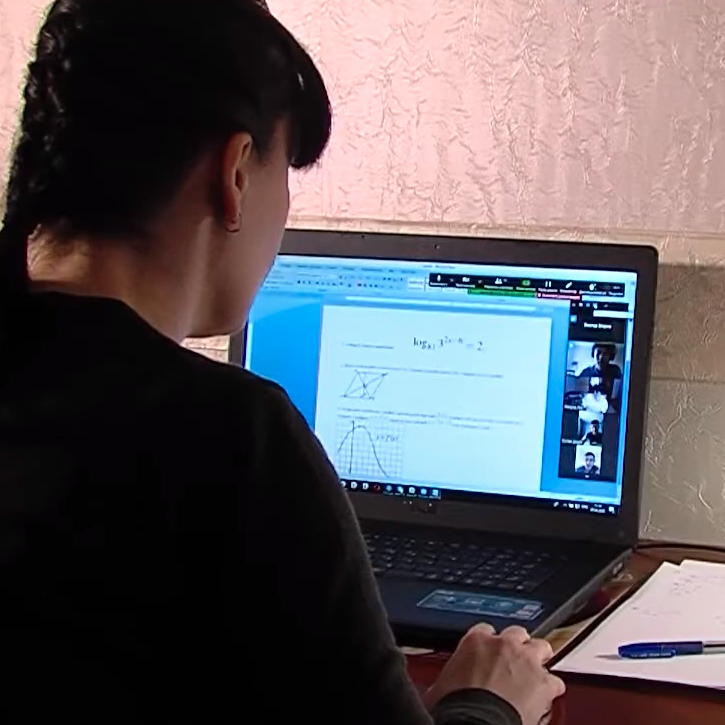
... in Russia

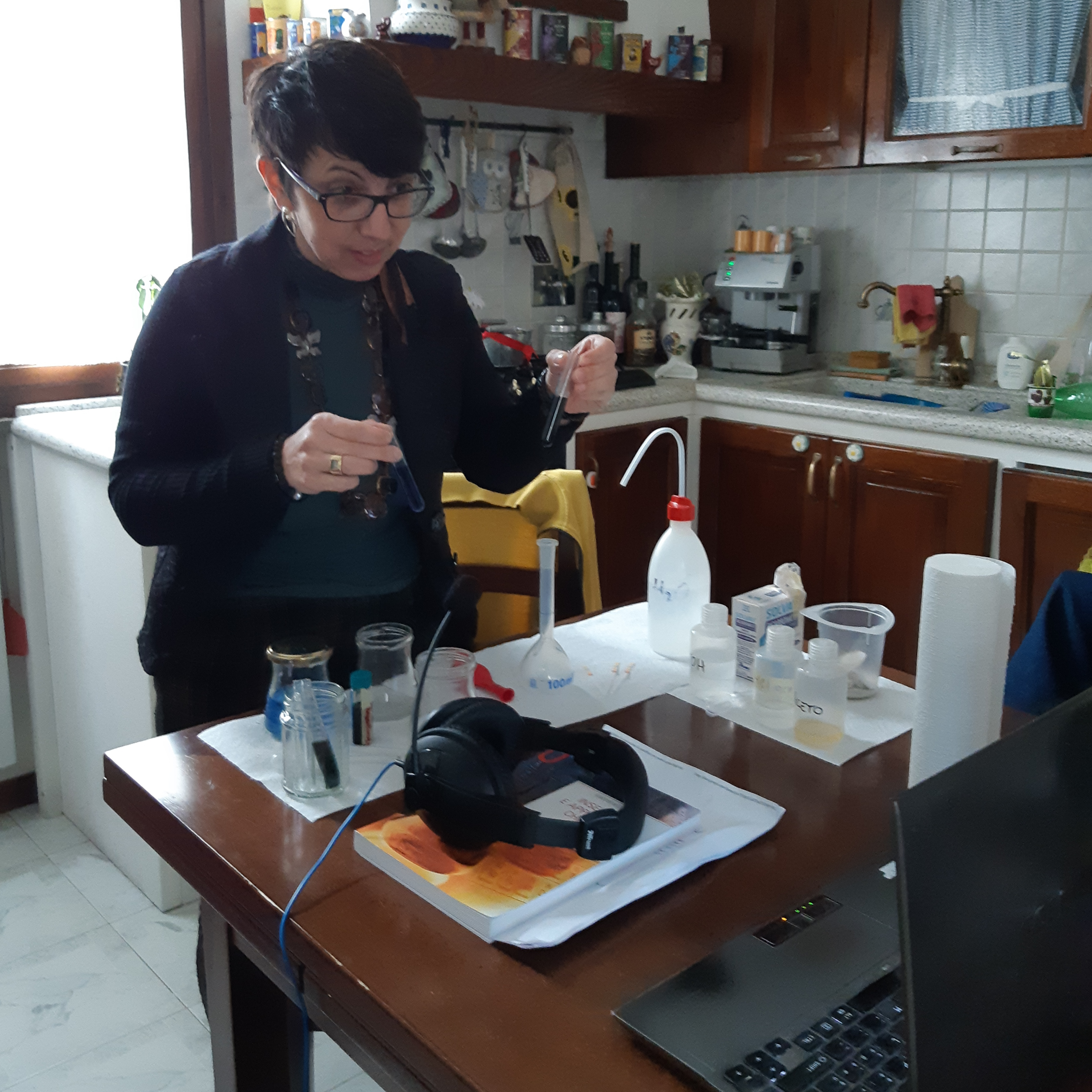
... in Italy

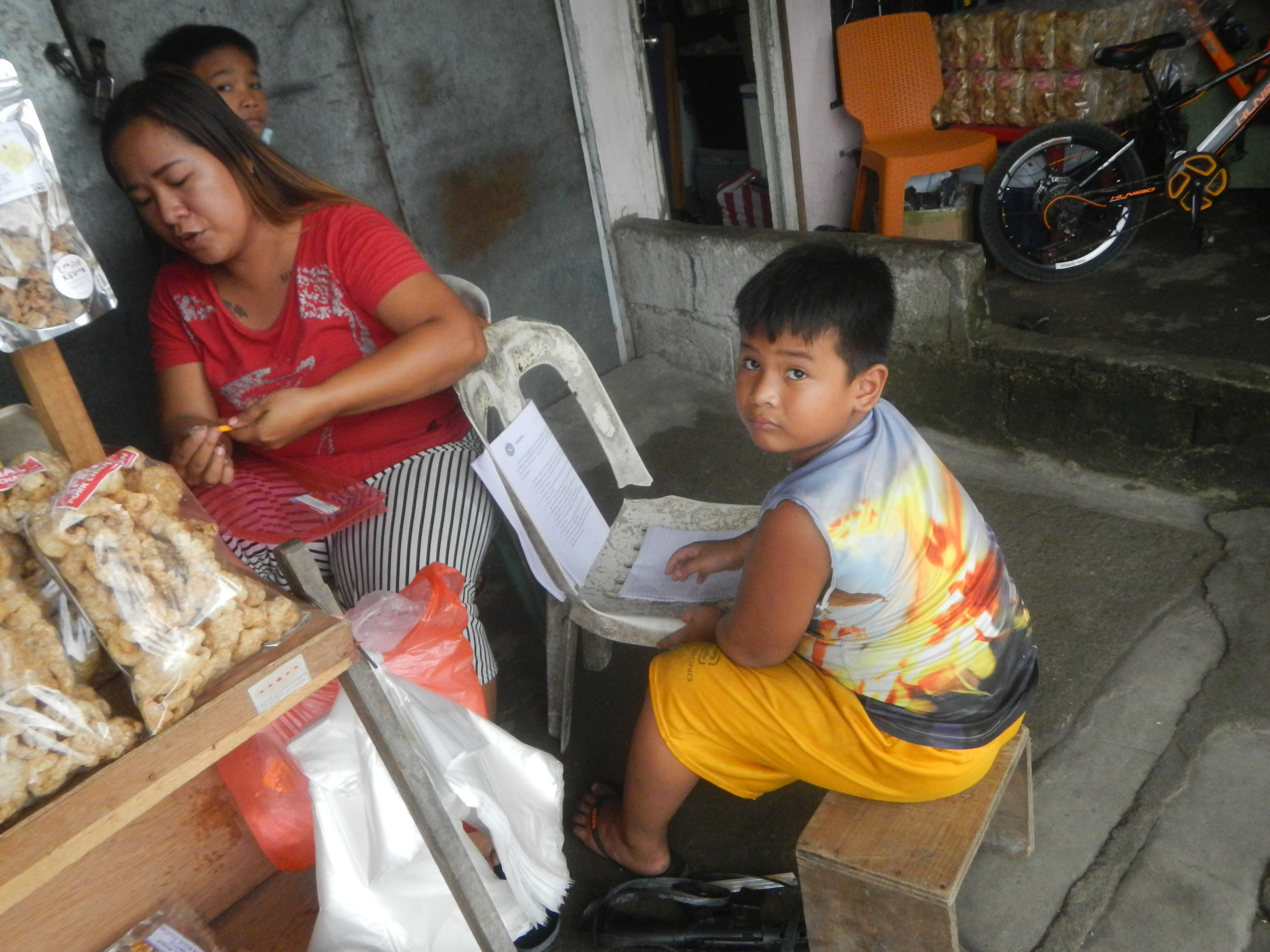
Filipino homeschooling students – blended (printed-digital modular) distance learning with self-learning materials during the 2020 COVID-19 pandemic in San Miguel, Bulacan

The COVID-19 pandemic resulted in the closure of the vast majority of schools worldwide for in-person learning. The pandemic also exposed gaps in teachers' preparedness to use digital pedagogy effectively, including challenges with interactive instructional design and unfamiliarity with platforms such as Zoom and Teams. COVID-19 increased the value of distance education although its policies were implemented and formulated among several universities much earlier. Many schools moved to online remote learning through platforms including—but not limited to—Zoom, Blackboard, Cisco Webex, Google Meet, Microsoft Teams, Skype, D2L, GoTo Meeting and Edgenuity. A recent study showed that Google Classroom was the most used platform by students followed by Microsoft Teams and Zoom, respectively. The less-used platforms included Blackboard Learn, DingTalk, Tencent, and WhatsApp. However, the most preferred platforms by students were Microsoft Teams followed by Google Classroom and Zoom. Although Google Classroom was the most used by students as decided by their lectures, Microsoft Teams was the most preferred by those students.

Concerns arose over the impact of this transition on students without access to an internet-enabled device or a stable internet connection. Distanced education during the COVID-19 pandemic has interrupted synchronous learning for many students and teachers; where educators were no longer able to teach in real-time and could only switch to asynchronous instruction, this significantly and negatively affected their coping with the transition, and posed various legal issues, especially in terms of copyright. The physical surroundings during the COVID-19 pandemic are seen by university instructors as having a detrimental effect on the quality of distance education. However, where the lecture is delivered and the type of faculty do not show any significant statistical variances in the quality of distance education. The shift away from real-time instruction to asynchronous learning modes has posed significant challenges, impacting both the teaching and learning experience. Educators, grappling with this abrupt transition, have faced hurdles in effectively engaging students and delivering course content, leading to heightened stress and burnout among faculty members. Additionally, this shift has raised legal concerns, particularly regarding copyright issues related to the dissemination of educational materials in digital formats. Post-COVID-19 pandemic, while some educational institutions went back to physical classes, others switched to blended learning or kept up their online distance learning. A randomized controlled trial across 1,151 schools and 45,000 students in Ecuador found that centralized monitoring of an online learning management system increased student participation by 0.21 standard deviations and subject knowledge by 0.13 standard deviations relative to decentralized management. In contrast, teacher nudges and student encouragement messages had no significant effect.

A recent study about the benefits and drawbacks of online learning found that students have had a harder time producing their own work. The study suggests teachers should cut back on the amount of information taught and incorporate more activities during the lesson, in order for students to create their own work. Though schools are slow to adapt to new technologies, COVID-19 required schools to adapt and learn how to use new digital and online learning tools. Web conferencing has become more popular since 2007. Researchers have found that people in online classes perform just as effectively as participants in conventional learning classes. The use of online learning is becoming a pathway for learners with sparse access to physical courses so they can complete their degrees. Furthermore, digital classroom technologies allow those living remotely to access learning, and it enables the student to fit learning into their schedule more easily.

== Technologies ==
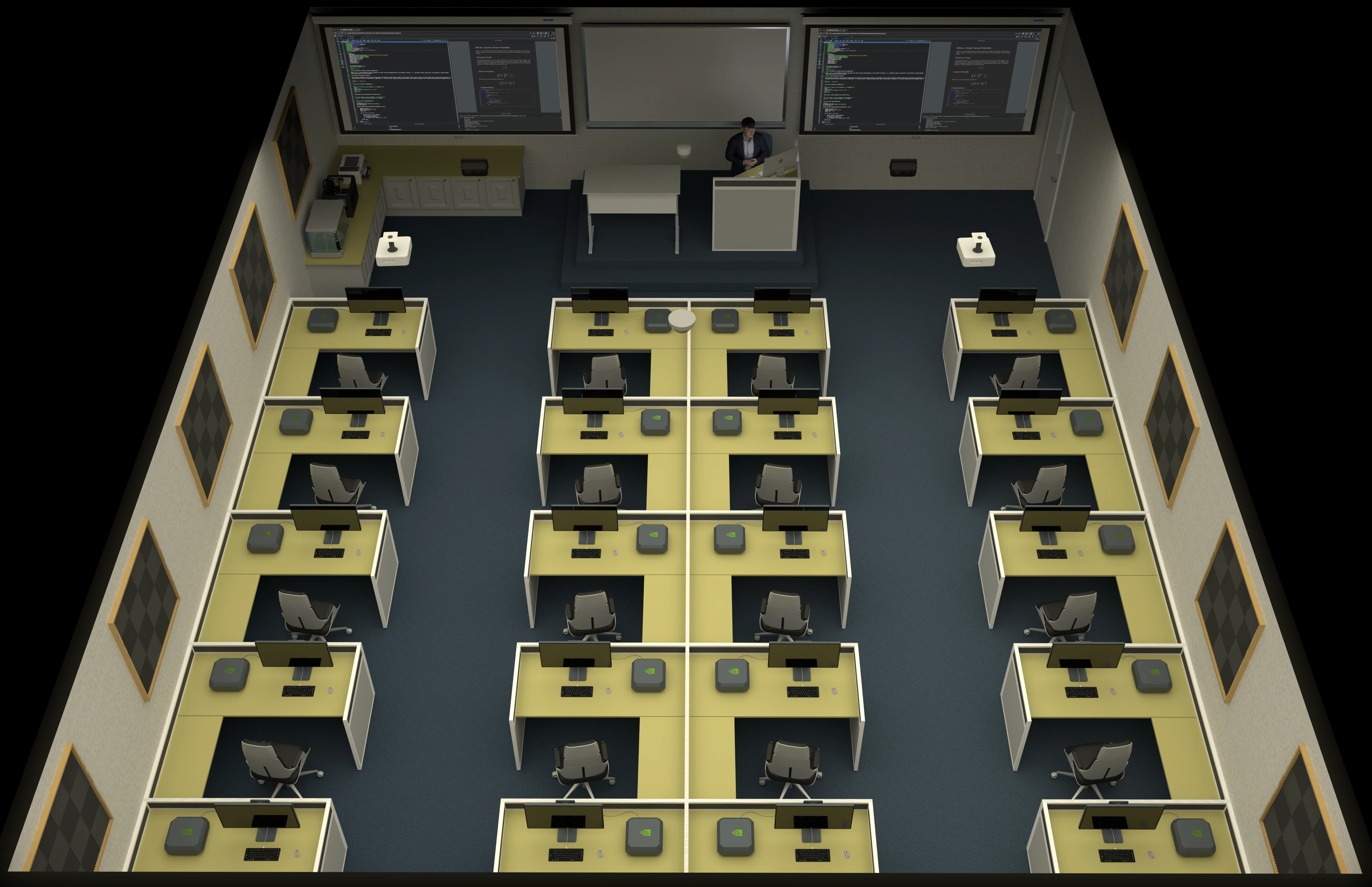
3D design of cubicle desks to get computers to the desk for a computational education

In synchronous learning, all participants are "present" at the same time in a virtual classroom, as in traditional classroom teaching. It requires a timetable. Web conferencing, videoconferencing, educational television, and instructional television are examples of synchronous technology, as are direct-broadcast satellite (DBS), internet radio, live streaming, telephone, and web-based VoIP. However, many learners face barriers due to lack of stable internet connections or access to devices, highlighting a serious equity issue in digital access.

Web conferencing software helps to facilitate class meetings, and usually contains additional interaction tools such as text chat, polls, hand raising, emoticons etc. These tools also support asynchronous participation by students who can listen to recordings of synchronous sessions. Immersive environments (notably SecondLife) have also been used to enhance participant presence in distance education courses. Another form of synchronous learning using the classroom is the use of robot proxies including those that allow sick students to attend classes.

Some universities have been starting to use robot proxies to enable more engaging synchronous hybrid classes where both remote and in-person students can be present and interact using telerobotics devices such as the Kubi Telepresence robot stand that looks around and the Double Robot that roams around. With these telepresence robots, the remote students have a seat at the table or desk instead of being on a screen on the wall.

In asynchronous learning, participants access course materials flexibly on their schedules. Students are not required to be together at the same time. Mail correspondence, which is the oldest form of distance education, is an asynchronous delivery technology, as are message board forums, e-mail, video and audio recordings, print materials, voicemail, and fax.

The five characteristics of technological innovations (compatibility, observability, relative advantage, complexity, and trialability) have a significant positive relationship with the digital literacy of users. Besides, observability, trialability, and digital skill were found to have a positive significant influence on digital literacy.

The two methods can be combined. Many courses offered by both open universities and an increasing number of campus-based institutions use periodic sessions of residential or day teaching to supplement the sessions delivered at a distance. This type of mixed distance and campus-based education has recently come to be called "blended learning" or less often "hybrid learning". Many open universities use a blend of technologies and a blend of learning modalities (face-to-face, distance, and hybrid) all under the rubric of "distance learning".

Distance learning can also use interactive radio instruction (IRI), interactive audio instruction (IAI), online virtual worlds, digital games, webinars, and webcasts, all of which are referred to as e-Learning.

=== Radio and television ===
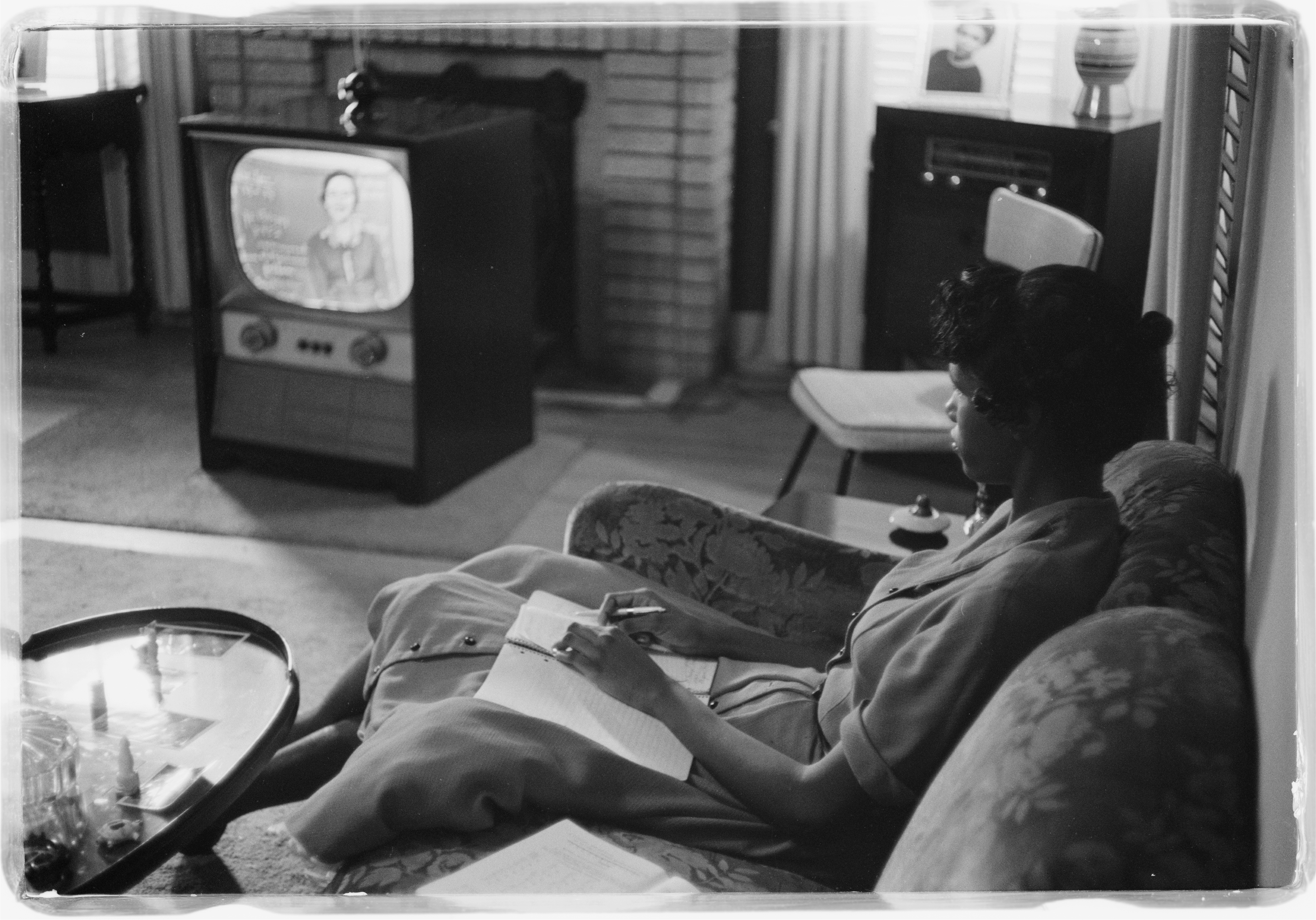
One of the Little Rock Nine watching high school classes on TV, as schools were physically shut down due to integration

External audio
- Air college talk., 2:45, 2 December 1931, WNYC

The rapid spread of film in the 1920s and radio in the 1930s led to proposals to use it for distance education. By 1938, at least 200 city school systems, 25 state boards of education, and many colleges and universities broadcast educational programs for public schools. One line of thought was to use radio as a master teacher.

Experts in given fields broadcast lessons for pupils within the many schoolrooms of the public school system, asking questions, suggesting readings, making assignments, and conducting tests. This mechanizes education and leaves the local teacher only the tasks of preparing for the broadcast and keeping order in the classroom.

The first large-scale implementation of radio for distance education took place in 1937 in Chicago. During a three-week school closure implemented in response to a polio outbreak that the city was experiencing, superintendent of Chicago Public Schools William Johnson and assistant superintendent Minnie Fallon implemented a program of distance learning that provided the city's elementary school students with instruction through radio broadcasts.

A typical setup came in Kentucky in 1948 when John Wilkinson Taylor, president of the University of Louisville, teamed up with NBC to use radio as a medium for distance education. The chairman of the Federal Communications Commission endorsed the project and predicted that the "college-by-radio" would put "American education 25 years ahead". The university was owned by the city, and local residents would pay the low tuition rates, receive their study materials in the mail, and listen by radio to live classroom discussions that were held on campus. Physicist Daniel Q. Posin also was a pioneer in the field of distance education when he hosted a televised course through DePaul University.

Charles Wedemeyer of the University of Wisconsin–Madison also promoted new methods. From 1964 to 1968, the Carnegie Foundation funded Wedemeyer's Articulated Instructional Media Project (AIM) which brought in a variety of communications technologies aimed at providing learning to an off-campus population. The radio courses faded away in the 1950s. Many efforts to use television along the same lines proved unsuccessful, despite heavy funding by the Ford Foundation.

=== Internet ===
The widespread use of computers and the Internet has made distance learning easier and faster, and today virtual schools and virtual universities deliver full curricula online.

The first online courses for graduate and undergraduate credit were offered in 1985 by Connected Education through The New School in New York City, with students earning the MA in Media Studies completely online via computer conferencing, with no in-person requirements. This was followed in 1986 by the University of Toronto through the Graduate School of Education (then called OISE: the Ontario Institute for Studies in Education), offering a course in "Women and Computers in Education", dealing with gender issues and educational computing. The first new and fully online university was founded in 1994 as the Open University of Catalonia, headquartered in Barcelona, Spain. In 1999 Jones International University was launched as the first fully online university accredited by a regional accrediting association in the US.

Between 2000 and 2008, enrollment in distance education courses increased rapidly almost every country in both developed and developing countries. Many private, public, non-profit, and for-profit institutions worldwide now offer distance education courses from the most basic instruction through to the highest levels of degree and doctoral programs. New York University and International University Canada, for example, offer online degrees in engineering and management-related fields through NYU Tandon Online. Levels of accreditation vary: widely respected universities such as Stanford University and Harvard now deliver online courses—but other online schools receive little outside oversight, and some are fraudulent, i.e., diploma mills. In the US, the Distance Education Accrediting Commission (DEAC) specializes in the accreditation of distance education institutions.

In the United States in 2011, it was found that a third of all the students enrolled in postsecondary education had taken an accredited online course in a postsecondary institution. Growth continued. In 2013 the majority of public and private colleges offered full academic programs online. Programs included training in the mental health, occupational therapy, family therapy, art therapy, physical therapy, and rehabilitation counseling fields.

By 2008, online learning programs were available in the United States in 44 states at the K-12 level.

Internet forums, online discussion groups, and online learning community can contribute to a distance education experience. Research shows that socialization plays an important role in some forms of distance education.

== Paced and self-paced models ==
Kaplan and Haenlein classify distance education into four groups according to "Time dependency" and "Number of participants":

1. MOOCs (Massive Open Online Courses): Open-access online course (i.e., without specific participation restrictions) that allows for unlimited (massive) participation;
2. SPOCs (Small Private Online Courses): Online course that only offers a limited number of places and therefore requires some form of formal enrollment;
3. SMOCs (Synchronous Massive Online Courses): Open-access online course that allows for unlimited participation but requires students to be "present" at the same time (synchronously);
4. SSOCs (Synchronous Private Online Courses): Online course that only offers a limited number of places and requires students to be "present" at the same time (synchronously).

Paced models are a familiar mode since they are used almost exclusively in campus-based schools. Institutes that offer both distance and campus programs usually use paced models so that teacher workload, student semester planning, tuition deadlines, exam schedules, and other administrative details can be synchronized with campus delivery. Student familiarity and the pressure of deadlines encourage students to readily adapt to and usually succeed in paced models. However, student freedom is sacrificed as a common pace is often too fast for some students and too slow for others. In addition, life events, professional or family responsibilities can interfere with a student's capability to complete tasks to an external schedule. Finally, paced models allow students to readily form communities of inquiry and to engage in collaborative work.

Self-paced courses maximize student freedom, as not only can students commence studies on any date, but they can complete a course in as little time as a few weeks or up to a year or longer. Students often enroll in self-paced study when they are under pressure to complete programs, have not been able to complete a scheduled course, need additional courses, or have pressure which precludes regular study for any length of time. The self-paced nature of the programming, though, is an unfamiliar model for many students and can lead to excessive procrastination, resulting in course incompletion. Assessment of learning can also be challenging as exams can be written on any day, making it possible for students to share examination questions with resulting loss of academic integrity. Finally, it is extremely challenging to organize collaborative work activities, though some schools are developing cooperative models based upon networked and connectivist pedagogies for use in self-paced programs.

== Benefits ==
Distance learning can expand access to education and training for both general populace and businesses since its flexible scheduling structure lessens the effects of the many time-constraints imposed by personal responsibilities and commitments. Furthermore, the use of multimodal content such as videos, simulations, and interactive media enhances learner engagement and accommodates diverse learning styles (Veletsianos, 2020). Devolving some activities off-site alleviates institutional capacity constraints arising from the traditional demand on institutional buildings and infrastructure. As a result, more classes can be offered and enable students to enroll in more of their required classes on time and prevent delayed graduation. Furthermore, there is the potential for increased access to more experts in the field and to other students from diverse geographical, social, cultural, economic, and experiential backgrounds. As the population at large becomes more involved in lifelong learning beyond the normal schooling age, institutions can benefit financially, and adult learning business courses may be particularly lucrative. Distance education programs can act as a catalyst for institutional innovation and are at least as effective as face-to-face learning programs, especially if the instructor is knowledgeable and skilled.

Distance education can also provide a broader method of communication within the realm of education. With the many tools and programs that technological advancements have to offer, communication appears to increase in distance education amongst students and their professors, as well as students and their classmates. The distance educational increase in communication, particularly communication amongst students and their classmates, is an improvement that has been made to provide distance education students with as many of the opportunities as possible as they would receive in in-person education. The improvement being made in distance education is growing in tandem with the constant technological advancements. Present-day online communication allows students to associate with accredited schools and programs throughout the world that are out of reach for in-person learning. By having the opportunity to be involved in global institutions via distance education, a diverse array of thought is presented to students through communication with their classmates. This is beneficial because students have the opportunity to "combine new opinions with their own, and develop a solid foundation for learning". It has been shown through research that "as learners become aware of the variations in interpretation and construction of meaning among a range of people [they] construct an individual meaning", which can help students become knowledgeable of a wide array of viewpoints in education. To increase the likelihood that students will build effective ties with one another during the course, instructors should use similar assignments for students across different locations to overcome the influence of co-location on relationship building.

The high cost of education affects students in higher education, and distance education may be an alternative in order to provide some relief. Distance education has been a more cost-effective form of learning, and can sometimes save students a significant amount of money as opposed to traditional education. Distance education may be able to help to save students a considerable amount financially by removing the cost of transportation. In addition, distance education may be able to save students from the economic burden of high-priced course textbooks. Many textbooks are now available as electronic textbooks, known as e-textbooks, which can offer digital textbooks for a reduced price in comparison to traditional textbooks. Also, the increasing improvements in technology have resulted in many school libraries having a partnership with digital publishers that offer course materials for free, which can help students significantly with educational costs.

Within the class, students are able to learn in ways that traditional classrooms would not be able to provide. It is able to promote good learning experiences and therefore, allow students to obtain higher satisfaction with their online learning. For example, students can review their lessons more than once according to their needs. Students can then manipulate the coursework to fit their learning by focusing more on their weaker topics while breezing through concepts that they already have or can easily grasp. When course design and the learning environment are at their optimal conditions, distance education can lead students to higher satisfaction with their learning experiences. Studies have shown that high satisfaction correlates to increased learning. For those in a healthcare or mental health distance learning program, online-based interactions have the potential to foster deeper reflections and discussions of client issues as well as a quicker response to client issues, since supervision happens on a regular basis and is not limited to a weekly supervision meeting. This also may contribute to the students feeling a greater sense of support, since they have ongoing and regular access to their instructors and other students.

Distance learning may enable students who are unable to attend a traditional school setting, due to disability or illness such as decreased mobility and immune system suppression, to get a good education. Children who are sick or are unable to attend classes are able to attend them in "person" through the use of robot proxies. This helps the students have experiences in the classroom and social interaction that they are unable to receive at home or the hospital, while still keeping them in a safe learning environment. Over the last few years more students are entering safely back into the classroom thanks to the help of robots. An article from the New York Times, "A Swiveling Proxy Will Even Wear a Tutu", explains the positive impact of virtual learning in the classroom, and another explains how even a simple, stationary telepresence robot can help. Distance education may provide equal access regardless of socioeconomic status or income, area of residence, gender, race, age, or cost per student. Applying universal design strategies to distance learning courses as they are being developed (rather than instituting accommodations for specific students on an as-needed basis) can increase the accessibility of such courses to students with a range of abilities, disabilities, learning styles, and native languages. Distance education graduates, who would never have been associated with the school under a traditional system, may donate money to the school.

Distance learning provides individuals with access to universities and educational resources that may not be available locally. The online environment facilitates pedagogical innovation such as new program structures and formats. Students have the ability to collaborate, share, question, infer, and suggest new methods and techniques for continuous improvement of the content. The ability to complete a course at a pace that is appropriate for each individual is the most effective manner to learn given the personal demands on time and schedule.

Distance learning can also reduce the phenomenon of rural exodus by enabling students from remote regions to remain in their hometowns while pursuing higher education. Eliminating the distance barrier to higher education can also increase the number of alternatives open to students, and foster greater competition between institutions of higher learning regardless of geography.

== Criticism ==
Barriers to effective distance education include obstacles such as domestic distractions and unreliable technology, as well as students' program costs, adequate contact with teachers and support services, and a need for more experience. Additionally, students' lack of digital literacy and self-regulation skills have contributed to increased dropout rates, emphasizing the need for institutional training support.

Some students attempt to participate in distance education without proper training with the tools needed to be successful in the program. Students must be provided with training opportunities (if needed) on each tool that is used throughout the program. The lack of advanced technology skills can lead to an unsuccessful experience. Schools have a responsibility to adopt a proactive policy for managing technology barriers. Time management skills and self-discipline in distance education is just as important as complete knowledge of the software and tools being used for learning.

The results of a study of Washington state community college students showed that distance- learning students tended to drop out more often than their traditional counterparts due to difficulties in language, time management, and study skills.

According to Pankaj Singhm, director of Nims University, "distance learning benefits may outweigh the disadvantages for students in such a technology-driven society, however before indulging into the use of educational technology a few more disadvantages should be considered." He describes that over multiple years, "all of the obstacles have been overcome and the world environment for distance education continues to improve." Pankaj Singhm also claims there is a debate to distance education stating, "due to a lack of direct face-to-face social interaction. However, as more people become used to personal and social interaction online (for example dating, chat rooms, shopping, or blogging), it is becoming easier for learners to both project themselves and socializes with others. This is an obstacle that has dissipated."

Not all courses required to complete a degree may be offered online. Health care profession programs in particular require some sort of patient interaction through field work before a student may graduate. Studies have also shown that students pursuing a medical professional graduate degree who are participating in distance education courses, favor a face to face communication over professor-mediated chat rooms and/or independent studies. However, this is little correlation between student performance when comparing the previous different distance learning strategies.

There is a theoretical problem with the application of traditional teaching methods to online courses because online courses may have no upper size limit. Daniel Barwick noted that there is no evidence that large class size is always worse or that small class size is always better, although a negative link has been established between certain types of instruction in large classes and learning outcomes; he argued that higher education has not made a sufficient effort to experiment with a variety of instructional methods to determine whether the large class size is always negatively correlated with a reduction in learning outcomes. Early proponents of Massive Open Online Courses (MOOCs) saw them as just the type of experiment that Barwick had pointed out was lacking in higher education, although Barwick himself has never advocated for MOOCs.

There may also be institutional challenges. Distance learning is new enough that it may be a challenge to gain support for these programs in a traditional brick-and-mortar academic learning environment. Furthermore, it may be more difficult for the instructor to organize and plan a distance learning program, especially since many are new programs and their organizational needs are different from a traditional learning program.

Additionally, though distance education offers industrial countries the opportunity to become globally informed, there are still negative sides to it. Hellman states that "These include its cost and capital intensiveness, time constraints and other pressures on instructors, the isolation of students from instructors and their peers, instructors' enormous difficulty in adequately evaluating students they never meet face-to-face, and drop-out rates far higher than in classroom-based courses."

A more complex challenge of distance education relates to cultural differences between students and teachers and among students. Distance programs tend to be more diverse as they could go beyond the geographical borders of regions, countries, and continents, and cross the cultural borders that may exist concerning race, gender, and religion. That requires a proper understanding and awareness of the norms, differences, preconceptions, and potential conflicting issues.

== Assessments ==
Tools have been developed to assess the quality of distance education. Walker developed a survey instrument known as the Distance Education Learning Environment Survey (DELES), which examines instructor support, student interaction, and collaboration, personal relevance, authentic learning, active learning, and student autonomy. Harnish and Reeves provide a systematic approach based on training, implementation, system usage, communication, and support.

== Educational technology ==
The modern use of electronic educational technology (also called e-learning) facilitates distance learning and independent learning through the extensive use of information and communications technology (ICT), replacing traditional content delivery with postal correspondence. Instruction can be synchronous and asynchronous online communication in an interactive learning environment or virtual communities, in lieu of a physical classroom. "The focus is shifted to the education transaction in the form of a virtual community of learners sustainable across time."

One of the most significant issues encountered in the mainstream correspondence model of distance education is transactional distance, which results from the lack of appropriate communication between learner and teacher. This gap has been observed to become wider if there is no communication between the learner and teacher and has direct implications for the learning process and future endeavors in distance education. Distance education providers began to introduce various strategies, techniques, and procedures to increase the amount of interaction between learners and teachers. These measures e.g. more frequent face-to-face tutorials, and increased use of information and communication technologies including teleconferencing and the Internet, were designed to close the gap in transactional distance.

== Credentials ==
Online credentials for learning are digital credentials that are offered in place of traditional paper credentials for a skill or educational achievement. Despite their growth, the acceptability of MOOCs and online certificates varies widely among employers, and questions remain about their recognition and credibility (Kaplan & Haenlein, 2016). Directly linked to the accelerated development of internet communication technologies, the development of digital badges, electronic passports and massive open online courses (MOOCs) have a very direct bearing on our understanding of learning, recognition and levels as they pose a direct challenge to the status quo. It is useful to distinguish between three forms of online credentials: Test-based credentials, online badges, and online certificates.

== See also ==
- Autodidacticism
- Digital divide
- Educational technology
- Low-residency program
- Media psychology
- New media
- Online school
- Qualifications frameworks for online learning
- School of the Air
- Sunrise Semester
- Teleseminars
- Videotelephony
- Virtual education

== Sources ==
- This article incorporates text from a free content work. Licensed under CC-BY-SA IGO 3.0 (license statement/permission). Text taken from Level-setting and recognition of learning outcomes: The use of level descriptors in the twenty-first century, 129-131, Keevey, James; Chakroun, Borhene, UNESCO. UNESCO.
