= Distance Education Learning Environments Survey =

The Distance Education Learning Environments Survey (DELES) is a psychosocial learning environment survey designed specifically to measure college and university distance education learning environments. The DELES was developed in 2003.

The DELES was designed to measure students' perceptions of their distance education social environment through six scales:

1. Instructor Support (Scale I, consisting of 8 items), (e.g. The instructor responds promptly to my questions).
2. Student Interaction and Collaboration (Scale II, consisting of 6 items), (e.g. I collaborate with other students in the class).
3. Personal Relevance (Scale III, consisting of 7 items), (e.g. I can relate what I learn to my life outside of university).
4. Authentic Learning (Scale IV, consisting of 5 items), (e.g. I work on assignments that deal with real-world information).
5. Active Learning (Scale V, consisting of 3 items), (e.g. I explore my own strategies for learning).
6. Student Autonomy (Scale VI, consisting of 5 items), (e.g. I play an important role in my learning.

An additional eight-item scale of student affect (psychology), designated the Enjoyment scale, was included in the original DELES. An example item in this seventh scale reads, "I enjoy studying by distance education."

The 42 DELES items have response value options of: Never, Seldom, Sometimes, Often, and Always.

The DELES focuses on students' perceptions of the learning environment to the exclusion of technical factors such as Internet connectivity or learning platform as found in other distance education learning environment instruments.

== Applications of the DELES ==
The DELES has been utilized in the United States to compare social work students' perceptions of their learning environments in a face-to-face class, a blended learning (hybrid) class, and an asynchronous learning distance education version of the same class. It has also been translated into Chinese and used to identify motivation of Taiwanese adult distance education learners. The DELES has been translated into Arabic and used to determine undergraduate students' perceptions of blended learning in the Arab Open University-Bahrain Branch. The DELES has also been translated into Turkish and used to study Turkish online learning environments—this version is referred to as the Turkish DELES (TR-DELES). A Spanish version, referred to as the Spanish DELES (Sp-DELES), has been validated and utilized with Spanish students. A Portuguese version of the DELES was developed and administered in 2009.

== Significance of the DELES ==
The DELES is significant in the realm of post-secondary distance education because it was the first instrument available to seek associations between the psychosocial learning environment and student satisfaction with their distance education class.

By statistically measuring associations between the six DELES scales and the scale of "Enjoyment", researchers have been able to determine that Personal Relevance is the strongest positive and statistically significant contributor to student satisfaction in distance education in one setting. The Turkish DELES (TR-DELES) researchers discovered that, with their population, student satisfaction was more closely aligned statistically with Instructor Support. Conversely, the Spanish determined, with the Spanish DELES (Sp-DELES), that Active Learning and Autonomy are most influential on distance education student satisfaction. With the Portuguese version of the DELES it was determined that Student Interaction and Collaboration was most closely aligned with student satisfaction in Education courses.

The DELES has consistently held up well in terms of validity and reliability in 27 independent studies, including studies where the DELES has been translated into Mandarin, Turkish, Arabic and Spanish. It has been modified for use in Malaysia and Palestine.

== Forms ==
In addition to aiding researchers in associating psychosocial aspects with student satisfaction, the DELES has three forms. The same scales are used and the items are parallel; however, the wording is slightly different:

- Actual form – This is the original DELES used to determine what students perceive during a class. An item would read: "In this class the instructor responds promptly."
- Preferred form – This version is used to capture what students would like their distance learning class to be like. The same item would read: "In this class I would prefer the instructor to respond promptly."
- Instructor form – This version is used to capture the instructor’s perception of their class. The same item would read: "In my class I respond promptly."

Results can be studied in various ways to gain an in-depth picture of the psychosocial nature of a given distance education learning environment. For instance, the instructor's perspective can be compared to those of the students to see how closely they are aligned or not aligned. Or, the Preferred form can be administered as a pre-test and the Actual form as a post-test and the results analysed for differences and changes.
