= Henry N. Ginsberg =

Henry N. Ginsberg is an American physician, focusing in preventive medicine, internal medicine, endocrinology, lipids, risk factors for heart disease and stroke, diabetes and metabolism, currently the Irving Professor of Medicine at Columbia University.

== Education ==
Ginsberg attended Samuel J. Tilden High School in Brooklyn, graduating in 1962. In 1966, Ginsberg graduated from Brooklyn College with a BS in chemistry. He completed State University of New York Downstate Medical Center in 1970.
