= Richard J. Smith =

Richard Jay Smith, an American anthropologist, (born 1948) is Ralph E. Morrow Distinguished Professor of Physical Anthropology at Washington University in St. Louis. He is now Dean of the Graduate School of Arts & Sciences.

== Education ==
Richard Jay Smith, hailing from Brooklyn, New York, graduated from Samuel J. Tilden High School in that borough in 1965 and spent his undergraduate years at Brooklyn College, earning a bachelor's degree in psychology in 1969. He went on to Tufts University to earn a M.S. in Anatomy as well as a DMD. After Tufts, he studied at Yale University where he earned a master's degree in philosophy in 1978 and a doctorate in anthropology in 1980.

== At Washington University ==
Richard Smith joined the faculty at Washington University in 1984 and served as a professor and chair of the Department of Orthodontics, in the former School of Dental Medicine. He joined the Department of Anthropology in 1991. He founded the Program in Applied Statistics and Computation, now the Center for Applied Statistics, at Washington University, and he served as its first director from 2002 to 2004.

Among undergraduates, Smith is famous for his course "Introduction to Human Evolution," which was one of the most popular classes on campus until his appointment as Dean of the Graduate School of Arts and Sciences in 2008. The course features topics from the historical development of the theory of evolution, fossil evidence, the morphological features of primates, to the beginnings of modern humans and is noted by many students to be particularly engaging, due in part to Smith's dynamic teaching style.

== Research ==
Smith is a specialist in the application of statistics to the general record of human evolution; specifically, how the information of the necessarily incomplete human fossil record can be validly used for complex inferences. He specifically is concerned with the evolution of the human brain, the craniofacial skeleton and gender differences in body size. He has also published studies making use of phylogenetic comparative methods.

== Selected recent publications ==
- "Biology and Body Size in Human Evolution: Statistical Inference Misapplied", Current anthropology. 37, no. 3, (1996): 451–481

Smith, R.J.

- (with W.L. Jungers) "Body mass in comparative primatology." Journal of Human Evolution 32:523-559. (1997)
- (with S.R. Leigh) "Sexual dimorphism in primate neonatal body mass." Journal of Human Evolution 34: 173-201. (1998)
- Statistics of sexual size dimorphism. Journal of Human Evolution 36: 423-458. (1999 )
- (with J.M. Cheverud) "Scaling of sexual dimorphism in body mass: a phylogenetic analysis of Rensch's Rule in primates". International Journal of Primatology 23:1095-1135. (2002)
- " Species recognition in paleoanthropology: implications of small sample sizes." In: Interpreting the Past: Essays on Human, Primate, and Mammal Evolution in Honor of David Pilbeam (DE Lieberman, RJ Smith, and J Kelley, eds.). Boston, Brill Academic Publishers, pp. 207-219. (2005 )
- "Relative size versus controlling for size: interpretation of ratios in research on sexual dimorphism in the human corpus callosum." Current Anthropology 46: 249–273. (2005)
