= Nasir Memon =

American computer scientist

- Education: Birla Institute of Technology and Science, Bachelor of Engineering in Chemical Engineering and Master of Science in Mathematics University of Nebraska, Doctor of Philosophy in Computer Science
- Known for: Center for Interdisciplinary Studies in Security and Privacy, founder Cyber Security Awareness Week (CSAW) Conference, founder Digital Assembly, founder
- Awards: SPIE Fellow 2014, IEEE Fellow 2010, Best Paper Award: IEEE Signal Processing Society, Jacobs Excellence in Education Award, Polytechnic University, 2002
- Scientific career
- Fields: Computer Science
- Institutions: New York University Polytechnic School of Engineering

Nasir Memon is a computer scientist based in Brooklyn, New York. Memon is a professor and chair of the New York University Tandon School of Engineering computer science and engineering department and affiliate faculty at the computer science department in the Courant Institute of Mathematical Sciences at New York University. He is also the Department Head of NYU Tandon Online, the online learning unit of the school. He introduced cyber security studies to New York University Tandon School of Engineering, making it one of the first schools to implement the program at the undergraduate level. Memon holds twelve patents in image compression and security. He is the founding director of the Center for Interdisciplinary Studies in Security and Privacy (CRISSP) and CRISSP Abu Dhabi. In 2002, Memon founded Cyber Security Awareness Week (CSAW), an annual conference where tens of thousands of students compete in events and learn skills in cyber security Memon is also co-founder of Digital Assembly, a software company that develops digital forensics and data recovery and Vivic, a company that produces malware detection software.

== Education ==
In 1982, Memon graduated from Birla Institute of Technology and Science, Pilani, with a Bachelor of Engineering in Chemical Engineering and a Master of Science in Mathematics. He graduated with a Doctor of Philosophy degree in Computer Science from the University of Nebraska in 1992.

== Research ==
=== Digital forensics ===
In the 1990s, Memon learned from law enforcement that there was a need for technology that could recover fragmented data. He and his colleagues researched the problem with files and digital photos and were able to develop a solution. Memon developed an automated software program that can retrieve and reassemble fragmented digital photographs, even when the directions for locating them have been deleted. His software is an example of file carving, which is the restoring of file contents after identifying information has been removed or lost.

In 2006, Memon and two of his students, Pasha Pal and Kulesh Shanmugasundaram founded Digital Assembly, which sells a consumer version of the software, Adroit Photo Recovery, to restore deleted images. Digital Assembly has competed and won the NSF Phase I and Phase II SBIRs as well as an NYSTAR TTIP grant. Digital Assembly's software was featured in an ABC news article regarding the use of technology in the fight against child pornography in 2010.

=== Biometrics and human behavior ===
In 2011, Memon led a project to develop gesture based alternatives to passwords on touch screen devices. The project demonstrated that the owners of a device can be authenticated by the unique touch of their fingers to either supplement or remove the need for a password He created iSignOn, an app sold in Apple's App Store that uses the motion of a person's actual written signature to authenticate him or her. The app is able to distinguish the user's pattern from forgers after the user signs the screen with their finger five times.

=== Network security and steganography ===
In 2005, Memon was featured in the NBC investigative report on terror alerts raised due to bogus analysis. He discussed the art of secret writing called steganography, which allows two parties to communicate with each other without others knowing they are communicating, and how steganalysis software can be used to locate those hidden messages, but it is not always reliable.

In 2009, Memon developed INFER, a network-based infection detection system to identify compromised host computers on large networks primarily for corporate and government systems. This program focuses on detecting systems inside the network infected by malware rather than detection or prevention at the point of entry. INFER was used to track the behavior of 3,000 PCs on The Polytechnic Institute of NYU network. Memon and his students started a company called Vivic to commercialize INFER, which resulted in the U.S. Army Research Laboratory becoming their first paying customer. INFER also has Westchester County, New York government, and the New York City IT Department as customers.

=== Lossless compression ===
In 1995, Memon co-developed the novel context based lossless compression scheme named CALIC with Xialoin Wu. CALIC ranked first in the evaluations conducted by the International Standards Organization (ISO) of the techniques submitted in response to its call for a new lossless image compression standard. The final ISO standard, JPEG-LS, was significantly influenced by the concepts utilized in CALIC.

== Other activities ==
Memon created the Information Systems and Internet Security lab, a hackerspace for students to work both on cyber offense and defense. He is the editor-in-chief of the IEEE Transactions on Information Security and Forensics. Memon has also been an associate editor for IEEE Transactions on Image Processing, the Journal of Electronic Imaging, the ACM Multimedia Systems Journal, the LNCS Transaction on Data Hiding, IEEE Security and Privacy Magazine, IEEE Signal Processing Magazine, and the International Journal on Network Security.

== Recognition ==
Memon has received several awards for his research and lectureship. In 2002, he received the Jacobs Excellence in Education Award from Polytechnic University. In 2010, he became an IEEE Fellow and received the IEEE Signal Processing Society Distinguished Lecturer award for 2011–2012. Memon became a SPIE Fellow in 2014 and was awarded Best Research in Advanced ID Systems: Online Authentication of Digital Signature through Mobile Phones in 2014. He has won best paper awards from IEEE and the Digital Forensics Research Conference. Memon was recognized for his research with the NSF CAREER Award and the Emirates ID Best Research in Advanced ID Systems.

== Bibliography ==
- Sencar, H., & Memon, N. (2013). Digital image forensics there is more to a picture than meets the eye. New York, NY: Springer.
- Memon, N. (2010). Media forensics and security II 18–20 January 2010, San Jose, California, United States. Bellingham, Wash.: SPIE.
- Memon, N. (2011). Media watermarking, security, and forensics III 24–26 January 2011, San Francisco, California, United States. Bellingham, Wash.: SPIE.
- Memon, N. (2012). Media watermarking, security, and forensics 2012 23–25 January 2012, Burlingame, California, United States. Bellingham, Wash.: SPIE.
- Alattar, A., & Memon, N. (n.d.). Media watermarking, security, and forensics 2013: 5–7 February 2013, Burlingame, California, United States.
- Delp, E., Wong, P., Dittmann, J., & Memon, N. (2008). Security, forensics, steganography, and watermarking of multimedia contents X 28–30 January 2008, San Jose, California, USA. Bellingham, Wash.: SPIE .
