= Rosalyn Deutsche =

American art historian, author, and art critic

Rosalyn Deutsche is an art historian, author, and art critic who lives in New York City and teaches modern and contemporary art at Barnard College.

== Early life and education ==
Deutsche earned her Ph.D. at the Graduate Center, City University of New York, writing on the effects of art, architecture and design upon urban settings, under Linda Nochlin. She is married to Robert Ubell.

Deutsche writes and lectures on topics of "art and urbanism, art and the public sphere, and feminist theories of subjectivity in representation."

=== Books ===
Deutsche "has written extensively and lectured internationally on such interdisciplinary topics as art and urbanism, art and the public sphere, art and the declaration of rights, art and war, and feminist theories of subjectivity in visual representation."

She is co-author of "The Fine Art of Gentrification," a 1984 article providing commentary on the profits of commercial galleries and their effects on the communities where they locate. "The art world functions ideologically to exploit the neighborhood for its bohemian or sensationalist connotations while deflecting attention away from underlying social, economic, and political processes," the authors wrote. Deutsche has also said, "...it had become clear to most observers that the visibility of masses of homeless people interferes with positive images of New York, constituting a crisis in the official representation of the city."

== Selected publications ==
- Deutsch, Rosalyn. Not Forgetting: Contemporary Art and the Interrogation of Mastery. University of Chicago Press, 2022.
- Deutsche, Rosalyn. Hiroshima After Iraq: Three Studies in Art and War. Columbia University Press, 2010.
- Deutsche, Rosalyn (1996). Evictions: Art and Spatial Politics. Cambridge, MA: Graham Foundation for Advanced Studies in the Fine Arts; MIT Press. ISBN 978-0262041584.
- Deutsche, Rosalyn. "Architecture of the Evicted." Strategies: A Journal of Theory, Culture and Politics 3 (1990): 159–83.
- Deutsche, Rosalyn, and Cara Gendel Ryan. "The Fine Art of Gentrification." October 31 (1984): 91–111.
- Deutsche, Rosalyn. "Uneven Development: Public Art in New York City." October 47 (1988): 3–52.
- Deutsche, Rosalyn. "Art and Public Space: Questions of Democracy." Social Text 33 (1992): 34–53.
- Deutsche, Rosalyn. "Alternative Space." In If You Lived Here: The City in Art, Theory and Social Activism, edited by Brian Wallis. Bay Press, Seattle (1991).
