= Abraham Lishinsky =

American painter (1905–1982)

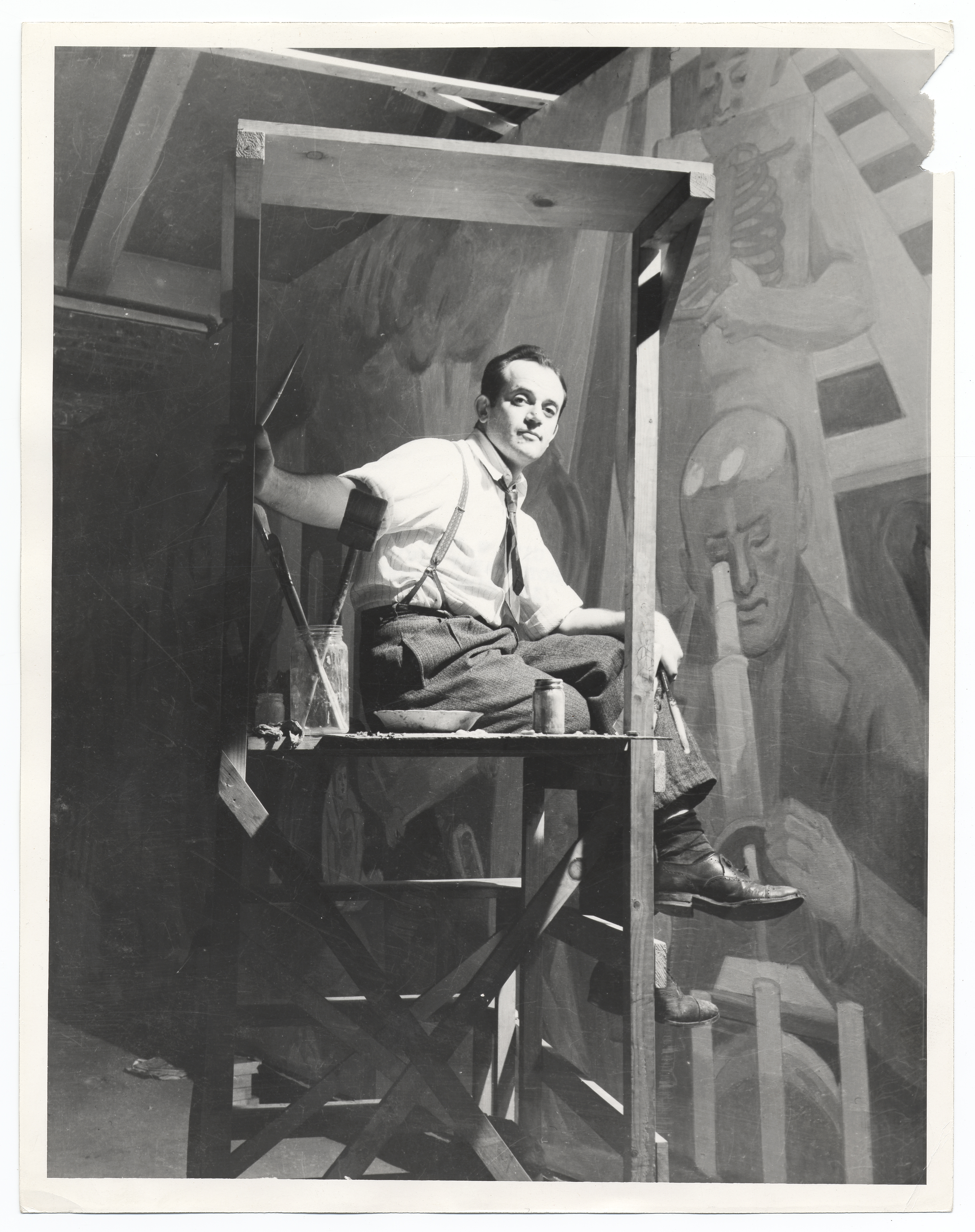
- Abraham Lishinsky painting a mural at the 1939 New York World's Fair.
- Born: 1905; Russian Empire
- Died: 1982 (aged 76–77)
- Education: Educational Alliance, Art Students League, National Academy of Design
- Known for: Painting, muralist, playwright, salesman
- Website: abrahamlishinsky.com

Abraham Lishinsky (1905–1982) was an American artist of the 20th Century, a painter and playwright, best known for seven murals completed for the federally funded agencies of the New Deal programs of the 1930s and 1940s.

Born in the Russian Empire in 1905, he was raised on Manhattan's East Side and in Brooklyn. He studied at the Educational Alliance and the National Academy of Design, and with John Sloan at the Art Students League.

== Mural work ==
Beginning as an assistant to Jean Charlot, the Franco-Mexican muralist, Lishinsky from 1934 to 1943 created seven murals for the PWAP/WPA federal arts programs of the 1930s and 1940s. His earliest mural was painted in collaboration with his mentor Charlot in the lobby of the Straubenmuller Textile High School in Manhattan. The mural survives.

His largest existing work is a 54-panel, 2,400-square-foot (220 m^{2}) mural that wraps around the auditorium at the former Samuel J. Tilden High School in Brooklyn, titled "Major Influences in Civilization." The mural is restored and in excellent condition. Lishinsky, who was the supervising artist on all the murals he painted, invited his colleague and longtime friend Irving A. Block to work with him to create the Tilden mural. Among the assistants hired to work on the mural was the artist Abram "Al" Lerner, who was later founding director of the Hirshhorn Museum and Sculpture Garden.

Lishinsky and Block later collaborated on two other works: A large representational mural on the history of medicine for the Medicine and Public Health pavilion at the 1939 New York World's Fair, sponsored by the American Medical Association, and "Washington and the Battle of the Bronx," a 15-by-5-foot (4.6 m × 1.5 m) historical mural at the Wakefield Station post office in the Bronx, New York, painted under the authority of the United States Treasury Department Section of Fine Arts, and completed in 1943.

The fate of the World's Fair mural, two 70-by-10-foot (21.3 m × 3.0 m) panels, and a 30-by-10-foot (9.1 m × 3.0 m) panel, is unknown. The Wakefield mural was at least until recent years still in place, but in deteriorating condition.

Lishinsky also painted a mural in 1941 for the post office in Woodruff, South Carolina, titled "Cotton Harvest". The mural was restored in 1999 and placed on exhibit in the South Carolina State Museum in Columbia, where it is on permanent loan.

The restored mural "Cotton Harvest" by Abraham Lishinsky, photographed in 1999

Lishinsky painted smaller murals for the solarium at Bellevue Hospital in Manhattan, believed to have been painted over in subsequent years, and the Protestant chapel, later demolished, at the penitentiary at Rikers Island.

== Lishinsky's mural style ==
Although Lishinsky's works for the federal art programs were representational, in the style known as Social Realist, he made many friends among the American adopters of abstract style, including Ilya Bolotowsky and Louis Schanker, and there is a strikingly abstract quality to his mural designs. The figures are monumental, often presented in dreamlike suspension. There is a respect for the flatness of the picture plane, where the figures loom in dignity and where animation resides in structural and textural relationships as much as in ostensible movements. In the Tilden mural, Lishinsky adopted a "grisaille" technique, presenting, within the colorful panels, foreground figures in monochromatic greens to bring together the sprawling space and lend coherence to the work as a whole.

== The evolution of Lishinsky's art ==
Following the end of the federal art programs, and faced with the need to support his wife and four young children, Lishinsky became a salesman. With his buoyant charm, integrity, and ready wit, he was successful, raising his family in a home he bought in 1950 in Flatbush. Although he never ceased to paint in his spare time, he bore a heavy load of frustration in those years in not being able to pursue his art full-time. Lishinsky wrote plays and stories during long hours of travel on his sales trips around the country. His play "The Collaboration" won a CAPS (Creative Artists Public Service Program) award in 1981 from the New York State Council on the Arts.

In the early 1950s, Lishinsky turned to an abstract style, studying with the artist Wallace K. Harrison in New York. With a reserve of savings, he left the business world and took his family to Majorca, Spain, where he spent two years from 1955 to 1957, painting full-time. His work was exhibited upon his return at the Terrain Gallery and in 1958 and 1959, at the Washington Irving Gallery in New York. Compelled to make a living, he returned to the business world, painting on nights and weekends in a studio in the Chelsea neighborhood of Manhattan, and later, in a home studio in Brooklyn.

== Later years ==
In 1971, Lishinsky retired from the business world. At last a full-time painter after years of intermittent work, he found in a style allied to Cubism and abstract expressionism the realization of a lifelong pursuit of art grounded in the structural verities that underlie all art of worth. Meaning in art, he averred, comes not primarily from predetermined subject matter, but from the incalculable warmth of the unconscious as it speaks in forms, colors, and their relationships.

Because he felt he had but limited time to develop his work, Lishinsky declined most invitations to exhibit, only beginning to emerge once more in exhibits in the early 1980s. By that time, he had contracted the illness that would take his life in 1982.
