= Digital Assembly =

- Type: Private limited liability company
- Industry: Computer software
- Founded: New York City, [United States (2006)
- Headquarters: New York City, United States
- Products: Adroit Photo Recovery; Adroit Photo Forensics
- Website: www.digital-assembly.com

Digital Assembly LLC is a privately owned software company based in the downtown area of New York City, United States. It develops data recovery and computer forensics software for Microsoft Windows, which currently include Adroit Photo Recovery, and Adroit Photo Forensics. More products are expected to be released in the future. Digital Assembly was featured in a NY Times article that covered its unique recovery technology.

In the United Kingdom, Digital Assembly Ltd is a web application development company that specialises in Java technologies and Oracle databases. Digital Assembly Ltd develops scalable dynamic websites, e-commerce systems, bespoke Web Content Management Systems, mobile applications, Cloud applications, are specialists in SCORM and develop corporate Learning Management Systems for e-learning. Digital Assembly Ltd in the United Kingdom is not associated with Digital Assembly LLC in the United States.

== History ==
Digital Assembly LLC was established on 3 May 2006 at Brooklyn, New York City, United States and ceased operations on 10 February 2015.
