= Charles Wedemeyer =

Early proponent of distance learning curriculum

Charles A. Wedemeyer
- Born: 1911; Milwaukee, Wisconsin
- Died: 1999 (aged 87–88)
- Known for: Comparative studies to establish value of correspondence/independent/distance learning; Expansion of access to education on six continents; Research on learners, systems, institutional characteristics, media applications, software development; Establishment of field of distance education; Influence on open learning systems worldwide

Charles A. Wedemeyer (1911–1999) was a pioneer in the field of independent and distance learning. He challenged university administrators to expand access and opportunity to autonomous learners. "Educational change is evolutionary, and its tempo is glacial," he wrote.

== Early years ==
Born in Milwaukee, Wisconsin, in 1911, to parents of modest means, Charles Wedemeyer developed a sense of excitement for what he described as “self-initiated” learning. His parents, Adrian August Wedemeyer and Laura Marie Marks Wedemeyer strived to provide books and magazines and an environment conducive to learning. An avid reader, the young Wedemeyer made great use of his local library in his quest for knowledge.[2] He received a Bachelor of Science degree in Education with a major in English, later pursuing a master's degree in English, both from the University of Wisconsin–Madison and Northwestern University. As a young educator, he taught English and Science to disadvantaged youth. It was at that time that he began to formulate his progressive ideas on extending educational opportunities as integral to the democratic project.

== Career ==
What non-traditional learning does not need is anything that would diminish the freedom of choice, autonomy and independence that has kept this kind of learning vital, practical, resourceful, innovative, and humane from the beginning of this century.

— Charles Wedemeyer

Timeline
Year	Event
1930s	English teacher—used WHA radio to expand access
1942-1946	Naval instructor WWII
1954-1964	Director University of Wisconsin’s Correspondence Study Program
1958	USAFI contract for course development for 250,000 service men and women
1961	Ford Foundation grant to study correspondence schools in Europe
1961	Chair Committee on Criteria and Standards (NUEA); Kellogg Fellow UK
1963	Criteria and Standards document — endorsement of 86 university-sponsored institutions
1963-1966	Brandenburg Memorial Essays on Correspondence Instruction
1965	Carnegie Corporation AIM grant
1966	World Trends in Correspondence Education
1967	William H. Lighty professorship in Education
1968-1971	Governor's Task Force on Open Learning
1969-1973	UK Open Univ; ICCE/ICDE President; Institute on Independent Study
1969-1976	Research organisation EDSAT
1972	UNESCO Consultant at HSI University Ethiopia
1975	Doctorate Honoris Causa British Open University

== 1954-1964 ==
Wedemeyer considered that "independent study in the American context is generic for a range of teaching-learning activities that sometimes go by separate names (correspondence study, open education, radio-television teaching, individualised learning)."

A lifelong advocate for independent learning, his best known project was the Articulated Instructional Media initiative, which proved influential in the establishment of Britain’s Open University, now known as the UK Open University.
