= Earl Ubell =

American science and health reporter

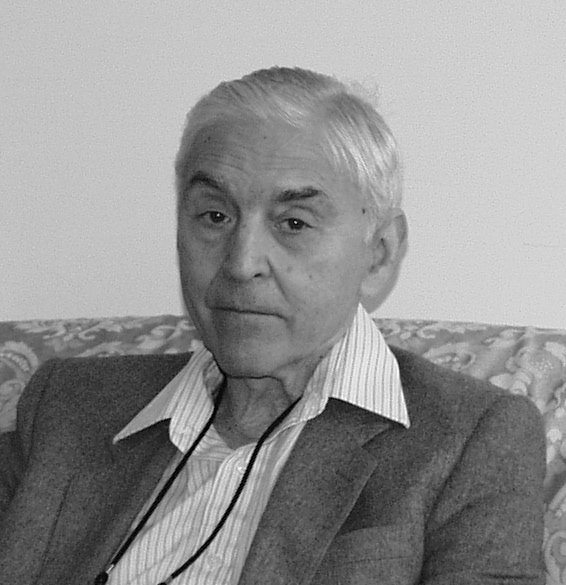
- Earl Ubell in 1999
- Born: Earl Ubell; June 26, 1926; Brooklyn, New York, U.S
- Died: May 30, 2007 (aged 80); Englewood, New Jersey, U.S.
- Education: BS Physics City College of New York 1948
- Occupations: Health and science reporter for newspaper, radio, and television; author
- Years active: 1947 – 1998
- Notable credit(s): New York Herald Tribune; WCBS-TV; Parade magazine
- Spouse: Shirley Leitman Ubell (m. 1949–2007)
- Children: Lori Ubell (b. 1952); Michael Ubell (b. 1953)

Earl Ubell (June 21, 1926 – May 30, 2007) was an innovative science and health reporter, and editor primarily for the New York Herald Tribune and WCBS-TV from the late 1940s to the 1990s.

== Early life ==
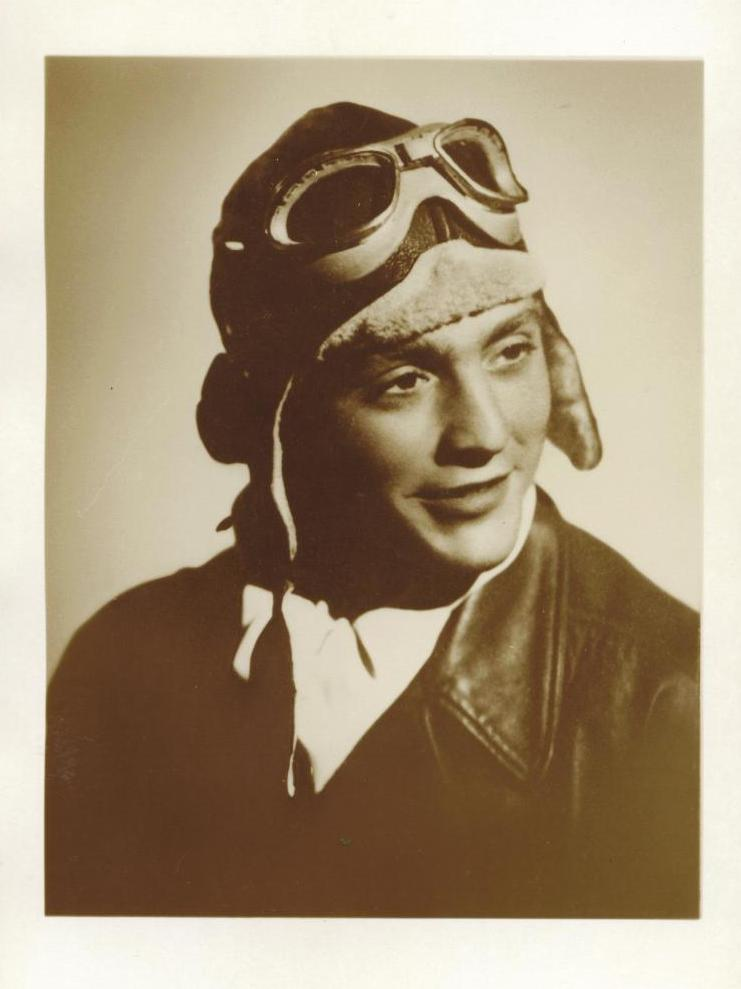
Ubell in the Naval Air Corps

Ubell was born in Brooklyn, New York, the oldest of four sons of European immigrants. He spoke exclusively Yiddish until he entered school. He attended New York City public schools, including Samuel J. Tilden High School, where he was editor-in-chief of the school paper and remembered as: "Typical American Boy - Most likely to succeed". He received his BA in physics as an A student from the City College of New York in 1948 and was a member of Phi Beta Kappa society. Ubell served in the United States Naval Air Corps and trained as a radio man/gunner at the end of World War II. Ubell was married in 1949 to Shirley Leitman, a dancer. In 1952 they moved to Bergen County, New Jersey where they lived and raised two children until 1970. Later on, he lived in Manhattan.

He is the brother of Robert Ubell.

== Career ==
=== Early years at the New York Herald Tribune ===
At 16, Ubell became a messenger at the New York Herald Tribune. He was soon promoted to the night secretary of the managing editor. He worked there through high school and college. When he returned from his service in the Navy during World War II, he was made a city reporter. With his background in science, that topic soon became his beat.

=== Science editor at New York Herald Tribune ===
Ubell became science editor at the Tribune in 1953 and covered the significant stories of the 50s and 60s. His reporting included an in-depth analysis of the report on female sexual behavior by Alfred Kinsey in 1953, putting the word "orgasm" on the front page of the Tribune. Ubell reported on the early days of the Space Race, starting with his report on the first satellite to orbit Earth. Ubell reported on the Sputnik 1 launch, starting with the words: "Our planet has a new moon tonight". He reported on many other scientific advances, including the development of the polio vaccine and the discovery of the structure of DNA.

Ubell became well regarded for his ability to translate science into English that a layperson could understand and received several awards, including one from the American Association for the Advancement of Science for his reporting on Steady State theory in an article titled, "How Joke Begot Theory of Universe". Ubell spent summers working in the laboratories of scientists to increase his scientific knowledge. His research included work with noted scientists at the California Institute of Technology, Brooklyn Polytechnic Institute, Weizmann Institute in Israel, and the Jackson Laboratory in Maine. Ubell earned the respect the scientists he covered, such as physicist Richard Feynman, who praised an article Ubell wrote about a talk given by Feynman on gravity, saying: "Usually science reporting is no damn good at all. But the last line — ah, there is a man who understands, and says it better than I can!"

Ubell's columns also appeared in the Los Angeles Times beginning in 1959. He worked at the Tribune until it merged with two other New York newspapers, triggering a long strike. The merger did not work and the papers ceased publication shortly after that.

=== Health and Science Editor at WCBS-TV ===
Ubell became part of WCBS-TV's newscast team as health and science editor in 1966. He was also a weatherman at the station for part his tenure. Except for six years as news director at WNBC-TV, he worked at CBS until his retirement in 1995. He completed his career at WCBS-TV with a two-part series about his own struggles with Parkinson's disease.

=== News Director at WNBC-TV ===
Ubell became news director for WNBC-TV in 1972. He revamped the news programing there by installing the first "beat" system in any local television news operation. This meant that reporters specialized in different topics, like medicine or politics. He also added a 5 p.m. newscast and renamed the newscasts NewsCenter 4. These changes successfully brought the newscast from the bottom to number one in the ratings and was picked up by the other NBC stations. While news director at WNBC-TV, Ubell continued his science writing for other outlets, including a yearlong series in The New York Times on medicine and health in 1972.

=== Radio work ===
During a long strike at the Herald Tribune in 1961 Ubell formed Ubell-Loory Science Features with Stuart Loory, who worked for him on the Herald Tribune science staff. They did freelance magazine writing and science reporting and commentary for WNEW-FM radio in New York and the other Metromedia stations throughout the country. Ubell had been asked to be science editor for WNEW radio and the two of them worked together while continuing to work for the Herald Tribune. They covered early crewed space flights for WNEW and the Herald Tribune simultaneously from Cape Canaveral. After the newspaper strike ended they continued the association.

=== Parade magazine – Village Voice ===
During the time Ubell was news director he also was health editor and wrote columns for Parade magazine. He also wrote columns for the Village Voice during this period.

=== Promoting the profession of science writing ===
Ubell was active in the National Association of Science Writers, an organization founded "to foster the dissemination of accurate information regarding science through all media normally devoted to informing the public" and served as president of the group. As scientific developments quickened in the late 20th century, members were concerned that science reporting would not live up to their standards and that science reporting would "drop to the level of police beat coverage", so they founded a separate educational foundation, the Council for the Advancement of Science Writing. Ubell was its first president.

=== Books ===
Ubell wrote several science books for children with photographs by Arline Strong:

- The World of Push and Pull, 1964
- The World of The Living, 1965
- The World of Candle and Color, 1969

Ubell also wrote these books on health and living:

- Live Longer, Live Better, 1975
- How to Save Your Life, 1976
- Mother/Father/You: The Adult's Guide to Getting Along Great with Parents and In-Laws, with Carol Flax, 1980
- Getting Your Way — the Nice Way: A Guide for Parents and Grown-up Children, with Carol Flax, 1982
- You Can Fight Depression, 1989
- Parade Family Health Companion: A Reassuring Guide to Dealing with Life's Day-to-Day Health Issues, with Randi Londer, 1996

Ubell was editor of:

- Encyclopedia of Russia and the Soviet Union, 1960

== Other activities ==
Ubell was active in promoting the arts, particularly in his home state of New Jersey.

=== Center For Modern Dance Education ===
In 1962, Ubell and his wife, Shirley, founded the Center for Modern Dance Education in Hackensack, New Jersey. Earl Ubell served as chairman of the board and was involved in promotion and fundraising. Shirley Ubell served as artistic and executive director. The school continues to serve the northern New Jersey community.

=== Dance Notation Bureau ===
Ubell's interest in dance led him to support the work of the Dance Notation Bureau, a foundation formed to record and preserve dance though the Labanotation system of notating movement. Ubell served on the board until 2001 and as chairman of the board from 1966 to 1985. Ubell guided the foundation to greater use of technology, including shepherding the development of an IBM Selectric typewriter print ball for Labanotation and the computerization of Labanotation.

=== Parkinson's Disease Foundation ===
After being diagnosed with Parkinson's disease around 1995, Ubell became active at the Parkinson's Disease Foundation and served on its board of directors from 1996 to 2006, helping to stage several science news seminars to help disseminate news of disease science and research developments. Ubell also served as vice president of the Parkinson's Unity Walk, an organization whose goal is to raise awareness of the disease and to raise funds for research to find a cure. In 2008 an award in Ubell's honor was established to be given to a journalist for outstanding contributions to the public understanding of Parkinson's disease and related movement disorders.

== Death ==
Ubell died from the complications of Parkinson's on May 30, 2007, a month shy of his 81st birthday. A memorial was held at the CUNY Graduate School of Journalism on July 31 of that year. The school had recently located to the building formerly occupied by the New York Herald Tribune.

== Honors and awards ==
- Lasker Award for outstanding reporting on medical research and public health, 1958
- Science Journalism Award, American Association for the Advancement of Science, 1960
- The American Psychological Foundation's 1965 award for Distinguished Science Writing
- Emmy awards for NewsCenter 4 (as news director of WNBC-TV) 1974, 1975
