= Harvey Probber =

American furniture designer

Harvey Probber (September 17, 1922 – February 16, 2003) was an American furniture designer who is credited with inventing sectional, modular seating in the 1940s. A "pioneer in the application of modular seating," many of his ideas have been adopted by other designers.

== Early life and education ==
Harvey Probber was born in Brooklyn, New York in 1922. While attending Samuel J. Tilden High School, he took a part-time job in a used-furniture store, and was inspired to try his hand at drawing ideas for furniture. Probber sold his first sofa design when he was just 16, for $10. After high school graduation, he accepted a job as designer for Trade Upholstery, a small manufacturing facility on West 17th Street. 1940 was the beginning of American modernism, a time characterized by young designers with talent, initiative, and a willingness to take risks with new ideas. Probber was one of an early band of pioneers in a field that included D.J. DePree of Herman Miller, Hans Knoll, Georg Tanier and Jack Lenor Larsen.

== Design career and Harvey Probber, Inc. ==
Probber established Harvey Probber, Inc., in 1945 and in the middle years of the 20th century, Harvey Probber became one of America's leading designers. Though he considered himself a modern designer, his approach to modernity favored exotic woods, highly polished lacquer, hand-rubbed finishes and opulent upholstery fabrics—materials largely abandoned by more radical, Bauhaus-influenced designers. Probber's designs, like those of Edward Wormley, Tommi Parzinger, were sought after by customers who wanted modern furniture with elegance. In 1947, when showroom space wasn't available in Chicago's Merchandise Mart, he took his line to Grand Rapids, then the center of the furniture manufacturing industry. In 1948, seeing the potential in the interior design market he opened a showroom at 136 Fifth Avenue, catering exclusively to designers. His elastic sling chair and Nuclear upholstered groups were chosen for MoMA's Good Design exhibition in 1951, and he won several prestigious Roscoe industry awards.

The advertising agency Papert Koenig Lois received recognition in 1963 from the Art Directors Club of New York in that year's Annual for a print advertisement they created for Probber's company. The full-page ad featured a photograph of one of Probber's chairs with a matchbook tucked under one of its feet. The headline read, "If your Harvey Probber chair wobbles, straighten your floor."

=== Modular seating ===
Probber's most significant design breakthrough came when he was exploring approaches to seating furniture and found that, "the key to salvation was in bits and pieces of plane geometry… they were meaningless alone, but when fused to conventional shapes, profoundly altered their character." These "bits and pieces" became templates for the line he named the Sert Group (after architect Jose Luis Sert). It consisted of nineteen different elements that could be assembled into any desired seating configuration.

Probber referred to the concept as a modular system, and the individual pieces as modules. Although what was then called "unit furniture" dates to the first decades of the twentieth century, Probber's modular seating was the first of its kind. Taking the concept further, he introduced "nuclear furniture"—which included occasional tables with interchangeable pedestals, in different shapes and sizes that could, like seating, be clustered in varying configurations. In the 1960s, he extended the idea to case goods, making it possible to offer many variations on one basic design... the same case was available in a choice of finishes, legs, bases, heights, and hardware. Differences that were cosmetic rather than conceptual were economical to produce—evidence that Probber's business acumen matched his design ability.

By the 1970s, Harvey Probber, Inc. had opened trade showrooms in major design centers across the country, and had relinquished the residential market for the larger and more lucrative contract furniture field. During this period, Probber's work was awarded two "Best of Neocon" Gold Awards from the Resources Council of the Institute of Business Designers for the Houston Chair (1977) and the Advent III Customization Program (1981). He never abandoned his interest in seating modules, however, and continued to explore variations of the concept.

== Reintroduction ==
The Harvey Probber Design Archive signed an agreement with M2L in 2013 to reintroduce his furnishings to the American market. The first line of products included a deep tuft sectional sofa.
