= Samuel J. Tilden High School =

Public school in New York City

Coordinates: 40°38′54″N 73°55′20.2″W

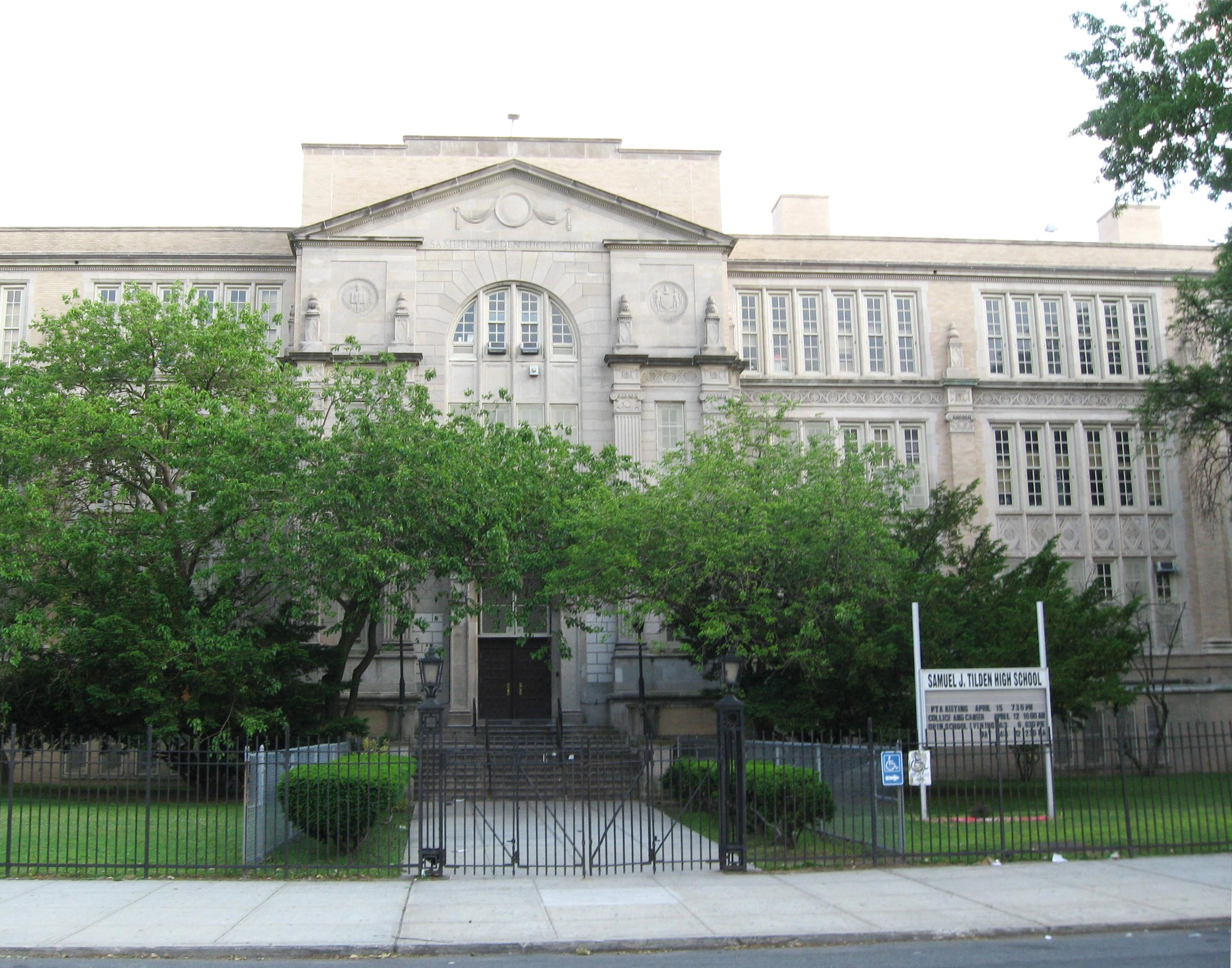
- From Tilden Avenue (north side)
- Brooklyn, New York; United States

Information
- Type: Public
- Established: 1930

Samuel J. Tilden High School was a New York City public high school in the East Flatbush section of Brooklyn, New York City. It was named for Samuel J. Tilden, the former governor of New York State and presidential candidate who, although carrying the popular vote, lost to Rutherford B. Hayes in the disputed election of 1876.

In order to save the New York City government money during the Great Depression, Samuel J. Tilden High School, Bayside High School, Abraham Lincoln High School, John Adams High School, Walton High School, Andrew Jackson High School, and Grover Cleveland High School and Far Rockaway High School were all built from one set of blueprints.

== History ==
=== Early history ===
Plans to construct Samuel J. Tilden High School were filed in 1927. The construction of the school was estimated to cost between $2,500,000 and $3,000,000 and would feature specialized facilities including a swimming pool, rifle range, auditorium with a capacity of more than 1300, library, and science laboratories. While the school was eventually constructed on Tilden Avenue and East 57th Street, residents in Brownsville, the Coney Island Chamber of Commerce, and Borough President James J. Bryne initially opposed the site because of poor transportation options around the location.

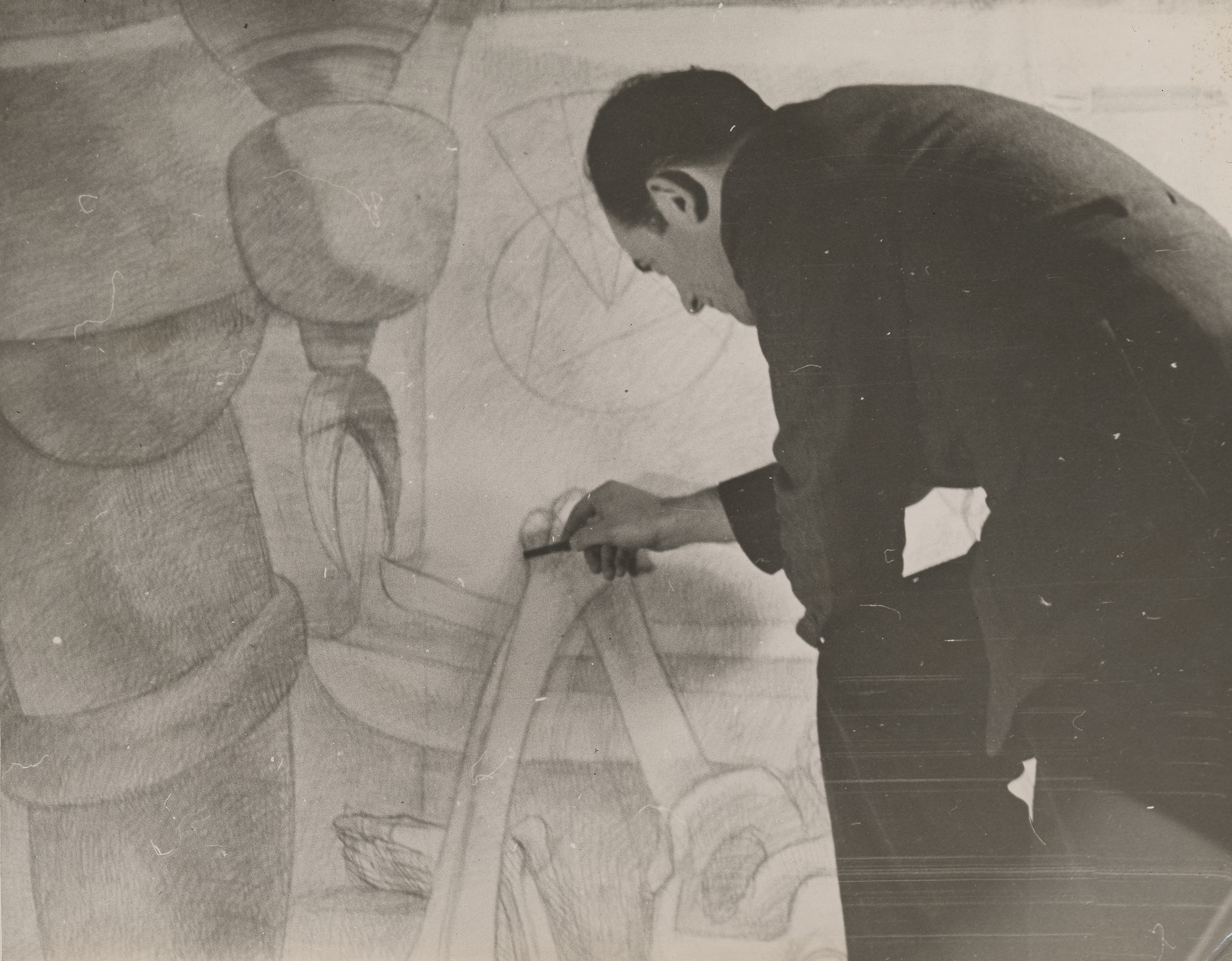
Abraham Lishinsky working on The Major Influences in Civilization at the school in 1939. From the collection of the Archives of American Art.

Shortly after the Board of Education decided on the location of Samuel J. Tilden High School, a formal recommendation was made to change the name of not-yet-built school to Edward B. Shallow High School. This recommendation followed the death of Edward B. Shallow, the Superintendent of the Board of Education who initially recommended a high school be named after New York Governor, Samuel J. Tilden.

Tilden High School opened on February 3, 1930. It cost $2,500,000 to construct. It was built to serve 3,969 students.

In 1935, a field and stadium were designed and constructed with Works Progress Administration labor and appropriations. Several years later, the WPA would make another addition to the Samuel J. Tilden High School, this time in the form of a mural for the auditorium. The project took nearly two years to complete, as muralist Abraham Lishinsky, working with his colleague Irving A. Block, designed and painted a 2,400-square-foot (220 m^{2}) mural depicting “Major Influences in Civilization” for the auditorium. Among the six assistants they employed over time was the artist Abram "Al" Lerner.

By the 1940s, Tilden H.S., initially criticized for its difficult-to-reach location, was overcrowded. At one point 5,700 students attended. In order to limit the crowding, S.J. Tilden administrators split the school day offering one session from 7:50am to 1:04pm and another from 1:11pm to 5:45pm.

=== World War II ===
In 1942, Samuel J. Tilden H.S. was the first Brooklyn high school to hold a mass blood drive. This was one of many ways that World War II affected students at Tilden. During the war, new home economics curricula were introduced to better prepare girls for the war effort. Girls took cooking classes that taught them how to cook more with less, as everyday ingredients were rationed and shipped off to soldiers. There were no food surpluses, and soldiers were the main priority at the time.

Other students supported the war by purchasing more than $15,000 in United States Savings Bonds and Stamps (see war bonds) to help the government finance military operations, leading the nation in money raised by students. Over 100 girls knit sweaters and scarves in conjunction with the British War Relief Fund and American Red Cross. The Red Cross also agreed to send instructors to teach nursing and first aid methods; if the war were to last long enough, the girls would become nurses-in-aid to care for wounded soldiers.

==== Red Scare ====
During the 1940s and 1950s, individuals and organizations all over the United States were accused of affiliations with socialists, communists, and radicals. At Tilden High School, students and teachers were accused of radicalism. Even the then principal Dr. Abraham Lefkowitz was accused of being a radical for distributing a statement to teachers and students that denounced complete free enterprise and called upon students to think critically about their role in America.

Students were also affected by the Red Scare and were warned by administrators that affiliation with Communist-linked clubs such as the American Youth for Democracy would adversely affect their future careers.

During testimony before the United States Senate Subcommittee on Internal Security, a former student claimed that both Mr. Eugene Jackson, a language teacher at Tilden, and Mr. Terry Rosenbaum had expressed sympathy toward student Red groups. The former student alleged that an American Youth for Democracy unit at school was asking to obtain speakers for the unit's meetings. Apparently, Mr. Jackson told them that he agreed with their point of view and thought it was very good.

By the late 1940s, students had to pledge an oath of loyalty to the United States and State of New York in order to receive a diploma. The oath read as follows:

“I hereby declare my loyalty to the Constitution and Government of the United States and the State of New York and promise to support their laws.”

=== Racial integration & Special Honors Programs (including the LPC Program) ===
The racial tensions that swept the nation during the 1960s and 1970s were felt at Samuel J. Tilden High School as well. The school's black population was growing. The school's demographics were changing; Tilden High School was becoming more diverse. In 1962, of the 5,000 students that attended Tilden HS, 97.9% were Jewish and Italian. By 1971, of the 3,000 students at Tilden, 63.4% were “others”, the Board of Education's term for non-blacks and non-Puerto Ricans. Changing demographics and under-enrollment set the stage for controversy around rezoning and plans for Samuel J. Tilden HS.

Tensions came to a head during the March 1972 hearings on rezoning the catchment areas for three Brooklyn high schools. The hearings aimed to assure an integrated education in Samuel J. Tilden High School, Canarsie High School, and South Shore High School. Parents groups linked to each high school had their own ideas for a zoning plan that would preserve the racial and ethnic diversity of each school while maintaining a quality education for every student.

A number of Tilden High School students prepared a flier in which they outlined their position regarding the rezoning. They wanted to preserve an ethnic balance in the school but wanted to avoid a result in which the majority of students were nonwhite. The students who prepared the flier were concerned that if the ethnic balance were to tip too much, "an unfortunate chain of events [would take] place: white families [would flee] the neighborhood." The school and the surrounding neighborhood would no longer remain integrated. The result would be "another segregated school, another segregated neighborhood.” Whether unfortunate or not—that, in fact, did occur to both the neighborhood and the school over the remainder of the 1970s and into the 1980s.

In order for some NYC high schools to be able attract students that lived outside the neighborhood from which the school normally drew its student population under zoning, and to enhance student choice about where to attend high school, specialized honors programs (i.e. special enriched studies programs) were established within various high schools across the city, including Samuel J. Tilden High School in Brooklyn. One such enriched program, at Samuel J. Tilden High School during the 1970s, was the "Law, Politics & Community Affairs" Program (known as the LPC Program, for short). The LPC program was part of, and was administered by, the school's "Social Studies" department. It included specialized courses and Law, Politics and Community Affairs themed field trips and special projects. Students from all over the city would be able to apply to these specialized honors programs (including the LPC program at Tilden High). This marked a shift in New York City School zoning, as a student's school options were no longer only determined by geography.

Tilden High School's demographics continued to change into the 1970s and 1980s paralleling changes in the surrounding neighborhood, East Flatbush. The neighborhood saw increased immigration from the Caribbean. Media coverage of Samuel J. Tilden also changed, with a focus on incidents of violence. Although crime had become a problem in East Flatbush, the media coverage prompted the then principal Everett Kerner to state that the high school was getting a "bum rap.”

=== Dissolution ===
In 2006, the Department of Education declared Samuel J. Tilden High School to be a failed school. In 2007 it became the Tilden Educational Complex, home to several new, separate small schools. These include the Cultural Academy for the Arts and Sciences (CAAS), the Kurt Hahn Expeditionary Learning School, and It Takes A Village Academy (ITAVA). With the growth of the new schools, Samuel J. Tilden High School was finally phased out in June 2010.

== Athletics ==
When it opened in 1929, Principal John M. Loughran adopted the slogan, “athletics for all.” Equipped with facilities, sports field, three gymnasiums, swimming pool, etc., Principal Loughran set to find the personnel and coaches that would establish Tilden High Blue and Greys as an athletic power in New York City.

The sports program hit its first obstacle 1934 as the faculty moved to change the baseball and football teams from inter-school competitive programs to intramurals in efforts to better distribute the school budget while balancing school spirit.

In 1935, a new stadium was constructed and designed by the WPA. This new facility and the gyms inside the building were made available to adults in the community several years earlier during evenings, with separate times for men and women.

The Tilden Blue and Grey won a number of Public Schools Athletic League titles in football, baseball, tennis, track, swimming, and fencing.

During the summer of 1987, teacher and Dean of students Joanne Belinksy became the sixth woman in history to run 3,000 miles (4,800 km) across the country.

== In film ==
The movie Above The Rim was shot at Samuel J. Tilden. Also, exterior scenes for the movie Lords of Flatbush were shot at Tilden.

== Notable alumni and teachers ==
- Jerry Adler—Theater director and producer
- Donna Allegra – Class of 1970; writer
- Edward K. Archer aka Special Ed - Rapper
- Irwin Cohen - real estate developer who created Chelsea Market.
- Ed Cota – professional basketball player
- James E. Davis – Class of 1980. NYPD Police Officer, Christian Minister, Political activist, New York City Councilperson (D-35th District)
- Charles S. Dubin – film and television director
- Mitchell Jay Feigenbaum – Mathematical physicist and discoverer of the Feigenbaum constants
- Fresh Kid Ice - rapper, known for being the co-founder of the rap group 2 Live Crew
- Henry J. Foner - teacher; union activist
- Henry N. Ginsberg - Class of 1962. Irvin Professor of Medicine, Columbia University; work on lipids and risk for heart attack and stroke
- Nelson George – author
- Owen Gill – NFL Indianapolis Colts
- Bill Gold – graphic designer and film poster artist
- Don Goldstein - All American and Pan American champion basketball player
- Sid Gordon – 2-time All Star major league baseball player
- Ed Goodgold – music industry executive who coined the term "trivia," former manager of Sha Na Na
- Arnold Greenberg - co-founder of Snapple
- Josh Greenfeld – writer
- Sidney (Sonny) Hertzberg – NBA basketball player
- Jerry Hyman, trombone Blood, Sweat & Tears, Albums II, III, Greatest Hits
- Paula A. Johnson, MD, MPH, Class of 1976, Researcher and Professor, President Wellesley College
- Paul Kupperberg, Class of 1973, author and comic book writer and editor
- Norman Lear - Screenwriter, Producer
- Sam Levenson, Spanish teacher who became a humorist and popular television personality
- Dan Lurie - body builder, TV personality
- Bill Macy – actor, most notably in TV series Maude
- Paul Marks - cancer researcher
- Leonard Marsh - co-founder of Snapple
- Neil Meron – Hollywood producer
- William Messing – mathematician
- Amy Paulin – New York State Assemblywoman (D-88th District)
- Sam Perkins – professional basketball player
- Frank Press- Science Advisor to Pres. Jimmie Carter; President of the National Academy of Sciences
- Harvey Probber - Furniture Designer
- Willie Randolph – professional baseball player; 6-time American League All Star; played on two World Series Champion teams (New York Yankees); and former manager of the New York Mets
- Dr. Gail Reed-Barnett - former New York State Committeewoman/District Leader, Assembly District 58th
- Eleanor Reissa - actress, singer, director, choreographer / Broadway, Off-Broadway, Yiddish Theater
- Lucille Roberts – businesswoman and founder of health club chain bearing her name
- Ossie Schectman – NBA basketball player - credited with scoring 1st basket in NBA History (New York Knickerbockers 1946–47)
- Irvin S. Schonfeld-known for his contribution to occupational health psychology.
- Al Sharpton – Pentecostal minister, political activist, civil rights activist, and former candidate for the Democratic nomination for President of the United States in 2004.
- Dean Silvers – film producer/writer/director/entertainment lawyer
- Richard J. Smith – Class of 1965. Anthropologist
- Curtis Stevens – professional boxer
- Irv Torgoff - professional basketball player
- Earl Ubell – science and health journalist
- Gary I. Wadler – sports physician
- Marilyn B. Young – Historian
