= Online university =

Higher education program on the Internet

A virtual university (or online university) provides higher education programs through electronic media, typically the Internet. Some are bricks-and-mortar institutions that provide online learning as part of their extended university courses while others solely offer online courses. They are regarded as a form of distance education. The goal of virtual universities is to provide access to the part of the population who would not be able to attend a physical campus, for reasons such as distance—in which students live too far from a physical campus to attend regular classes; and the need for flexibility—some students need the flexibility to study at home whenever it is convenient for them to do so.

Some of these organizations exist only as loosely tied combines of universities, institutes or departments that together provide a number of courses over the Internet, television or other media, that are separate and distinct from programs offered by the single institution outside of the combine. Others are individual organizations with a legal framework, yet are called "virtual" because they appear only on the Internet, without a physical location aside from their administration units. Still other virtual universities can be organized through specific or multiple physical locations, with or without actual campuses to receive program delivery through technological media that is broadcast from another location where professors give televised lectures.

Program delivery in a virtual university is administered through Information and communications technology such as web pages, e-mail and other networked sources.

As virtual universities are relatively new and vary widely, questions remain about accreditation and the quality of assessment.

== History ==
The defining characteristic of all forms and generations of distance education is the separation of student and teacher in time and space. Distance education can be seen as the precursor to online learning. Before the advent of virtual universities, many higher education institutions offered some distance education through print-based correspondence courses. These courses were often referred to as a "course in a box". These have been developed so that students can obtain almost immediate feedback from professors and online tutors through e-mails or online discussions.

When the term "virtual" was first coined in the computational sense, it applied to things that were simulated by the computer, like virtual memory. Over time, the adjective has been applied to things that physically exist and are created or carried on by means of computers.

The Open University in the United Kingdom was the world’s first successful distance teaching university. It was founded in the 1960s on the belief that communications technology could bring high quality degree-level learning to people who had not had the opportunity to attend campus universities. The idea for a "wireless university" was first discussed at the BBC (British Broadcasting Corporation) by the educationalist and historian J.C. Stobbart. From these early beginnings, more ideas came forth until finally the Labour Party under the leadership of Harold Wilson formed an advisory committee to establish an Open University.

With the goal of bringing higher education to all those who wanted to access it, the committee came up with various scenarios before settling on the name Open University. The first idea floated in the UK was to have a "teleuniversity" which would combine broadcast lectures with correspondence texts and visits to conventional universities. In the "teleuniversity" scenario courses are taught on the radio and television and in fact many universities adopted the use of this technology for their distance education courses. The name "teleuniversity" morphed into the "University of Air" which still had the same goal of reaching the lower-income groups who did not have access to higher education. The name "University of Air" did not stick and by the time the first students were admitted in January 1971 the name had become what it is today "Open University". OU proved that it was possible to teach university-level courses to students at a distance.

By 1980, total student numbers at OU had reached 70,000 and some 6,000 people were graduating each year. The 1980s saw increased expansion continue as more courses and subject areas were introduced; as the importance of career development grew, so the university began to offer professional training courses alongside its academic programmes. By the mid-nineties, the OU was using the internet. As of 2008, more than 180,000 students were interacting with OU online from home.

The idea of a virtual university as an institution that used computers and telecommunications instead of buildings and transport to bring students and teachers together for university courses was first published in works like "Deschooling Society" by Ivan Illich that introduced the concept of the use of computer networks as switchboards for learning, in 1971. In 1971 George Kasey, a media(activist)ethicist, delivered a series of lectures on "the Philosophy of Communications De-Design" under the sponsorship of Phil Jacklin PhD, professor at University of California San Jose, a member of "The (San Francisco)Bay Area Committee for Open Media and Public Access." The lectures contained the theoretical outlines for use of telecommunications and media for de-schooling and de-design of mainstream education and an alternative Virtual Free University system. By 1972 George Kasey established "Media Free Times - periodical Multimedia Random Sampling of Anarchic Communications Art" a prototype for remote learning with the use of "multi-media periodicals," that are now commonly referred to as "web pages". In 1995, John Tiffin and Lalita Rajasingham discussed these ideas in their book "In Search Of the Virtual Class: Education in an Information Society" (London and New York, Routledge). It was based on a joint research project at Victoria University of Wellington that ran from 1986-1996. Called the Virtual Class Laboratory, it used dedicated telecommunication systems to make it possible for students to attend class virtually or physically and was at first supported by a number of telecommunication organisations. Its purpose was to seek the critical factors in using ICT for university-level education. In 1992 the virtual class lab moved onto the Internet.

A number of other universities were involved in the late eighties in pioneering initiatives and experiments were conducted between Victoria University in New Zealand, the University of Hawaii, Ohio State University and Waseda University to try and conduct classes and courses at an international level via telecommunications. This led to the concept of a Global Virtual University.

== Coursework ==
Providing access to higher education for all students, especially adult learners, is made easier by the fact that most virtual universities have no entry requirements for their undergraduate courses. Entry requirements are needed for the courses that are aimed at postgraduates or those who work in specific jobs.

Studying in a virtual university has essential differences from studying in a brick and mortar university. There are no buildings and no campus to go to because students receive learning materials over the Internet. In most cases, only a personal computer and an Internet connection are needed that traditionally required physical presence of students in the classroom. Course materials can include printed material, books, audio and video cassettes, TV programmes, CD-ROM/software, and web sites. Support is offered to learners from the professor or a tutor online through e-mails if they are having problems with the course.

Taking courses online means that students will be learning in their own time by reading course material, working on course activities, writing assignments and perhaps working with other students through interactive teleconferences. Online learning can be an isolating experience since the student spends the majority of their time working by themselves. Some learners do not mind this kind of solo learning, but others find it a major stumbling block to the successful completion of courses. Because of the potential difficulty of maintaining the schedule needed to be successful when learning online, some virtual universities apply the same type of time management as traditional schools. Many courses operate to a timetable, which the student receives with the course materials. These may include the planned activities for each week of the course and due dates for the assignments. If the course has an exam, the students will be informed where they have to go to write it.

An example of a university that maintains a tight schedule is the Virtual Global University (VGU) in Germany. VGU offers a graduate program "International Master of Business Informatics" (MBI)—a master program in information technology and management that takes an average of four semesters to complete (for full-time students). Each course has a lecture or a virtual class meeting every week. Afterwards, students get a homework assignment; for example, they have to solve an exercise, elaborate on some problem, discuss a case study, or take a test. Lecturers give them immediate feedback, and one week later, the same happens again.

Coursework can be the same for a Virtual University as the On-campus University in certain cases. NYU Tandon Online, for example, provides the same course work to its online students as the on-campus students at the NYU Tandon School of Engineering. This is done using advanced technologies.

== Teaching modes ==
When online courses first began, the primary mode of delivery was through a two way audio-visual network. Then as well as now, many of the virtual study programs were mainly based on text documents, but multimedia technologies have become increasingly popular as well. These web-based delivery modes are used in order to expand access to programs and services that can be offered anytime and anywhere. The spectrum of teaching modes in virtual education includes courses based on hypertext, videos, audios, e-mails, and video conferencing. Teaching on the web through courseware such as WebCT and Blackboard are also used. See Virtual education.

== Quality ==
Students taking "virtual" courses are doing real work to get their degrees, and educators preparing and teaching those courses spend real time in doing so. That is, students meet a comparable level of academic learning outcomes and are evaluated through programs constructed according to standard university-level criteria. Though it should not be assumed, virtual universities may be accredited in the same way as traditional universities and operate according to a similar set of academic standards.

However, questions remain about accreditation and the quality of assessment. Accreditation is required to assure students that the online institute has certified online instructors who have the expertise and educational qualifications to design and carry out the curriculum. Assessment standards need to be particularly closely monitored in virtual universities. For example, respondents in studies of opinions about online degrees will rate an online degree from Stanford the same as an on-campus degree, because the name of the granting institution is recognized.

== See also ==
- Distance education
- Online degree
- Virtual learning environment
- Virtual school
