= Robert Ubell =

American academic

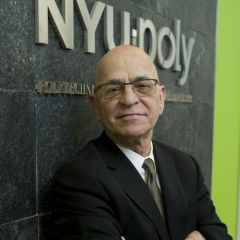
- Nationality: United States
- Fields: Publishing; Online Education
- Residence: New York City
- Education: Brooklyn College; Accademia di Belle Arti di Roma
- Spouse: Rosalyn Deutsche

Robert Ubell is the former Vice Dean of Online Learning at New York University Tandon School of Engineering, where he headed the school's e-learning unit, NYU Tandon Online, formerly known as NYU-ePoly. He is currently Vice Dean Emeritus, Online Learning at NYU Tandon. Under his leadership, NYU Tandon Online has grown in size and stature, achieving more than 10,000 enrollments since it was first launched. Since 2013, US News & World Report has ranked the unit's online engineering graduate program in the top dozen in the nation and in 2015, ranked it as No. 8. In the same year, NYU Tandon Online was the recipient of the Ralph E. Gomory Award for Quality Online Education from the Online Learning Consortium (formerly known as the Sloan Consortium)

== Education ==
Ubell attended Brooklyn College in New York, where he earned a Bachelor of Arts in English Literature in 1961. He pursued studies in studio art, art history, and printmaking at various institutions, including Accademia di Belle Arti di Roma in Rome and Pratt Institute.

== Career ==
=== Publishing Industry ===
Following a period of freelance journalism, publishing articles on science, health and other subjects in New York Magazine, Medical World News, and Today’s Living, among other periodicals, in 1962, he was appointed an editor of Nuclear Industry, published by the Atomic Industrial Forum. Afterwards, he rose through the ranks at Plenum Publishing Corporation, becoming Vice President and Editor-in-Chief in 1970. Subsequently, in 1974, Ubell was appointed editor of The Sciences, published by the New York Academy of Sciences. From 1979 to 1983, he served as the first American Publisher of the noted British science weekly, Nature, where he also launched Nature Biotechnology. In 1984, he founded Robert Ubell Associates, a science, technology and electronic publishing consulting firm with more than 200 clients, including major firms, such as MIT Press, Elsevier, and John Wiley & Sons, among others. From 1993-1996, he served as US president of BioMedNet, Inc., a life sciences website owned by Elsevier. Continuing his work in technical publishing, he joined Marcel Dekker in 1996 as Vice President of New Media. From 1997-1998, Ubell served on the Board of Directors of Marcel Dekker, Inc. In China, he was a member of the Board of Directors of Lianyungang Universal Vehicle Manufacturing Co., Ltd. (2006-8).

=== Online Education ===
In 1999, he joined Stevens Institute of Technology as Dean of Online Learning, where he launched WebCampus Stevens, the school's online learning unit, awarded the Sloan prize as the best online learning program in the country. During his tenure at Stevens, he also served as Dean of the School of Professional Education, where he was head of corporate training and online learning and was also responsible for the university's graduate programs in China. In China, he headed three blended learning master's at Central University of Finance and Economics and Beijing Institute of Technology. In 2009, Ubell joined New York University Tandon School of Engineering as vice president of the school's Enterprise Learning unit, also serving as head of the school's online learning unit. In 2013, he was appointed Vice Dean of Online Learning. In 2013, Ubell was appointed to New York State's Board of Regents online learning task force. He has also served on the Board of the Online Learning Consortium. A member of McGraw-Hill Education's Learning Science Advisory Board, he also serves on the Advisory Board of Online Learning, the journal of the Online Learning Consortium. Ubell also served on the jury of the McGraw Prize. In 2024, he was Senior Editor of CHLOE 9, the ninth annual report on the status of online learning in higher education. Ubell consults for universities and edtech companies, including Coursera, Beacon Education, NYU and The New School, among others.

== Honors and awards ==
Ubell is a recipient of the A. Frank Mayadas Online Learning Leadership Award, the highest honor given to an individual in digital education. In 2011, the Online Learning Consortium (formerly known as the Sloan Consortium) named him among its 2011 Fellows. He is a Council Member of the Chongqing (China) International Exchange Association.

== Publications and other works ==
Ubell is the author of Virtual Teamwork: Mastering the Art and Practice of Online Learning and Corporate Collaboration, published in 2010. He is also the author of the recently published, Staying Online: How to Navigate Digital Education (2022) and Going Online: Perspectives on Digital Learning (2017). He served as executive editor of the Encyclopedia of Climate and Weather, Encyclopedia of Astronomy and Astrophysics, and Linguistics: The Cambridge Survey, among other scholarly reference works. The Encyclopedia of Climate and Weather was awarded the Best PSP Book (1996) by the American Association of Publishers, Professional and Scholarly Division. He is the editor of the multivolume series, Masters of Modern Physics with contributions by several Nobel laureates and other distinguished scientists. Papers from the series are housed at the Center for the History of Physics, Niels Bohr Library & Archives, American Institute of Physics. He is the author or editor of more than 26 books and the author of more than 100 scholarly and general articles. He writes an opinion column on online learning in EdSurge and has contributed to Inside Higher Ed, The Chronicle of Higher Education, IEEE Spectrum, Educause Review, among other periodicals. He is the author of reports on Cuban science and medicine in The New England Journal of Medicine and Nature. Ubell has served on the editorial board of numerous scholarly and other journals, including Online Learning, The Scientist, The Sciences, and others.

== Personal life ==
Ubell lives in Manhattan and is married to the art historian Rosalyn Deutsche, professor at Barnard College, Columbia University. He is the father of two daughters.
