= Online Learning Consortium =

The Online Learning Consortium (OLC) is a collaborative community for those in higher education, including faculty members, administrators, trainers, instructional designers, other learning professionals, educational institutions, professional societies, and corporate enterprises.

The Online Learning Consortium, Inc. is a 501(C)(3) nonprofit organization. OLC hosts conferences, workshops, and programs to help implement and improve online programs; publishes the Online Learning journal (formerly the Journal of Asynchronous Learning Networks, JALN), and conducts research, annual surveys on online and digital learning and forums to inform academic, government and private sector audiences.
