= Christoph Stymmelius =

German theologian and dramatist (1525–1588)

Christophorus Stymmelius
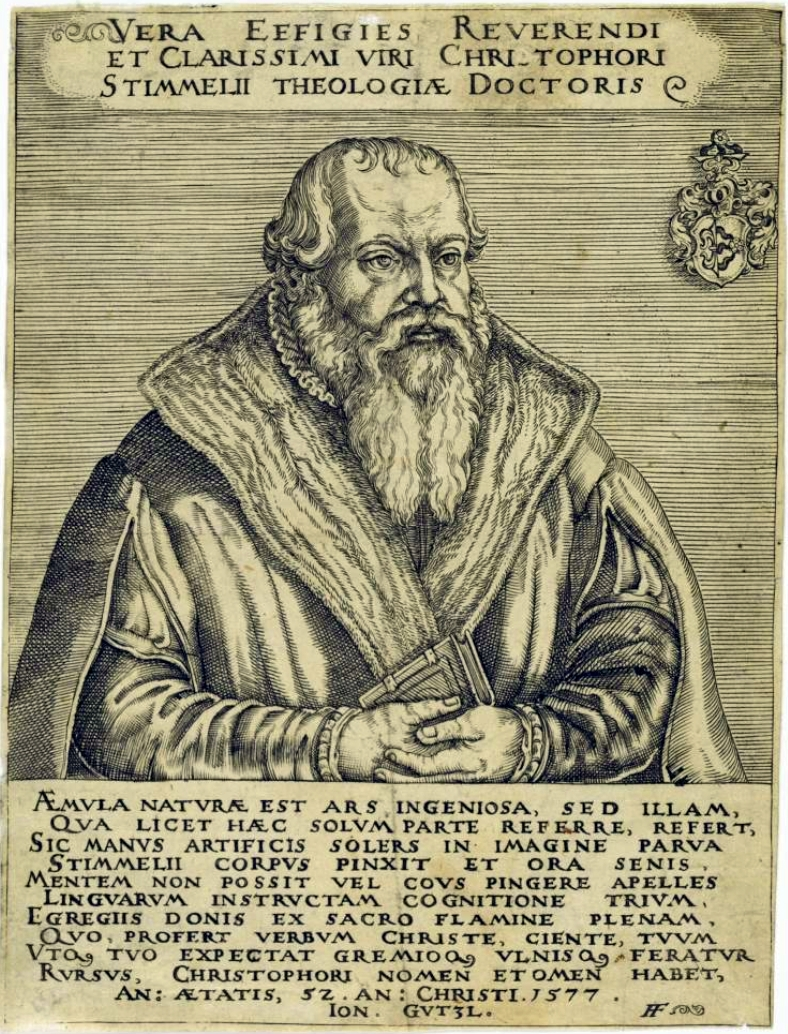
- Christophorus Stimmelius by Frantz Friderich
- Born: Christoph Stummel; 22 October 1525; Frankfurt an der Oder
- Died: 19 February 1588 (aged 62); Stettin
- Occupation(s): Author, Lutheran theologian and Protestant reformer

Christoph[orus] Stymmelius (Latinized for Christoph Stummel; October 22, 1525 in Frankfurt an der Oder – February 19, 1588 in Stettin) was a Neo-Latin dramatist, Lutheran theologian, and general superintendent of Pomerania-Stettin from 1570 to 1572. As a 19-year-old student, Stymmelius wrote Studentes, the first humanistic student comedy in world literature, thus founding a new literary genre.

== Biography ==
Stummel came from a respected family in the city of Frankfurt an der Oder. His father was the wealthy merchant and senator Andreas Stummel. As the universities of the time offered a kind of grammar school education, the 12-year-old Stummel enrolled at the Brandenburg University of Frankfurt (later known as Alma Mater Viadrina) for the winter semester of 1537/38. He attended Latin and Greek lectures by Georg Sabinus, Professor of Poetry and Eloquence and Philipp Melanchthon's son-in-law. Other teachers of his were Christoph Corner and Jodocus Willich, who coined the term Viadrina. As a student at the age of 19, Stummel wrote a play that remained his main work: the comedy Studentes. In 1546, he obtained both at once, a baccalaureus and a master's degree. In 1549, his play Studentes was printed for the first time in the university printing house of Johann Eichorn.

On October 6, 1550, his father Andreas Stummel died of the plague. Stymmelius enrolled at the Lutheran University of Wittenberg (Leucorea) on May 12, 1551, and attended Hebrew lectures by Johann Forster and lectures by Melanchthon. Afterwards, Stymmelius was head of the school in Beeskow and from 1553 court preacher to Count von der Schulenburg in Lübbenau/Spreewald. In 1554, he took on preaching duties in Crossen an der Oder. On October 3, 1555, Stymmelius received his doctorate in theology from the University Viadrina.

== Family ==
Stymmelius was married twice. In the spring of 1554, he married Anna Birck in Crossen an der Oder. On January 10, 1555, his wife died of a stroke following a stillbirth. In the same year, he married Barbara Weidlich (Wedelichia) from Frankfurt. On August 6, 1558, his first-born son Jesaja died of dysentery at the age of almost two. The eldest daughter married Christian, the mayor of Stendal, and the other, Regina, the prepositus Veit Smaler in Penkun (1573).

On September 12, 1597, Sophrosyne Stummel, "daughter of the deceased pastor Dr. Christoph Stymmelius and Barbara Weidlich", married the archdeacon and Hebrew professor Joachim Praetorius from Stettin. The marriage produced three sons, including the later Brandenburg consistorial councillor Joachim Christoph Praetorius, and four daughters, of whom Sophrosyne the younger married the Pomeranian historian, poet and theologian Johannes Micraelius.

== Literary work ==
- Studentes. Comoedia de vita Studiosorum. Frankfurt a. O. am 9. April 1549. (online)
- Disputatio de libero arbitrio. Francoforti ad Viadrum. Ex officina Ioannis Eichorn 1555. (VD16: ZV 11287)
- Kurtzer Unterricht von Wunderwercken, so in Göttlicher Schrifft und andern Historien beschrieben sind. Gedruckt zu Franckfurt an der Oder durch Johann Eichorn Anno MDLXVII (1567).
- Zwo Predigten vom heiligen Abendmal vnsers HERRN vnd Heylands Jhesu Christi. In welchem erkleret wird / was das Abendmal vnd der rechte gebrauch desselben sey. Bekentniß Christophori Stymmelij D. Gedruckt zu Franckfort am Mayn 1576. (VD16: S 9860)
- Comoedia duae: I. ISAAC. De immolatione Isaac. II. STVDENTES. De vita & moribus Studiosorum. Stetini in Officina Andreae Kellneri, Anno 1579. (online)
