= List of Latinised names =

The Latinisation of names in the vernacular was a procedure deemed necessary for the sake of conformity by scribes and authors when incorporating references to such persons in Latin texts. The procedure was used in the era of the Roman Republic and Empire. It was used continuously by the Papacy from the earliest times, in religious tracts and in diplomatic and legal documents. It was used by the early European monasteries. Following the Norman Conquest of England, it was used by the Anglo-Norman clerics and scribes when drawing up charters. Its use was revived in the Renaissance when the new learning was written down in Latin and drew much on the work of Greek, Arabic and other non-Latin ancient authors. Contemporary Italian and European scholars also needed to be Latinised to be quoted in such treatises. The different eras produced their own styles and peculiarities. Sophistication was the trademark of the Renaissance Latinisers. The Anglo-Norman scribes on the other hand were not so learned, and often simply translated the vernacular name into Latin words based on similar sounds, without much effort to make sense or to avoid absurdity, which produced some strange results due to the complexity.

== Coined in the Republican Era ==
- Cassivellaunus (Cassivellaunus, king of the Catuvellauni. The original form is Cassiuellaunos; exists in Welsh as Caswallan)
- Hannō (Various Carthaginians typically known as "Hanno" (after this latinised form) in English and Punic: 𐤇𐤍𐤀 ḥnʾ in Punic)
- Himilco (Himilco, a Carthaginian explorer)
- Lars Tolumnius (Larth Tulumnes)

== Coined in era of Imperial Rome ==
- Arminius (*Irminaz)
- Boudicca (Boudica)
- Iōsēphus (various Jews named Yosef, particularly Yosef ben Matityahu, better known as Flavius Josephus)
- Iēsūs, Iesus Nazarenus, Iesus Christus (Yĕhošūa‘)
- Elagabalus (Varius Avitus Bassianus, after god Elagabal)

== Coined in the Early Middle Ages ==
- Alphonsus (various rulers named Alfonso)
- Audulfus (Audulf)
- Augustinus Cantuariensis (Augustine of Canterbury)
- Baldimer (Vladimir of Bulgaria)
- Brocanus (Brychan)
- Brocardus (Burchard)
- Caecilius (Aksel)
- Chlodovechus (Clodovech Frankish King, also known as Clovis I)
- Carolus Magnus (Karl)
- Ecgberhtus Episcopus (Ecgbert of York)
- Guorthigirnus or Guorthegirnus (Vortigern)
- Hengistus or Hencgistus (Hengist)
- Hludowicus Pius (Louis the Pious)
- Hubertus (Hubert of Liège)
- Mahomet or Mahometus (Muhammad)
- Moses Maimonides (Moshe ben Maimon)
- Maglocunus, Mailcunus (Maelgwn Gwynedd)
- Odoacer (Audawakrs)
- Reginherus (Ragnarr Lothbrók)

== Coined in the High Middle Ages ==
- Anselmus Cantuariensis (Anselmo d'Aosta)
- Guido Aretinus (Guido d'Arezzo)
- Galfridus Monemutensis, Gaufridus, Galfridus Arturus, Gaufridus de Monemuta (Geoffrey of Monmouth, Welsh: Gruffudd ap Arthur)
- Walter(us) Archidiacanus (Walter, Archdeacon of Oxford)
- Guenhuuera, Ganhumara, Ganhumera (Queen Guinevere, Welsh: Gwenhwyfar ferch Ogrfan Gawr)

== Coined in the Late Middle Ages ==
- Thomas Aquinas (Tommaso d'Aquino)
- Duns Scotus (John Duns)

== Coined in the Renaissance and onwards ==
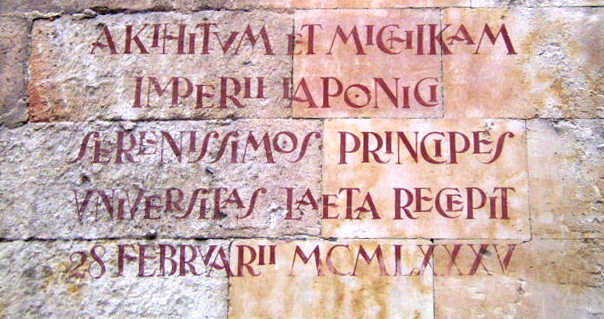
The University of Salamanca translated the name of the Japanese princes Akihito and Michiko as Akihitus and Michika for their 1985 visit.

- Abulcasis (Abu al-Qasim al-Zahrawi)
- Gustavus II Adolphus (Gustav II Adolf)
- Leo Africanus (Al-Hassan al-Wazzan al-Fasi)
- Alexander Agricola (Alexander Ackerman)
- Georgius Agricola (Georg Pawer)
- Albatenius (Muhammad ibn Jābir al-Harrānī al-Battānī)
- Aldus Manutius (Aldo Manuzio)
- Algoritmi (Muhammad ibn Mūsā al-Khwārizmī)
- Alhacen (Abū ʿAlī al-Ḥasan ibn al-Ḥasan ibn al-Haytham)
- Alpetragius (Nur ed-Din al-Betrugi)
- Abunaser Alpharabius (Abū Nasr Muhammad ibn al-Farakh al-Fārābi)
- Amadeus Avogadro (Amedeo Avogadro)
- Americus Vespucius (Amerigo Vespucci)
- Petrus Apianus (Peter Apian)
- Jacobus Arminius (Jacob Harmenszoon)
- Aruj (Oruç Reis)
- Arzachel (Abū Ishāq Ibrāhīm al-Zarqālī)
- Avempace (Ibn Bajjah)
- Avenzoar (Ibn Zuhr)
- Averroes (Ibn Rushd)
- Avicenna (Ibn Sina Abū ‘Alī al-Husayn)
- Azophi (Abd al-Rahman al-Sufi)
- Johannes Balbus (Giovanni Balbi)
- Barbarossa (Barbaros Hayrettin)
- Caspar Barlaeus (Caspar van Baerle)
- Benedictus de Spinoza (Baruch Spinoza)
- Hermann Bonnus (Hermann von Bunne)
- Carolus Borromeus (Carlo Borromeo)
- Hieronymus Bosch (Jeroen Bosch)
- Calid (Khalid ibn Yazid)
- Georgius Calixtus (Georg Callisen)
- Camellus (Georg Joseph Kamel)
- (de) Candia ( "of Crete")

Pedro de Candia
Gaulterio de Candia
Peter of Candia

- Hieronymus Cardanus (Gerolamo Cardano)
- Renatus Cartesius (René Descartes)
- Conrad Celtes (Conrad Pickel)
- Aelius Lampridius Cervinus (Ilija Crijević or Elio Lampridio Cerva)
- Clavius (Christoph Clau or Klau)
- Johannes Coccejus (Johannes Koch)
- Iohannes Cochanovius (Jan Kochanowski)
- Christophorus Columbus (Cristòffa Cómbo/Cristoforo Colombo)
- Iohannes Comenius (Jan Amos Komenský)
- Confucius (Kong Fuzi)
- Nicolaus Copernicus (Niklas Koppernigk)
- Laurentius Corvinus (Lorenz Rabe)
- Gerardus Cremonensis (Gerardo da Cremona)
- Nicolaus Cusanus (Nikolaus von Kues)
- Dreses (Muhammad al-Idrisi)
- Desiderius Erasmus (Gerrit Gerritszoon)
- Thomas Erastus (Thomas Lieber or Lüber)
- Thomas Erpenius (Thomas van Erpe)
- Leonhardus Eulerus (Leonhard Euler)
- Eustachius (Bartolomeo Eustachi)
- Hieronymus Fabricius (Girolamo Fabrizi)
- Fallopius (Gabriele Falloppio)
- Marsilius Ficinus (Marsilio Ficino)
- Armen Firman (Abbas ibn Firnas)
- Hieronymus Fracastorius (Girolamo Fracastoro)
- Iohannes Freinsheimius (Johann Freinsheim)
- Gemma Frisius (Jemme Reinerszoon)
- Nikolaus Gallus (Nikolaus Hahn)
- Siddarthus Gautamus (Siddhārtha Gautama, Buddha)
- Geber (Jābir ibn Hayyān)
- Geber (Jabir ibn Aflah)
- Gersonides (Levi ben Gershom)
- Hugo Grotius (Huig de Groot or Hugo de Groot)
- Joseph Guarnerius (Giuseppe Guarneri)
- Johannes Hevelius (Johannes Hewelcke)
- Jodocus Hondius (Joost de Hondt)
- Christianus Hugenius (Christiaan Huygens)
- Martinus Hylacomylus or Ilacomilus (Martin Waldseemüller)
- Cornelius Iansenius (Cornelius Jansen)
- Iohannes Iessenius (János Jeszenszky or Ján Jesenský)
- Ignatius de Loyola (Iñigo López de Oñaz y Loyola)
- Jacobus de Cessolis (Jacopo da Cessole)
- Jesu Occulist (Ali Ibn Isa)
- Johannes Antonius Scopoli (Giovanni Antonio Scopoli)
- Johannitius (Hunayn ibn Ishaq)
- Iohannes Keplerus (Johannes Kepler)
- John Caius (John Keys)
- Laocius (Lao Zi)
- Orlandus Lassus (Orlande de Lassus or Orlando di Lasso)
- Aloysius Lilius (Luigi Giglio)
- Carolus Linnaeus (Carl Linnaeus)
- Iustus Lipsius (Joost Lips)
- Georgius Macropedius (Joris van Lanckvelt)
- Magellanus (Fernão de Magalhães)
- Simon Marius (Simon Mayr)
- Mencius (Meng Zi)
- Gerardus Mercator (Gheert Cremer or Gerard de Cremer)
- Morinus (Jean-Baptiste Morin)
- Joannes Morinus (Jean Morin)
- Thomas Morus (Thomas More)
- Ben Mousa (Banū Mūsā)
- Andreas Musculus (Andreas Meusel)
- Aelius Antonius Nebrissensis (Antonio Martínez de Cala)
- Isaacus Newtonus (Isaac Newton)
- Nostradamus (Michel de Nostredame)
- Occhiali (Kılıç Ali)
- Abraham Ortelius (Abraham Ortels or Hortels)
- Ianus Pannonius (János Csezmicei or Ivan Česmički)
- Philippus Theophrastus Aureolus Bombastus von Hohenheim; Paracelsus (Phillip von Hohenheim)
- Pierius Magnus (Pier Gerlofs Donia)
- Franciscus Patricius (Frane Petrić/Petris/Petrišević, Francesco Patrizi da Cherso)
- Johannes Piscator (Johannes Fischer)
- Petrus Plancius (Pieter Platevoet )
- Purbachius (Georg von Peuerbach)
- Petrus Ramus (Pierre de La Ramée)
- Regiomontanus (Johannes Müller von Königsberg)
- Johannes Rhodius (Hinne Rode)
- Andreas Rivetus (André Rivet)
- Antonius Maria Schyrleus de Rheita (Antonín Maria Šírek z Reity)
- Michael Servetus (Miguel Serveto)
- Carolus Sigonius (Carlo Sigonio or Sigone)
- Willibrordus Snellius (Willibrord Snel)
- Socinus (Lelio Sozzini)
- Faustus Socinus (Fausto Paolo Sozzini)
- Johannes Stadius (Jan Van Ostaeyen or Jean Stade)
- Nicolaus Stenonis (Niels Steensen)
- Simon Stevinus (Simon Stevin)
- Antonius Stradivarius (Antonio Stradivari)
- Christophorus Stymmelius (Christoph Stummel)
- Actius Syncerus (Jacopo Sannazaro)
- Abubacer Aben Tofail (Abu Bakr Muhammad ibn Abd al-Malik ibn Muhammad ibn Tufail)
- Tusi (Nasīr al-Dīn al-Tūsī)
- Tycho Brahe (Tyge Ottesen Brahe)
- Jacobus Tillaeus (Jacques Cappel)
- Guido Ubaldus (Guidobaldo del Monte)
- Zacharias Ursinus (Zacharias Baer)
- Andreas Vesalius (Andries van Wesel)
- Maius Vestricius, (Latinised form of Oscan "Maíúí Vestirikíúí" used in some translations of the Cippus Abellanus)
- Gisbertus Voetius (Gijsbert Voet)

== Humanist names with Latin and Greek elements ==
In central European circles of academia and ecclesial writers, a specific practice of Latinisation arose during the 15th century with the rediscovery of ancient literature. Thereby writers would seek connection to the ancient writers by taking up surnames or international pen names. We encounter names that follow naming conventions of those ancient languages, especially Latin and Greek, so the occasional Greek names for the same function are also included here.

Especially in the German-speaking regions the use of a “Humanistenname” or “Gelehrtenname” was common for many an academic, cleric, and secular administrative who wished to ascend in societal rank. The other region where the practice became equally common was 1600s Scandinavia and the Swedish Baltic colonies where this practice was called 'lärda namn' or 'humanistnamn'. Further reasons for assuming such internationally recognisable names, especially in Scandinavia, included leaving agrarian conditions behind and embracing an urban and cosmopolitan way of life. Some academics never had a surname nor a patronymic surname as per their region of origin. However, academics came to Central European universities from all corners of Europe, with surnames from rare languages, so clarity in distinguishing students was necessary. Some Latinizations and Grecizations are exact vernacular translations of profession surnames or dwelling names, but others seem to bear no known connection or resemblance. Humanist names reached varying degrees of stability and heritability, and some exist to this day.

Recent articles and dissertation by Daniel Kroiß have systematically categorized the origin of Humanist names and their declension patterns in the German and Dutch speaking regions. Some humanist names derived from common professions as replacements of the vernacular term, and were found throughout Central European university cities. They included:

- Abiectarius (Carpenter, e.g. “Schreiner”)
- Actuarius (scribe professions, e.g. “Schreiber”)
- Agricola (Farmer, e.g. “Bauer”)
- Aurifaber (Goldsmith)
- Braseator (Brewer, e.g. “Brauer”)
- Campanus (Clockmaker)
- latinized Chytraeus or grecisized Obsopoeus (Cook, e.g. “Koch)
- Institor (Teacher)
- Iudex (Judge)
- Mercator (most merchant professions)
- Molitor (Miller, e.g. “Müller”)
- Olearius (Oilmaker, e.g. “Ölmüller”)
- Pannifex (Cloth-maker, e.g. “Weber”)
- Pellifex (Skinner)
- Piscator (Fisher)
- Praetorius (Watchman)
- Rotifex (Wheeler)
- Tectander or Xilotectus (Carpenter, e.g. “Zimmermann”)

Some humanist surnames that were not clearly based on profession or location included:

- Argillander (argillos – white clay)
- Cajander (kaiuos – new)
- Colliander (koloios – jackdaw)
- Creander (kriós – ram, stag)
- Domander (dómos – house)
- Gallus (rooster)
- Kellander (kelaiuos – black)
- Levander (leuo – stone)
- Lupus (wolf, e.g. “Wulff”)
- Melanchthon (“Schwartzerdt”)
- Neander (neos – new, e.g. “Neumann”)
- Nikander (nike – victory)
- Oinotomos (“Schneidewein”)
- Picander (píkros – sharp)
- Polviander (possibly from polus – many)
- Silander (silouros – shadfish)
- Valiander, Wallander (ualos – glass)

== Other sources of English Latinized names ==
The Complete Peerage (1913) states concerning the Latinization of English names: "When a clerk had to render a name in a charter he usually sought for the nearest Latin equivalent, sometimes took a correct one, as "de Bello Campo" for "Beauchamp"; sometimes a grotesque one". The latter refers to the mediaeval Anglo-Norman family of Orescuilz, which held amongst others the Somersetshire manor of Sandford Orcas (named after it), whose surname was Latinised as de Aureis Testiculis, from French "Couilles d'Or".

=== Andrew Wright ===
A list of "Latin forms of English surnames" is included as an appendix in Andrew Wright's Court Hand Restored, or the Student's Assistant in reading Old Deeds, Charters, Records, etc., published in 9 editions up to 1879.

=== Charles Trice Martin ===
In 1910 Charles Trice Martin expanded on Wright's list (the 9th edition of which he had edited) in his The Record Interpreter: a collection of abbreviations, Latin words and names used in English historical manuscripts and records which included a chapter "Latin forms of English Surnames". He acknowledged in compiling his list the assistance of an anonymous work The Norman People and their Existing Descendants (London, 1874). In the preface, p. xi, Martin stated of that chapter: "Many of the [place names and] surnames have been found in classes of records which contain documents in both languages referring to the same case, like the Chancery Proceedings, in which bills and answers are in English and writs in Latin."

Martin stated that some of the Latin names were "due to the ingenuity" of officials and clerks inserting what they thought would be a translation of an English name, being ignorant of its real meaning and history. This led to spurious translations such as Ventus Morbidus (literally "sick wind") for the place name 'Windsor', and de Umbrosa Quercu (literally "from the shady oak") for the surname 'Dimock'. He went on to say that the list includes many names collected from Latin inscriptions on brasses, tombstones, and other monuments, many of them dating to the sixteenth century and later, and said that he had supplied the English equivalents of these from other sources of information.

- ABA – Abbott
- de ABBACIA – Abbess; Dabbs
- de ABBANEIO – Abney
- ABBAS – Abbott
- de ABRINCIS – D'Avranches; Avranches
- ACUTUS – Hawkwood
- de ADURNI PORTU – Etherington
- de AGNELLIS – Agnew; Dagnall
- de AGNIS – Aisnes; Ains
- de AILLIO – D'Aile; Alley
- ALA CAMPI – Wingfield
- de ALBA MARA; de ALBA MARLA – Albemarle; Aumarle
- de ALBINEIO – D'Aubeney; Albiney; Albeney
- ALBERICUS; ALBREA; ALBRAEUS – Awbrey
- de ALBINEIO; ALBINIACO – D'Aubeney; Albiney; Dolben
- de ALBO MONASTERIO – Blancmuster; Whitchurch
- ALBUS – White
- de ALDEDELEGA; de ALDITHELEGA; ALDITHELEIA – Audley
- ALEC – Herring
- de ALEMANIA – Dalmaine
- ALEMANNICUS – Allman
- ALESIUS – Alane
- de ALNETO – Dawnay; Dannay; Dennett
- de ALNO – Daunay
- ALSELINUS – Ansell; Ancell
- de ALTA RIVA; de ALTA RIPA – de Hauterive; *Dawtrey; Daltry; Hawtrey
- de ALTA VILLA – De Hauteville
- de ALTA MENILLO – de Hautmesnil
- de AMBLIA – De Amblie; Hamley
- ANASTASIUS – Anstis
- de ANCARIIS – Dancer
- de andeuvilla – Hanwell
- ANGLICUS -Inglis; England
- de ANGULIS – Angell
- de ANGULO – del Angle; atte Cornere.
- in ANGULO – atte Noke
- de ANSA – Daunce
- de APIBUS – Bee; Bye (?)
- APOTECARIUS -Lespicer; Spicer
- APPARITOR – Sumner
- de AQUA BLANCA – Egeblaunch; Aygueblanche
- de AQUA FRISCA – Freshwater
- AQUAPONTANUS – Bridgwater
- De AQUILA – Eagle; D'Eagles; Diggles
- Arbalistarius – Arblaster; Alabaster
- ARCHIDIACONUS – Archdeacon; Arcedeckne
- de ARCHIS; ARCIS – D'Arques; Arch; Dark
- de ARELA – Harela; Argles
- ARCUARIUS – Archer; Larcher
- de ARCUSBUS – de Arches; Bowes
- De ARENIS – Darens; Darayns; Sandes
- de ARGENTOMO – Argetoune
- de ARIDA VILLA – Dryton; Dryden
- de ARIETE – Herriott
- ARMIGER – Arminger
- de ARMIS – Harms; Armes
- ARUNDELIUS – Arundel
- ASCELINUS – Ansell; Ancell
- ASCULPHUS – Ayscough; Askew
- de ASNERIIS – Daniers; Denyer
- de ATRIO – Hall
- de AUBEMARA – Albemarle
- AUBERICUS – Awbrey
- de AUCO; DE AUCA – Owe
- de AUGO – D'Eu; Auge; Agg; Dagg
- AUGUSTINUS – Austin; Hotine
- de AULA – Hall (See also de HAULA)
- Ad AULAM – atte Halle; Hall
- AUONIUS – Of Northampton
- de AUREA VALLE – Dorival; Dorvell; Darvall
- de AUREIS TESTICULIS – Orescuilz
- de AUREO VADO – Goldford or Guldeford
- AURIFABER – Orfeur, an ancient name in *Cumberland
- de AURILLA – Overall
- de AUTHIERO – d'Authier, Dauthier
- de AUTRICO – d'Auxerre; Oxier
- de AYNECURIA – Daincourt; Deyncourt
- de BA; BAA; BAHA – Baugh
- BACCHUS – Backhouse
- de BADA – Bath
- de BAILOLIO – Baliol
- de BAJOCIS – de Bayeux; Bews; Baines
- de ABLLIO – Bailey
- cum BARBA – Witheberd; Beard
- BARBATUS – Barbet; Barbey
- BARDULFUS – Bardolph (Stoke Bardolph, Stow Bardolph)
- de BARRA – de la Barre; de Barre
- BARRARIUS – Le Barrer; Le Barrier
- de BATONIA – Bath
- de BAUDRIBOSCO – Boldrewood
- de BEEUILLA – Beville; Beavill
- de BELESMO – de Belesme
- de BELLA AQUA – de Bealeawe; Bellew
- de BELLA CAMERA – Belchambers
- de BELLA FAGO – de Bealfo; Beaufoe; Belfou
- de BELLA FIDE – de Beaufoy
- de BELLA VILLA – Belville
- de BELLO ALNETO – Bellany
- de BELLO CAMPO – de Belcamp; Beauchamp
- de BELLO CAPITE – Beauchief
- de BELLA FOCO – Beaufeu
- de BELLO LOCO – Beaulieu; Bewley; Bowley
- de BELLO MANSO – Beaumains; Beaumeis
- de BELLO MARISCO – Beaumarsh
- de BELLO MONTE – Beaumont
- de BELLO PORTU – de Baupere
- de BELLO PRATO – de Beaupre
- de BELLO SITU – Bellasis
- de BELLO VERO – de Beuvar; Beauver
- de BELLO VISTO – Belvoir
- de BELLO VISU – de Beauvise; Bevers
- BENIDICTUS – Bennett
- de BENEFACTIS – Benfield
- BENEUOLIS – Benlows
- BERCARIUS – Le Bercher; Barker
- BERCATOR – Barker
- BERENGARIUS – Barringer
- de Bereuilla – de Berville; Burfield; Berewell
- de BERNERIIS – Berners
- de BEUERLACO – Beverley
- BITURICENSIS – de Bourges
- de BLANCO PANE – Whitbread
- de BLAUIA – de Blaye
- de BLITHODUNO – Blyton
- de BLOSSEUILLA; BLOSTEUILLA – Bloville; Blofield
- de BLOYS – Blew; Bligh
- de BLUNDEUILLA – Blundeville; Blomfield; Bloomfield
- BLUNDUS – Le Blond; Blundel; Blount. (Feminine is Blunda)
- de BOCEO – de Bocy
- de BOAUILLA – Bovill
- de BOLOGNA – Bullen
- de BONA VILLA – Bonville
- de BONO DASSATO – Goodrick
- BONOIUS – Boleyn
- de BOONIA – de Bohun
- de BORGEIS – Burges
- BORLASIUS – Borlace
- de BASCO – Boys; Boyce; Busk; Wood
- de BOSCO ARSO – Brentwood
- de BOSCO – Borhard
- de BOSEUILLA – Boswell
- de Botellis – Butler
- de BOTERELLIS – Botreaux'Bottrel
- de BOULARIA – de Bollers; Buller
- de BOUIS VILLA – Bovill
- de BRAIOSA – de Braose; Brewis; Brewhouse
- BRITO – Le Bretun
- de BROILLEIO – de Bruilly; Briley
- de BRUERIA – Bryer; Briewer; Brewer
- BRUNELLI – Burnell
- BRUNUS – Le Brun; Brown
- de BUCCA – Buck
- de BUCCA UNCTA – de Bouchaine; Buccointe; Budgen
- de BUCIS – de Buces; Bouche; Bush
- BUDELLUS – de Buelles; Boyle
- de BUESUILA – *Bouville; Bousville; Boseville; Bousfield
- de BULEMARA – Bulmer
- de BULIACO – Buisly; Builly
- de BURCO – de Burgh
- BURGENSIS – Burges
- de BURGO – de Burgh; Burke; Bourke
- de BURGO CHARO – Bourchier
- BURGUNDIENSIS – de Bourgogne; Bourgoyne; Burgon
- de BURNAUILLA – Bernwell; Barnwell
- de BURTANA – Burton
- de BUSSA VILLA – de *Boseville; Beuzeville; Boscherville
- de CABANISIO – de Chalbeneys
- de CADOMO – de Caen; Caine
- de CADURCIS – de Chaorces; Chaworth
- CÆCILIUS – Cecil
- de CAHAGNIS; CAHANNIS – Keynes; Keine; Cain
- de CAINETO; de CAISNETO; CAINNETO – DE *Quesnay; Chainei; Keynes {?}:Cheyne
- CALCEARIUS; Le Chaucier; Chaucer
- CALIXTUS – Killick
- de CALLEIO – de Cailly; Cayley
- CALUINUS – Caffyn; Chaffyn
- de CALUO MONTE – Chaumond
- CALUUS – Baud; Bald; Café; Calf; Valver; Callow
- de CAMERA – Chambers
- de CAMERACO – Gomery
- CAMERARIUS – Chamberlayne
- de CAMPANIA – de Champaigne; Champneys
- CAMPARNULPHUS; de CAMPO ARNULPHUS – Champernoun
- de CAMPIS – Descamps; Kemp
- de CAMPO AUENE – Campdaveine; Otfield
- de CAMPO BELLO – Campbell
- de CAMPO FLORIDO; FLORUM – Champfleur
- de CAMUILLA – Camvil
- de CANCEIO – Chauncey
- de CANCELLIS – Chaunceus
- de CANETO – Cheyney
- de CANIUETO – Knevitt; Knyvett
- CANONICUS – Le Chanoin; Cannon
- de CANTILUPO – de Cantelou; Cauntelow; Cantlow or Cantello
- CANTOR – Le Chaunter; Singer
- de CANUILLA – Camville
- de CAPELLA – Capel
- CAPELLANUS – Caplin; Chaplin
- de CAPIS – de Chappes; Cope; Capes
- CAPITO – rostete; GrosseTeste; Grosthead; Grouthead
- CAPRA – Chevre
- de CAPRA – de la Chievre; Cheevers; Chivers
- de CAPREOLO – Roebuck
- de CAPREOLOCURIA; de CAPRICURIA – Chevercourt
- CARACTACUS – Craddock
- CARADOCUS – Caradock; Cradock
- CARBONARIUS – Carbonel
- CARETARIUS – Carter
- de CARILOCO – Cherlewe
- de CARISIO – de Cerisy
- CARNOTENSIS – de Chartres
- de CARNOTTO – de Carnoth or Crennach
- de CARO LOCO – Carelieu
- de CASA DEI – Godshall
- de CASINETO; Casneto – See CAINETO
- CASTELLANUS – Catlin
- de CASTELLIS – de Chasteus
- de CASTELLO – de Chastell; Castle; Castell; Chatto
- de CASTELLO MAGNO – Castlemain
- CASTOR – Bever
- de CASTRO – Castell
- de CASTOR NOUO – de Castelnau
- de CATHEREGE – Catherick; Cartwright
- de CAUO MONTE – de Caumont; de Chaumont
- CECUS – Cheke
- CENOMANNICUS – Maine
- de CERASO; de CERICIO – de Cerisy; Cherry
- de CCESTRIA – Chester
- de CHAHAIGNIS – See de CAHAGNIS
- de CHAISNETO – See de CAINETO
- de CHALUENNIO – ce Clavigny; Clabone
- de CHAMPELLIS/CAMPELLIS – de Champeaux (e.g.William of Champeaux)
- de CHAORIS; CHAURCIS; De CHAUWURCIS – Chaworth
- CHELIGREUUS – Killigrew
- CHENESIS – Chaigne; Le Chesne; Cheyney
- CHENTICUS – Kentish
- de CHESNETO – See de CAINETO
- de CHEURIIS – de Chevrieres; Chaffers
- CHIRCHEBEIUS – Kirby; Kirby
- de CHRISTI ECCLESIA – de Crissechirche; de *Christecherche
- CINOMANNICUS – Maine
- de CLARA VILLA – Clareville
- CLARANUS – Clare
- de CLARIFAGO – Clerfay
- de CLARIS VALLIBUS – Clerevaux; Clarival
- de CLARO FAGETO – Clerfay
- de CLARO MONTE – Clermont; Clermund
- CLAVIGER – Clavinger
- de CLAVILLA – de Claville; Cleville
- de CLAUSO – Close; Class
- CLERICUS – Clarke; Cleary
- de CLINTONA – Clinton
- de CLIUO FORTI – Clifford
- de COARDA – de Cowert; Coward
- COCUS – Cook; Coke; Cocks
- de CODRIA – Cowdry
- de COISNERIIS – de Coiners
- de COLAUILLA – Colville
- de COLDRETO – de Coudray
- COLLINUS – Knollys
- de COLLO MEDIO – de Colmieu
- de COLUMBARIIS – Columbers
- de CONCHIS – Shelley
- de CONDUCTU – Chenduit
- de CONIGERIIS; CONNERIIS- de Coignieres; Conyers
- CONSTABULARIUS – le Cunestable; Constable
- CORBALDUS – Corbould
- de CORCELLA – Churchill
- de CORMELIIS – de Cormayles; Cormie
- de CORNIOLA – Cornell
- de CORNIBIA – Cornwayle
- CORNTUS – Horn
- CORUESARIUS – Corveser; Corsar
- de CORUO SPINÆ – Crowthorn
- de CRAMAUILLA – Cranwell
- CRASSUS – Le Gros; See also "Grassus"
- de CRAUCUMBA – Crowcombe
- de CREAUSO – de Grandson; Grandison
- de CREPITO CORDE – Crevecœur; Crowcour
- de CRIWA – Crewe
- CROCUS – Croke
- de CROTIS – Croot; Grote
- de CRUCE – Cross
- CRUCIARIUS – Crocker
- de CUILLIO – Colley
- CULLUS de BOUE – Oxenstern
- de CUMINIS – Comyn
- CUNETIUS – Kennett
- de CURCEO; CURCI – de Courcy
- de CURIA – Delacour; Cure
- de CURLEIO – Curley
- de CURUA SPINA – Crowthorn
- de CUSANCIA – Cussans
- DACUS – Le Daneis, Denys, Dennis. (Adjectival form of mediaeval-Latin Dacia, Denmark, thus "The Dane")
- DAINCURIENSIS; de AYNECURIA – Daincourt; Deyncourt
- DALENRIGIUS – Dalegrig
- DANISCUS – Dennis
- DAUTHIERUS – Dauthier, d'Authier
- de DAVIDUILLA – D'Aville; D'Eyville
- DECANUS – Dean
- DEUON' – Le Deveneis; Devenish
- DIABOLUS – Dayville; De Eyville; Deeble; Dibble
- de DICETO – de Disci; Diss
- DISPENSARIUS; DISPENSATOR; DISPENSERIUS – Le *Despenser; Spencer
- de DIUA – Dive; Dives; Deaves
- DIUITIUS- Riche
- DODERIGUS – Dodderidge
- de DOITO – Dwight; Brook
- de DOUERA – de Douvres; Dover
- DRACO – Drake; Drage
- de DROCIS – de Dreux; Drew
- DROGO – Drewe
- DUCHTIUS – Doughty
- de DUMOUILLA – Domville; Dunville
- de DUNA – Don; Down
- de DUNSETANUILLA – Dunstanvill
- DURANDUS – Durrant, Durand
- DURIDENTIS – Duredens; Durdana
- DUTENTIUS – Doughty
- DUX – Ducy; Duck; Duke
- EASTERLINGUS – Stradling
- de EBROICUS; de EBROIS – D'Évreux
- ECCLESIENSIS – Churche
- ELISEUS – Ellis
- ELYOTA – Elliott
- de ERICETO – Briewer
- de ERM´ENOLDA VILLA – d'Ermenonville
- de ERMENTERIIS – Darmenters
- ERNALDUS – Ernaut; Arnold
- de EROLICTO – Erliche
- de ESCALERIIS – de Escales; Scalers; Scales
- de ESCARDEUILLA – Scarvell
- de Escouilla – Escoville; Schofield; Scovel
- de ESCRUPA – Le Scrope; Scrope
- ESPERUERIUS – Le Sperver; Sparver
- de ESSARTIS – Essart; Sart
- de Esseleia – Ashley
- de ESTLEGA; ESTLEIA – Astley or Estley
- EUDO – Eade; Eades
- EXTRANEUS; de EXTRANEO – L'Estrange; Strange
- FABER – Lefevre
- FACETUS -Le Facet
- de FAGO – Beech; Beecher; Fagge
- de FAIA – de Fai; Fay
- FALCONARIUS – Falkner; Fachney
- FALKASIUS – Fawkes
- FALTERELLUS – Futerel; Fewtrell
- FANTASMA – Fantosme
- FAUCUS – Folkes; Vaux
- FAUKESIUS – Fawkes
- FERCHARDUS – Farquahr; Forker
- FERDINANDUS – Farrant
- FERRARRII – Ferre
- de FERRARIIS – Ferrars; Ferrier
- FERRATUS – Fairy; Ferrie
- FIBER – Bever
- FIEREBRACHIUS – Ferbras
- de FIERUILLA – Fierville; Fairfield
- de Ffiliceto – Fernham
- FILIUS ADELINI – Fitz-Adelin; Edlin
- FILIUS ALANI – Fitz-Alan
- FILIUS ALUREDI – Fitz-Alard; Fitz-Alfred
- FILIUS AMANDI – Fitz-Amand
- FILIUS ANDREÆ – Fitz-andrew
- FILIUS BALDEWINI – Baldwin; Bolderson; Bowdon
- FILIUS BALDRICI – Baldrey
- FILIUS BERNARDI – Fitz-Bernard
- FILIUS BRICIIS – Bryson
- FILIUS BOGONIS – Bewes
- FILIUS BRIANI – Fitz-Brian
- FILIUS COCI – Cookson
- FILIUS COMITIS – Fitz-Count
- FILIUS DAUIDIS – Dawson
- FILIUS DRACONIS – Drake
- FILIUS DRAGONIS – Drewes; Drew
- FILIUS EDMUNDI – Edmunds
- FILIUS EUSTACHII – Fitz-Eustace
- FILIUS FULCONIS – Fitz-Fulk; Faulke
- FILIUS GALFRIDI – Fits-Geoffry
- FILIUS GERARDI – Fitz-Gerrard
- FILIUS GILLEBERTI – Fitz-Gilbert
- FILIUS GODESCALLI – Godshall
- FILIUS GUALTERI – Fitzwalter; Walters
- FILIUS GUARINI – Fitz-Warren
- FILIUS GUIDONIS – Fitz-Guy; Fitzwith
- FILIUS GULIELMI – Fitz-*William; Williamson; Williams
- FILIUS HAMONIS – Fitz-Hamon; Hammond; Hampson
- FILIUS HARDINGI – Fitz-Hardinge
- FILIUS HENRICI – Fitz-Henry; Harrison; Harris
- FILIUS HERBERTI – Fitz-Herberti
- FILIUS HUGONIS – Fitz-*Hugh; Hughes; Hewes; Hewish; Hewson
- FILIUS HUMFREDI – Fitz-Humphrey; Humphreys
- FILIUS IBOTÆ – Ibbottson; Ebison
- FILIUS ISAAC – Isaacs; Higgins; Higginson; Hickson
- FILIUS JACOBI – Fitz-James; Jameson
- FILIUS JOHANNIS – Fitz-John; Johnson; Jones
- FILIUS KATERINA – Katlyson; Cattlin
- FILIUS LAURENTII – Lawson
- FILIUS LETITIÆ – Lettson
- FILIUS LUCÆ – Fitz-Lucas
- FILIUS LUCIÆ – Lucy
- FILIUS MAURICII – Fitz-Maurice; Morison
- FILIUS MICHAELIS – Fitz-Michael
- FILIUS NICOLAI – Fitz-Nichol; Nicholson; Nichols
- FILIUS ODONIS – Fitz-Otes
- FILIUS OLIUERI – Fitz-Oliver
- FILIUS OSBURNI – Fitz-Osburn
- FILIUS OSMONDI – Fitz-Osmond
- FILIUS OTHONIS or OTTONIS – Fitz-Otes
- FILIUS PAGANI – Fitz-Pain
- FILIUS PATRICII – Fitz-Patrick
- FILIUS PETRI – Fitz Peter; Peterson; Peters
- FILIUS PHILIPPI – Phillips; Phipps; Phipson
- FILIUS RADULFI – Fitz-Ralph; Raphson
- FILIUS REGINALDI – Fitz-Raynold; Reynolds
- FILIUS RICARDI – Fitz-*Richard; Richardson; Richards
- FILIUS ROBERTI – Fitz-*Robert; Robertson; Roberts; Robinson
- FILIUS ROGERI – Fitz-Rogers; Rogerson; Rogers
- FILIUS SAHERI – Searson
- FILIUS SIMONIS – Fitz-Simon; Simonds
- FILIUS STEPHANI – Fitz-*Stephen; Stephenson; Stephens; Stiffin
- FILIUS SUANI – Swainson
- FILIUS THOME – Fitz-Thomas; Thompson
- FILIUS VIDUÆ – Widdowson
- FILIUS WALTERI – Fitz-walter; Walters; Waters; Watson; Watts
- FILIUS WARINI – Fitz-Warin-Warisno
- de FIRMITATE – de la Ferté
- de FLAMMAUILLA – de Flamville
- FLANDRENSIS – Flemyng
- FLAUILLUS – Flavell
- FLAUUS – Blund; Blount; Fleuez
- FLECHARIUS – Le Flechier; Fletcher
- FLORUS – Flowers
- de FLUCTIBUS – Flood
- de FOLIA – Foley
- de FOLIIS – Foulis
- de FONTE – Font; Faunt
- de FONTE AUSTRALI – Southwell
- de FONTE EBRALDI – Fontevraud
- de FONTE LIMPIDO – Sherburn
- de FONTIBUS – Wells
- de FORDA – Ford
- FORESTARIUS – Forester; Foster
- de FORGIA – de la Forge
- FORMANNUS – Formes
- de FORNELLIS – de Furnell
- de FORTI SCUTO – Fortescue
- de FORTIBUS – de Fort; de Forz; Force
- de FOSSA NOUA – Newdike
- de FRAISNETO; FRAXINETO – de Fraine; du Fresne
- de FRANCHEUILLA – de Freville
- FRANCUS – Franks
- de FRAXINO – del Freine; Frean; Ashe
- FRESCOBURNUS – Freshburne
- de FREUILLA – Fretchville; Freville
- de FRIGIDO MANTELLO – Freemantle
- de FRIGIDO Monte – de Fremond; Fremont
- de FRISCA VILLA – *Fretchville; Freville; Freshfield
- de FRISCO MARISCO – Freshmarsh
- FULCHERII – Fulcher
- de FULGERIIS – de Fougeres; de Filgeriis; Fulcher
- de FURNELLIS – Furneaux; Furness
- de GAIO – Gai; Gay; Jay
- de GANDANO; GANDAUENSIS – Gaunt
- GANTERIUS – Glover
- de GARDAROBA – Wardroper
- de GARDINIS – Garden
- GARNERUS – Guarnier; Warner
- de GASCONIA – Gascoyne
- de GAWEIA – Gower
- de GEINUILA – de Geynville
- de GENEUA – de Geneville
- de GENISTETO – Bromfield
- de GERARDI – Greville; Graville
- GERVASIUS – Gerveis; Jarvis; Jervis
- GIOUANUS – Young
- de GIRBIRTI VILLA – de Gerberville
- de GISNETO – de Gisney; Gynney
- de GISORTIO – de Gisors
- de GLANUILLA – Glanvil
- GOBIO – Gudgeon
- de GORNIACO – Gorney; Gurney
- GOSSELINUS – Gosling
- de GOUHERIA – Gower
- GRAMMATICUS – Grammer
- de GRANA – Graine; Grain
- de GRANAVILLA; GREENVILLA – Greenvil or Grenville
- de GRANDAVILLA – Granvile
- de GRANDISONO – de Graunson; Grandison
- GRANDIS or MAGNUS VENATOR – Grosvenor
- GRANDUS – Le Grand; Graunt; Grant
- GRANETARIUS – Grenet
- de GRANGIA – Grainge
- GRANGIARIUS – Grainger
- de GRANO ORDEI; GRANUM ORDEI – Greindorge
- GRASSUS – Le Gras; Grace; Le Gros
- de GRAVA – de la Grave; Graves
- de GRENDONA – Greendon
- de GRENTO – Grente; Grinde
- de GREYLIACO – de Greilly; Grelley
- GRIMBALDI – Grimbaud
- de GRINNOSA VILLA – de Grinville
- de GRIPERIA – Gripper
- GRISIUS – Le Grice
- de GROSSO – de Gruce; Gross
- de GROSSO MONTE – Grosmond; Grismond
- de GROSSO VENATORE – Grosvenor
- GROSSUS – Le Gros
- GROTIUS – Grose
- de GRUE – Crane
- GUARIN – Guerin
- GUIDO – Guy; Gee
- de GUIDOUILLA – Wydville; Wyville
- GULAFFRA – Golofre; Golfer; Gulfer; Golafre
- de GUNDEUILLA – Gonville
- de GUNTHERI SYLUA – Gunter
- de GUTI – del Got
- de HAIA – de la Haye; Hay
- de HAMBEIA – Hamby; Hanby
- de HANOIA – de Henau; Hanway
- de HANTONA – Hanton; Hampton
- de HARELA – Harkley
- de HARICURIA – Harcourt; Harecourt
- HARVAEUS – Harvey
- HASTIFRAGUS – Brakespere
- HAUARDUS – Howard
- de HAULA – DE LA Hale; Hall; Hawley
- de HAYA – de la Haye; Hay
- HERMITA – Armit
- HERES – Le Hare; Eyre
- HIERONYMUS – Jerome; Jerram
- de HIRUNDINE – Arundel
- HISPANIOLUS – Aspinall
- de HOGA – de la Hoge; Hogg
- de HOLMO – Holmes
- de HOSATA; de HOSA – de la Hose; de la Huse
- HOSATUS – Hose; Huese; Hussey
- HOWARDUS – Howard
- HUGO – Hook
- HUSATUS; HUSSATUS – Hoese; huese; hussey
- de ILLERIIS – de St. Hellier; Hillier
- INFANS – L'Enfant; Child
- de INGANIA – Engaine
- de INSULA – Lisle
- de INSULA BONA – Lislebone
- de INSULA FONTIS – Lilburne
- de IPRA – de Ipres
- de ISPANIA – Spain
- de JAUNA – Janeway
- JOANNIS – Johnson
- de JOANNIS VILLA – de *Jehanville; Geneville; Ganville
- JOANNUS – Jones
- JODOCUS – Joice
- JUUENIS – Lejeune; Young
- de KAHAGNIS – Keynes
- de KAINETO; de KAISNETO; de KEYNETO – *Chesney; Cheney; Keynes
- KENTESIUS – Le Kenties; Kentish
- de KIMA; KYMA – de Kyme; Keymer
- de LACELLA – Lascales; Lacelles
- de LACU – de Lake; Lake
- de LADA – de la Lade
- de LÆTO LOCO – Lettley
- de La MARA – de la Mare; Delamare, Delamere, Lamarre
- de Laga – Lee; Lea; Leigh
- LAMBARDUS – Lambard or Lambert
- de LANDAS – de la Lande; Land, De la Launde
- de LANDALIS – Landal; Landels
- de LANGDONA; LANDONA – Langdon
- LARDERARIUS – Lardenier; Lardner
- de LARGO – Large
- LATIMARIUS; Latinarius – Latimer; Latomer
- de LATO CAMPO – Bradfield
- de LATO VADO – Bradford
- de LATO PEDE – Braidfoot
- LAUREMARIUS – Lorimer
- de LECHA – Leke
- de LEGA – Leigh; Lee
- LEGATUS – Leggatt
- de LEICA – Leke
- de LEICESTRIA – Lester
- LESLÆUS – Leslie
- LEUCHENORIUS – Lewkin; Lewknor
- de LEXINTUNA – Lexington
- de LEZINIACO – de Lezinan
- de LIBERATIONE – Liverance
- de LIENTICURIA – de Liancourt
- de LIMESIA – Limsie
- de Linna – Linne
- de LISORIIS; LISORIS – Lizurs; Lisors
- de LOCO FRUMENTI – Whethamstede
- de LOGIIS – Lodge
- de LONGA SPATHA – Longespee
- de LONGA VILLA – *Longueville; Longville; Longfellow
- de LONGO CAMPO – Longchamp; Longshanks
- de LONGO PRATO – Longmede
- LOTHARINGIUS – Le Loreyne; Lorraine; Lorriner
- LOTHARIUS – Lowther
- de LUCCEIO – Lucy; Lewsey
- LUDOUICUS – de Lues; Lewis
- de LUERA – Lower
- de LUNDA – Lund
- de LUPELLIS; LUPELLUS – Lovel
- LUPUS – Le Loup; Love; Loo; Woolf
- de LUSORIIS – Lusher
- de LUXA – De Los
- MACER – Le Meyre
- MACNISIUS – Mackness
- de MADERIACO – de Mezieres; Measures
- de MAGNA PENA – de Magne Peoine; Moneypenny; Mappin
- de MAGNA VILLA – Mandeville; Mannwille
- de MAGNO MONTE – Grosmount or Groumount
- MAGNUS VENATOR – Grosvenor
- MAINFELINUS – Meinfeuin
- de MAINO – Maine; Maoun
- de MALA BISSA – de Malebisse; de Malebiche
- de MALA FIDE – Maufe
- de MALA HERBA – Malherbe
- de MALA OPERA – Mallop
- de MALA PLATEA – Malpas
- de MALA TERRA – Mauland; Eveland
- de MALA VILLA – Melville
- de MALCHENCEIO – Munchensy
- MALCONDUCTUS – Malduit; Mauduit
- MALEDOCTUS – Maudoit
- MALEDUETUS – Malduit; Mauduit
- MALISIUS – Malis
- de MALIS MANIBUS – Malmains
- de MALIS OPERIBUS – Maloor
- de MALO LEONE – Mauleon
- de MALO CONDUCTU – Malduit
- de MALA DOMO – de Maubusson
- de MALO LACU – Mauley
- de MALO VICINO; MALUS VACINUS – *Malveisin; Malvoisin; Mavesyn; Mason
- de MALO VISU – Malveya
- de MALPASSU – Malpas
- MALUS CATALUS – Malcael; Malchael; Malchein; Machel
- MALUS LEPORARIUS – Maleverer; Mallieure; Mallyvery
- MALUS LUPELLUS – Maulovel; Mallovel
- de MONDAVILLA – Mandeville; Manneville
- de MANERIIS – de Menguse; Menzies; Manners
- de MANIBUS – de Mans
- de MANNAVILLA – Mandeville; Manhill; Manwell
- de MARA – de la Mare; Mare; Marre
- de MARCHIA – de La Marche; March
- de MARCI VALLIBUS – Martival
- de MARCO – Mark
- MARESCALLUS – Marshal or Le Marshal; Merrishaw
- de MARINIS – Maryon; Marwin
- de MARISCO – del Mareis; Marsh
- MARRUGLARIUS – Le Marler
- de MARTIUALLIS – *Martivaux; Martival; Martivast; Martwas
- de MASURA – Le Massor; Measor
- MAUCLERUS – Lacklatin
- MAURENCIACUS – de Montmorency
- de MAURITANIA – de Morteine
- de MADIA VILLA – Middleton
- MEDICUS – Leech
- de MEDUANA – Maine; Mayenne
- de MELSA – de Meaulx; Meux; Mews
- MENTULAMANUS – "Toulmaine alias Hancocke"
- de MERCATO – de Marche; March
- MERCATOR – Mercer
- de MESLERIIS; de MEULERIIS – Mellers
- de MICENIS – Meschines
- MILESIUS; MILETUS – Miles
- de MINERIIS – Miners
- de MINORIIS – Minours
- de MOELIS – de Moelles or Moels; Mills
- MOLENDINARIUS – Miller; Milner
- de MOLENDINIS – Molines
- de MOLIS – de Moelles or Loels; Mills
- MONACHUS – Le Moigne; Monk
- de MONASTERIIS – Musters; Masters
- de MONCELLIS – Monceaux; Monson; Monser
- de MONEMUTHA – Monmouth
- de MONTANA – de Montaignes; de Montaigne; Mountain
- de MONTE – Mount; Mont
- de MONTE ACUTO – Montacute; Montague
- de MONTE ALTO – Montalt; Montealto; Munhaut; Mohaut; Moald; Mold; Maulde; Maude
- de MONTE AQUILÆ – Mounteagle
- de MONTE BEGONIS – Mountbegon
- de MONTE BRITONUM – de Montbreton
- de MONTE CANASIO; CANESIO; CANISIO – Montchesney; Munchensi
- de MONTE DEI – Mundy
- de MONTE DUBLELLI – de Mont Dubleaux
- de MONTE FIXO – Montfitchet; Munfitchet
- de MONTE FLORUM – de Monteflour
- de MONTE FORTI – Montfort
- de MONTE GAII; de MONTE GAUDII – Montjoy; Mungy
- de MONTE GOMERICO – Montgomery
- de MONTE HERMERII – Monthermer
- de MONTE JOUIS – Montjoy
- de MONTE KANESIO – Montchensey; Munchensi
- de MONTE MARISCO – Montmorency
- de MONTE MARTINI – de Montmartre
- de MONTE MORACI; MORENTIO – Montmorency
- de MONTE PESSONO; de MONTE PESGULANO – Montpinzon; Mompesson
- de MONTE PISSONIS; de MONTE PISSORIS – Montpinzon; Mompesson
- de MONTE REUELLI – Monterville
- de MORAUIA – Moray; Murray
- de MORISCO – Moore
- de MORTIUALLIS – de Martivaux
- de MORTUO MARI – Mortimer
- de MOTA – de La Motte
- de MOUBRAIA – Mowbray
- de MUCHELEGATA – Micklegate
- de MUMBRAIO – Mowbray
- MURDACUS – Murdoch
- AD MURUM – Walton
- de MUSEA – Mus; Mosse
- de MUSCO CAMPO – Musechamp
- MUSTELA – Musteile
- NAPPATOR – Le Naper; Napier
- de NASO – de Nes; Ness
- NEPOS – Le Neve
- NEQUAM – Neckham
- de NEVILLA – Nevil
- NIGELLUS – Niele; Neal
- NIGEROCULUS – Blackey
- de NODARIIS; NODORIIS – Nowres
- NORENSIS – Noreis; Nordman; Norman
- NORMANDUS – Norman
- NORRISCUS – Norris; Nurse
- de NORUICO – Norwich
- de NOVA TERRA – Newland
- de NOVA VILLA – Neufville; Neville; Newell
- de NOVIOMO – Noon
- de NOVO BURGO – Newburgh; Newborough
- de NOVO CASTELLOM – Newcastle
- de NOVO FORE – de Neumarche; Newmarch
- de NOVO LOCO – Newark
- de NOVO MERCATO – de Neumarche; Newmarch
- de NOVO OPPIDO – Newton
- NOUUS – Newman
- NOUUS HOMO – Newman
- NUTRICIUS – Nurse
- de OBURUILLA – de Abbeville; Appeville
- de OILEIO; OILI; OILIUS – D'Oylu; Olley
- de OMNIBUS SANCTIS – Toussaint
- de ORTIACO – del Ortyay; Lorty;
- OSTIARIUS – Le Huissier; Usher; Durward (Scotch)
- de OUGHTIA – Doughty
- de PACCEIO – de Pasci; Pacy
- PACCEUS – Pace
- PAGANELLUS – Pagnell; Painel; Paynell
- PAGANUS – Payne
- PALMARIUS – Le Paumier; Palmer
- PALMIGER – Palmer
- de PALO – del Pau
- de Palude – Puddle; Marsh
- de PAREO – Park; Perck
- PARMENTARIUS – Parmenter; Taylor
- de PARUA TARRI – Torel; Tyrrel
- de PARUA VILLE – Littleton
- PARUUS – Le Petit; Petty
- de PASCUO LAPIDOSO – Stanley
- de PAUILLIACO; de PAULIACO – Pavley
- PECCATUM; de PECCATO; PECCATUS – *Peche; Pecche; Pecke
- de PEDE PLANCO – Pauncefoot
- PEITONUS – Peyton
- PELLIPARIUS – Skinner
- PENTECOSTES – Wytesoneday
- PERFECTUS – Parfey; Parfitt
- de PERIIS – Piers
- de PERONA – Perowne
- de PERRARIIS – Perrers
- de PETRA – Petre
- de PETRAPONTE; PETROPONTO – Peirrepont; Perpoint
- PEVERELLUS – Peverell
- PHISCERUS – Fisher
- de PICTAIIA; PICTAUIENNSIS – Peytevin; Peyto; Peto
- PINCERNA – Butler
- de PINIBUS – Dupin
- de PINU – Pine; Pyne
- PIPERELLUS – Pepperell; Peverell
- PISCATOR – Fisher
- de PISCE; de PISCIBUS – Fish
- de PISSIACO – Poysey
- PLACIDUS – Placett
- de PLANCA – De la Planche
- de PLANTAGENTISTA – Plantagenent
- de PLESSETIS; PLESSEIZ – de *Pleseys; Plesseiz; Plessez; Plaiz; Place
- de PODIO – des Pus
- POHERIUS – Puherius
- de POLA – de la Pole
- de POLEIO – Poley
- POLUS – Pole; Poole
- de POMARIO – Appleyard
- PONDERATOR – Le Balauncer
- de PONTE – Bridge
- de PONTE FRACTO – Pomfrey
- AD PONTEM – Atte Brigge; Brigge; Paunton
- de PONTIBUS – Bridgeman; Bridges
- de PONTISSARA; PONTISSERA -Sawbridge; pontoise; Pontys
- PONTIUS – Pons; Pounce
- PORCARIUS – Le Porcher
- de PORCELLIS – Purcell
- AD PORTAM – Porter
- POTTARIUS – Potter
- le POURE – Power
- POUTENEIUS – Poultney
- de PRAELLIS – See also "de PRAERIIS"
- PRÆPOSITUS – Prevot
- de PRAERIIS – Praeres; Prahors
- de PRATELLIS – des *Pres; Despreaux; Diprose; Meadows
- de PRATIS – Praty; Prettie
- de PRATO – Dupre; Mead; Pratt
- de PRECARIIS – See also "de PRAERIIS"
- PRECO – Price
- PUHERIUS; PUHERUS – Le Poher; Poer
- de PUILLETA – Paulet
- de PULCHRO CAPELLITIO – Fairfax
- PULETARIUS – Le Poleter; Poulter
- PUNTIS – Pons; Pounce
- de PURCELLIS – Purcell
- de PUTEACO – de Pusat; Pudsey; Pusev
- de PUTEIS – Pittes
- de PUTEO – Pitt
- de PYSANIS – de Pessaigne
- QUASPATRICIUS – Gospatric
- RAALEGA – Ralegh
- de RADENEIO – de Reyney; Rodney
- de RADEONA – Rodney
- de RADIO – Raye
- RAGOTUS – Le Raggide; Raggett
- de RAIMIS – de Reimes
- de RALEGA – Ralegh
- de REA – de Ree; Ray
- de REDUERIIS – Rivers
- REGINALDI – Renaud; Reynolds
- REGINALDUS – Reynold
- REGIOSYLUANUS – Kingswood
- REINARDUS – Rayner; Reyner
- RENOLDUS – Reynold
- REX – King; Reeks
- RHESEUS – Ap Rhys; Ap Rice; Price
- de RIA – de Rie; Rye
- de RICO MONTE – Richmond
- RIGIDIUS – Rivers
- de RIPERIA; RIPARIIS; RIVERIA; RIVERIIS – de *Ripers; Rivers; Driver
- ROBERTIADES – Roberts
- de ROCA – Rock
- de RODENEIA – Rodney
- RODERICUS – Rothery
- de RODOLIO – de Roel; Rolle
- de ROILLIO – de Roilli; Reuilly; Rowley
- de ROKA – Rock
- de ROKELA – Rockley
- de ROMELIOLO – de Romilli; Romilly; Rumley
- ROTARIUS – Wheeler; Rutter
- de ROTIS – Rote; Roots
- de ROTUNDO; ROTUNDUS – Ronde; Round; Rounce
- de RUA – Rue
- de RUBEO MONTE – Rougemont
- de RUBRA MANU – Redmayne
- de RUBRA SPATHA – Rospear; Rooper; Roper
- de RUBRO CLIUO – Radcliffe
- de RUDA – Routh
- de RUELLA – Ruel; Rule
- RUFFUS; RUFUS – Le Roux; Le Rus; Rous; Ruff
- de RUGEHALA – Rugeley; Ruggles
- de RUPE – de la Roche; Roche; Droope; Drope; Roek
- de RUPE CAUARDI – de Rochechouard
- de RUPE FORTI – Rochfort
- de RUPE SCISSA – Cutcliffe
- de Rupella – de la Rochelle; Rokell; Roupell
- de RUPERIA – {See also RUPETRA}
- de RUPETRA – de Rupierre; Rooper; Roper
- de RUPIBUS; RUPINUS – Roche; Rock
- de SABAUDIA – Savoy
- de SACCA VILLA – Sackville
- de SACEIO – de Sace; de Sauce
- de SACHEVILLA – de Sacquenville; Soucheville; Sackville
- de SACRA FAGO – Hollebech; Holbeach
- de SACRA QUERCU – Holyoak
- de SACRO BOSCO – Holywood
- de SACRO FONTE – Holybrook; Holbrook
- SAGITTARIUS – Archer
- de SAIO – Say
- de SAKENVILLA – Sackville
- de SALCETO – Saucey
- de SALCHAVILLA – Salkeld
- de SALICOSA MARA – Wilmore
- de SALICOSA VENA – Salvein
- de SALSO MARISCO – Saumarez; Saltmarsh
- de SALTU CAPELLÆ – Sacheverel
- de SALTU LACTEO – Melkeley
- SALVAGIUS – Savage
- SANCHO – Sankey
- de SANETA BARBA or BARBARA – Senbarb; Simberb
- de SANCTA CLARA – St. Clare; Sinclair
- de SANCTA CRUCE – St. Croix; Cross
- de SANCTA ERMINA – Armine
- de SANCTA FIDE – St. Faith; Faith; Fiddes
- de SANCTA GENEVEFA – Jeneway
- de SANTA MARIA – St. Mary (found in numerous 11th century charters, mainly as witnesses or grants, as opposed to fee records)
- de SANCTA TERRA – Holyland
- de SANCTA VILLA – Sent Vile; Sainneville
- de SANCTO ALBANO – St. Alban
- de SANCTO ALBINO – Seyntabyn; St. Aubyn
- de SANCTO ALEMONDO – Salmon
- de SANCTO AMANDO – St. Amand; Samand
- de SANCTO AUDEMARO – St. Omer
- de SANCTO AUDOENO – St. Owen
- de SANCTO BRICIO – Brice
- de SANCTO CINERINO – Chinnery
- de SANCTO CLARO – Senclere; Sinclair
- de SANCTO CLAUDO – Clodd; Clode
- de SANCTO CRISPINO – Crispin; Crisp
- de SANCTO DIONYSIO – Dennis
- de SANCTO EDMUNDO – Edmunds
- de SANCTO EDOLPHO – Stydolph
- de SANCTO EDUARDO – Edwards
- de SANCTO EUSTACIO – Stacey
- de SANCTO GELASIO – Singlis
- de SANCTO GERMANO – Germain
- de SANCTO HILARIO – Hillary
- de SANCTO JOHANNE – St. John; Singen
- de SANCTO JUDOCO – de Joyeuse; Jorz; Joyce
- de SANCTO LAUDO; de SANCTO LODO – St. Laud; Sentlo; Senlo
- de SANCTO LEODEGARIO – St. Ledger; Sallenger; Ledger
- de SANCTO LEONARDO – Lennard
- de SANCTO LIZIO – St. Lys; Senliz
- de SANCTO LUPO – Sentlow
- de SANCTO LUZO – Sentluke
- de SANCTO MARTINO – de Danmartin; Semarton; Martin
- de SANCTO MAURISIO – St. Morris
- de SANCTO MAURO – St. Maur
- de SANCTO MEDARDO – Semark
- de SANCTO NEOTO – Sennett
- de SANCTO OLAUO – Toly
- de SANCTO PAULO – Sampol; Semple
- de SANCTO PETRO – Sampier; Semper; Symper
- de SANCTO PHILEBERTO – Filbert
- de SANCTO QUINTINO – St. Quintin
- de SANCTO REMIGIO – de St. Remy; Remy
- de SANCTO SERENNIO – Chinnery
- de SANCTO VEDASTO – Foster
- de SANCTO VIGORE – Vygour
- de SANCTO WALLERICO – St. Wallere; Waller
- de SANDUICO – Sandwich
- SAPIENS – Le Sage
- SARACENUS – Sarazin; Sarson
- SARTORIUS – Sartoris; Sartres
- SAVAGIUS – Savage
- SAVARICUS – Savory
- de SAVINIACO – de Savigny; Saveney
- de SAXO FERRATO – Ironston; Ironzon
- de SCALARIIS – de Scaliers; Scales
- de SCOLEIO – Scully
- de SCURIS – LESCURES
- de SEINLICIO; SENLYCIO – de Seinliz
- de SELLA – de Salle; Sale
- SENESCALLUS – Stewart; Stuart
- de SEPTEM HIDIS – de Sethides
- de SEPTEM VALLIBUS – de Setvaux
- de SEPTEM VANNIS – Setvans
- SERLO – Searle
- de SEUECURDA – Seacourt
- SEVALLUS – Sewell
- de SICCA VILLA – de Secheville; de *Sacheville; Satchwell; Sackville
- de SIDEVILLA – Sidwell
- SILVANUS – Silvain; Salvin
- SINE AVERIO – Sanzaver
- SIVARDUS – Seward
- de SMALAUILLA – {See MALAUILLA}
- de SOLA – Sole
- de SOLARIIS – Solers
- SOPHOCARDIUS – Wiseheart
- de SPADA – Speed; Speedy
- de SPINETO – Spine; Spinney
- de STAGNO – Stanhow; Poole; Pond
- de STAMPIS – d'Estampes; Stamp
- de STELLA – Stel; Steele
- STEPHANIDES – Fitz Stephen
- STIGANAUS – Stiggins
- de STIPITE SICCO – de la Zouche
- de STOTEVILLA – d'Estoteville; Stutfield
- STRABO – Louch
- de STRATAVILLA – d'Estréeville; Streatfield
- de STRATONA – Stretton
- SUB NEMORE – Underwood
- de SUDBURIA – Sudbury
- de SUILLEIO – de Suilli; Sully
- SUPER TYSAM – Surteys; Surtees
- de SUREVILLA – Surville; Sherville
- de SUTHLEIA; SUTLEIA – Suthley; Sudley
- de SYLUA – Weld
- SYLUANECTENSIS – Seyton
- de TABERNA – Taverner
- TALLIATOR – Taylor
- de TANAIA – Taney
- de TANCO – de Tani; Tawney
- de TANKARDI VILLA – Tankerville
- TANNATOR – Le Tanur; Tanner
- TAXO – Tesson; Tyson
- TELARIUS – Taylor; Tylor
- de TERTIA MANU – Tremayne
- TEUTONICUS – Tyes; Teys
- THAMARIUS – Thame; Tame
- de THANETO – Thanet; Tanet; Tent
- THEOBALDUS – Tipple
- THEODORICUS – Terry; Derrick
- de THORNAMUSA – Torneumue
- de TIRNISCO – de Terouisch
- de TOLETA – Tollitt; Tullet
- de TONA – Tonny; Tony
- de TORTO – Turt
- de TOSCA – Tosh
- de TRIBUS MINETIS – Treminet
- de TRUBLEUILLA – Troubleville; Turberville
- de TULKA – Tuke; Toke
- de TURBIDA VILLA – Turberville
- TURCHETILLUS – Turchill
- de TURPI VADO – Fulford
- de TURRI – Towers; Torry
- de TURRIBUS – de Turs; de Tours
- de TYLIA – Tille; Tyley
- de UFFINTONA – Ufton
- de UMBROSA QUERCU – Dimoak; Dimock
- de URTIACO – de Lorty; Lort; Hort
- de USSEIO – Ducie
- USUSMARE – Hussey
- de VAACEIO – de Vaacey; Vaizey
- VACA – de la Wae; Wake
- VACARIUS – Vacher; Levaque; Livock
- de VACCARIA – Vicary; Vickery
- de VADA – Wade
- de VADO BOUM – Oxford
- de VADO SAXI – Stanford
- VALCHELINUS – Wakelin
- de VALEIO – de Valle; Wall
- de VALENCIA – Valence
- VALESIUS – Walsh
- de VALLE – Wale; Wall
- de VALLE TORTA – Valetor; Vautort
- de VALLIBUS – de Vals; Vaux
- de VALLO – Wall
- de VALONIIS – de Valognes; Valoines
- de VALUINIS – Wauwain; Walwyn
- de VANNARIO – Le Vanner
- de VARAVILLA – Varvill; Warwell
- VARDÆUS – Ward
- VELOX – Swift; Fogarty
- VENATOR – Vendore; Venour
- de VENETIA – Venesse
- de VERINEIO – de Verigny; Verney
- de VERNACO – de Vernai; Ferney
- de VESCI – Vessey
- de VETERE AULA – Oldhall; Oldham
- de VETERE PONTE – Vieuxpont; Vipont; Veepount
- de VETULA – Vale; Viel; Vyel
- de VETULIS – de Vielles
- VETULUS – Viel
- de VICARIIS – Viccars
- VICINUS – Le Veysin
- de VICO – de Vicques; Vick
- VIDULATOR – Le Vielur
- de Vigneio – da Vigny; de Wignai
- de VILLA – Veal
- de VILLA MAGNA – Mandeville
- de VILLA MOTA; MOUTA – Wilmot
- de VILLA TORTA – Croketon
- de VILLARIIS – Villiers
- de VINDINO – de Vendome; Phantam
- de VINO SALUO – Vinsauf
- de VIRIDI CAMPO – Greenfield
- de VIRIDI VILLA – Greenville
- VITULUS – See also "VETULUS"
- VULPIS – Renard; Rainer
- VULSÆUS – Wolsey
- de WACELLIS – Wasel; Vassall
- WALCHELINUS – Wakelin
- WALLENSIS – Le Walleis; Wallace
- de WANCEIO – Wansey
- de WARENNA – Warren
- WARENNARIUS – Warrender
- de WARNEUILLA – Warneville
- de WARTEUILLA – See also "de WATEUILLA"
- de WASA – Wace
- de WASPRIA – de Guaspre; de Waspre; Vosper
- de WATELEGA – Wateley; Wheatley
- de WATEUILLA – Waleville; Waterfield
- de WELLEBO – de Wellebof; Welbore
- WISCARDUS – Wishart
- WOLLÆUS – Wolley
- WOLSÆUS – Wolsey
- WOLUESÆUS – Wolsey
- de WYUILLA – Wyville; Weevil; Whewell

== Biological taxonomy ==
One of the most abundant sources of Latinized names is in biological taxonomic nomenclature, particularly binomial nomenclature. Many thousands of species are named after individuals, chiefly but not exclusively scientists. This most often involves, in principle, creating a Latinized equivalent of the name in question. In some cases this will involve a traditional latinization; for example, the grey penduline tit, Anthoscopus caroli, derives its specific name from the genitive of the traditional Latin form Carolus for the first name of the Swedish explorer Karl Johan Andersson. In most cases, the names are "one-off" Latinized forms produced by adding the genitive endings -ii or -i for a man, -ae for a woman, or -orum in plural, to a family name, thereby creating a Latinized form. For example, a name such as Macrochelys temminckii notionally represents a latinization of the family name of Coenraad Jacob Temminck to "Temminckius." Another example, Acisoma attenboroughi, Latinizes the name of Sir David Attenborough as if "Attenboroughus."

== See also ==
- List of Latin nicknames of the Middle Ages
- Onomastics – Study of proper names
  - Anthroponymy – Study of the names of human beings
  - Socio-onomastics – Study of names in a social and cultural context
