= Jan Recker =

German business informatics researcher

Jan Recker (born 8 September 1979 in Essen) is a German researcher in the field of business informatics. Since 2021, he has been Nucleus Professor (W3) for Information Systems and Digital Innovation at the University of Hamburg, funded by the Excellence Strategy of the German Federal Government and the States. He ranks among the most successful information systems researchers globally.

== Education and career ==
Jan Recker earned a bachelor's and master's degree in business informatics from the University of Münster (both in 2004) and a doctorate (PhD) in business informatics (information systems) from Queensland University of Technology in 2008. He won several awards for his degrees, including the Mercer AlumniUM Master's Award for his master's degree, the BearingPoint Award for his master's thesis, and the ACPHIS Information Systems Doctoral Thesis Award for his doctoral thesis. After completing his doctorate, he worked as a senior lecturer (2008–2010), associate professor (2010–2012), and full professor (2012–2017) at Queensland University of Technology. Between 2012 and 2016, his research was funded by Woolworths Ltd. through the Woolworths Chair of Retail Innovation. From 2018 to 2021, Jan Recker taught as Chaired Professor of Information Systems and Systems Development at the University of Cologne.

== Main scientific contributions ==
Jan Recker's research focuses on the opportunities and risks of digitalization and artificial intelligence for companies. His research interests include digital entrepreneurship and the creation of new digital companies, the invention and use of digital innovations by firms, the digital transformation of existing organizations, the digitalization of products, services, and processes, the management of artificial intelligence, and the provision of digital solutions for sustainable development goals.

Between 2005 and 2010, Jan Recker focused primarily on the adoption of the new process modeling standard BPMN. He published the first studies of the usage of the BPMN standard by business and process analysts. The results subsequently contributed to the further development of the standard. From 2010 onwards, he increasingly focused on the question of how companies develop and use digital solutions to successfully implement sustainability strategies. Together with Stefan Seidel and Jan vom Brocke, he published one of the first field studies on the topic. Since 2012, Jan Recker has been addressing issues related to digitalization, innovation, and entrepreneurship. He developed new theories about how technological developments influence entrepreneurship and how companies can manage artificial intelligence.

His textbook Scientific for Research in Information Systems: A Beginner's Guide has been popular for training research students and emerging scientists in business informatics.
