= Dirk Zupancic =

German academic (born 1969)

- Born: 1969
- Education: Philipps-University of Marburg; University of St. Gallen (Ph.D.)
- Occupation(s): Former President and professor at the private German Graduate School of Management and Law, Professor at the University of St. Gallen

Dirk Zupancic (* 1969) is a German academic. He was president and professor for management and management education at the private German Graduate School of Management and Law as well as professor and leader of the Competence Center for Business-to-Business Marketing at the University of St. Gallen.

== Life ==
Dirk Zupancic served as commissioned officer at the German Luftwaffe (air force) and qualified as banker. He then worked in finance in the field of consulting, marketing and sales. He studied business and economy with emphasis on marketing, banking and business informatics at the Philipps-University of Marburg. He then earned his Ph.D. from the University of St. Gallen where he led science projects. In addition to that he led the university’s post-graduate studies for systematized marketing for several years. After completing his Ph.D. he took over the leadership of the Competence Center for Business-to-Business Marketing at the Institute for Marketing and Trade (IMH-HSG) and later he also led the Management and Education division for many years. Since completing his studies he also works as consultant and coach. Until 2005 he was partner at a private equity consulting firm in Zürich for four years. In 2005 he founded his own consulting network "DZP Dirk Zupancic & Partner" in St. Gallen.

Between 2008 and 2016 Dirk Zupancic served as professor for industrial-goods-marketing and sales at the German Graduate School of Management and Law (GGS). In 2009 he became CEO of the school and became its president in 2011. Zupancic left the GGS in 2016.

He is author of eight books, 60 specialist articles and multiple science reports. He serves as speaker in management programs of universities and firms.

== Publications (selection) ==
- Dirk Zupancic, Christian Belz and Wolfgang Bussmann: Best Practice in Key Account Management. Mi Wirtschaftsbuch 2005, ISBN 3-636-03013-2.
- Axel Elfroth and Sonja Neckermann and Dirk Zupancic: Kundenzufriedenheit in B2B-Geschäftsbeziehungen. Symposion, Düsseldorf 2005.
- Holger Dannenberg and Dirk Zupancic: Excellence in Sales: Empirische Ergebnisse einer länderübergreifenden Erfolgsfaktorenstudie im Vertrieb. Fachbericht 01/2007. Thexis, St. Gallen 2007.
- Wolfgang Bussmann and Dirk Zupancic: Verkäufer im Spiegel des Einkaufs. Kommentierte Ergebnisse einer Einkäuferbefragung. Fachbericht 2007. Thexis, St. Gallen 2007.
- Holger Dannenberg and Dirk Zupancic: Spitzenleistungen in Vertrieb und Kundenmanagement. Wiesbaden, Gabler 2008.
- Dirk Zupancic and Wolfgang Bussmann: Verkaufen von Profi zu Profi. Den Einkauf überzeugen - Mehr Umsatz mit Geschäftskunden. mi-Fachverlag, Landsberg 2008.
- Christian Belz, Markus Müllner and Dirk Zupancic: Spitzenleistungen im Key Account Management. Das St. Galler KAM-Konzept. 2. Auflage, Redline, Frankfurt am Main 2008.
- Holger Dannenberg und Dirk Zupancic: Excellence in Sales. Gabler. Wiesbaden 2008.
- Christian Belz, Christian Schmitz and Dirk Zupancic: Wettbewerbsvorteil Vertrieb. Marketing Review St. Gallen, 3-2008.
- Christian Belz, Dirk Zupancic: Sales Driven Company. Themenheft, Marketing Review St.Gallen 1–2010.
- Holger Dannenberg, Dirk Zupancic: Excellence in Sales. Wiesbaden: Gabler 2009.
