= Studentes =

Theatrical comic interlude

Studentes, comœdia de vita studiosorum
- Original language: Neo-Latin
- Written by: Christoph Stummel
- Genre: Student comedy

Premiere
- Date: c.1545

Studentes is a theatrical comic interlude in five acts, written 1545 by Christoph Stummel (1525-1588), a 19-year-old student at Alma Mater Viadrina. The full title of the comedy was Studentes, comœdia de vita studiosorum (The Students, a comedy about student life). The play was printed in 1549 by Johann Eichorn, a printer and publisher in Frankfurt (Oder). With his humanistic comedy, Christoph Stummel created the first student comedy and, along the way, founded a genre that today is mainly served in cinemas.

== Morality play ==
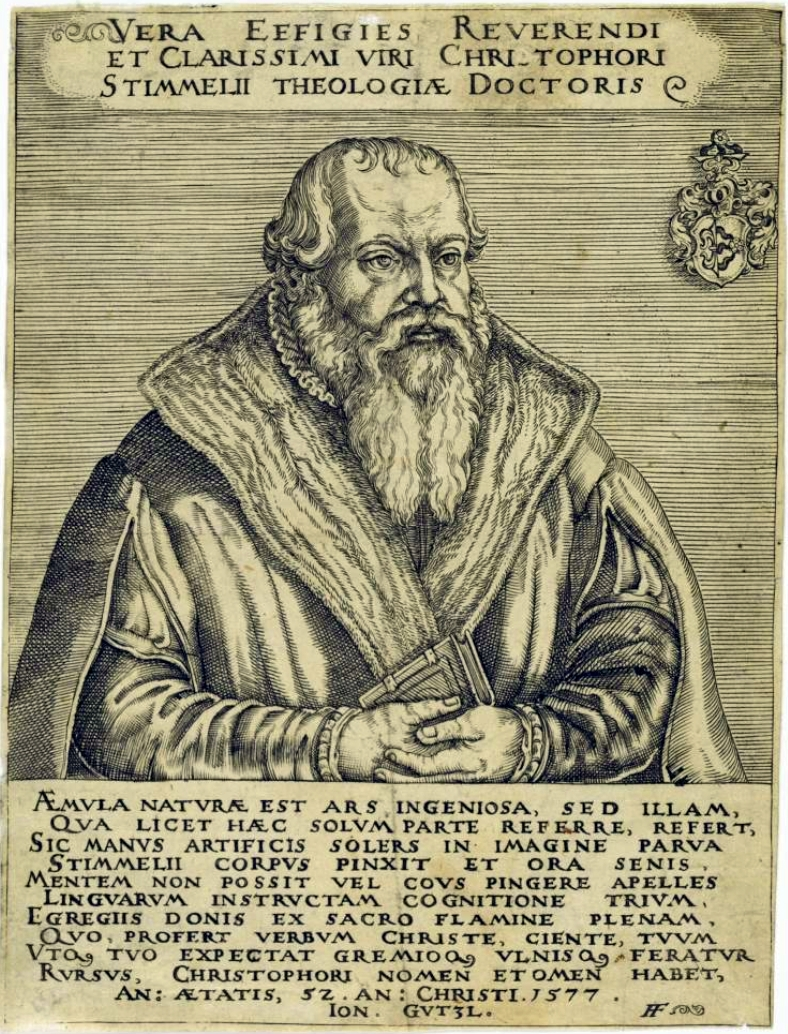
The author Christoph Stymmelius by Frantz Friderich (1577/1584)

The play is about the temptations of student life. Three fathers send their sons to the nearby university. While Philomates eagerly attends lectures and learns, the two others go to the pub and gamble away their money. Then Acrates is injured in a brawl, while Acolastus impregnates the innkeeper's daughter and has to marry her.

== Dramatis personae ==
All names originate from Ancient Greek and indicate the character of the person.

- Philargyrus (the moneylover), father.
- Eubulus (the good adviser), father.
- Philostorgus (the fond-of-children), father.
- Philomathes (the nerd), son of Philargyrus.
- Acolastus (the dissolute), son of Eubulus.
- Acrates (the excessive), son of Philostorgus.
- Colax (the flatterer), student.
- Myspolus (Walks-like-a-mouse), student.
- Philostasius (the quarrelsome), student.
- Musopolus (the servant of the mus), student.
- Euprositus (the accessible), father.
- Eleutheria (the unprejudiced), mother.
- Deleastisa (the alluring), both daughter.
- Paedeutes (the teacher), university professor.
- Phrontistes (the attendant), his servant.
- Danista (the moneylender), innkeeper.
- nameless journeymen craftsmen.

== Editions ==
- STVDENTES, COMOEDIA DE VITA STVDIOSORVM, nunc primum in lucem edita autore M. Christophoro Stummelio, F. Eiusdem carmen de iudicio Paridis. Addita est Praefatio Jodoci Willichii et Epilogus a M. Christophoro Cornero. Francoforti ad Viadrum in officina Joannis Eichorn anno MDXLIX. (First edition 1549: Digitalisat and Google Books.)
- STVDENTES, COMOEDIA DE VITA STVDIOSORVM. Excvdebat Iohannes Eichorn Francofordii ad Viadrum, Anno MDL. (1550.) (Digitalisat 1) (Digitalisat 2)
- STVDENTES, COMOEDIA DE VITA STVDIOSORVM. Excudebat Ioannes Verwithaghen, Antwerpen 1551. (Google Books)
- STVDENTES, COMOEDIA DE VITA STVDIOSORVM. Coloniæ. In ædibus Petri Horst. Anno 1552. (Google Books)
- STVDENTES, comoedia de vita studiosorum, excudebat Io. Eichorn, Frankfurt/Oder 1554.
- STVDENTES, COMOEDIA DE VITA STVDIOSORVM. Excudebat Petrus Horst, Coloniae 1561. (Google Books)
- STVDENTES. Comoedia de vita studiosorum. Nunc primum in lucem ædita, authore M. Christophoro Stummelio, F. Eiusdem carmen de iudicio Paridis. Addita est Præfatio Iodoci VVilichÿ et epilogus à M. Christophoro Cornero. Coloniae, Apud Petrum Horst, 1579. (Digitalisat)
- Comoedia duae: I. ISAAC. De immolatione Isaac. II. STVDENTES. De vita & moribus Studiosorum. Stetini in Officina Andreae Kellneri, Anno 1579. (Digitalisat)

== Reception ==
An unknown Dutch author published his own interpretation under the pseudonym "Ignoto Peerdeklontius" (Dutch Lat. Unknown horse dumpling or Anonymous horse apple). Lachmann called it a plagiarism, since it largely corresponds to the original and also bears the almost identical title: Studentes sive Comoedia de vita Studiosorum autore Ignoto Peerdeklontio. Alentopholi. (1647, 1662, 1775; probably in Amsterdam). The fictitious place of printing Alentopholis probably goes back to a printing error and would then stand for Alethopolis (truth city). Acrates is here called Isgeestus and the final scene has also been considerably changed.

- Studentes sive Comoedia de vita Studiosorum Autore Ignoto Peerdeklontio. Alentopholi. In Aedibus Iberiorici Nobilimi 1647.
- Studentes sive Comoedia de vita Studiosorum Autore Ignoto Peerdeklontio. Alentopholi. In Aedibus Iberiorici Nobilimi 1662. (Digitalisat)

== See also ==
- Alt-Heidelberg
- 13 Semester
- L'Auberge Espagnole
