= VGU =

VGU may refer to:

- Virtual Global University, a virtual university offering online distance education or virtual education.
- Vietnamese-German University, a Vietnamese public university from Ho Chi Minh City, Vietnam.
