= Virtual Global University =

The Virtual Global University (VGU) is a virtual university offering online distance education or virtual education on the Internet.

== Organization ==
The Virtual Global University (VGU) is a private organization founded in 2001 by 17 professors of Business Informatics from 14 different universities in Germany, Austria, and Switzerland. The VGU brings together the knowledge and experience of people from different universities in one virtual organization. At the same time, it is a real organization, according to German civil law under the name "VGU Private Virtual Global University GmbH."

Within the Virtual Global University, the School of Business Informatics (SBI) is the organizational unit that offers online courses and an online study program.

== Studies ==
The focus of VGU's study offerings is information technology (IT) and management—or Business Informatics as it is called in Central Europe. Students of Business Informatics (BI) are taught how to use IT effectively to develop business solutions for global challenges.

All courses offered by the VGU are based on the Internet as well as on commonly available information and communication technology and are given entirely, or are substantially supported, by means of electronic media. The MBI can be conducted either in English or in German.

=== MBI program ===
The VGU offers a master's program leading to the degree of an "International Master of Business Informatics" (MBI). The creation of the MBI was supported by the German "Bundesministerium für Bildung und Forschung" (federal ministry of education and research) within the program "New Media in Education." The program is accredited by the government as well as by ACQUIN. The master's degree is awarded by the European University Viadrina (EUV) in Frankfurt (Oder), Germany, in cooperation with the VGU. While the latter provides expertise and teaching for the program, EUV is responsible for ensuring that the academic and educational standards of the program are maintained at an appropriate level.

=== Certificate courses ===
Independent certificate courses on a number of IT and management topics are offered in addition to the master program MBI.

== Faculty and management ==
=== Head ===
The head of the Virtual Global University is Prof. Dr. Karl Kurbel. He is also CEO of the VGU GmbH and head of the Business Informatics Chair at the European University Viadrina in Frankfurt (Oder), Germany.

=== Faculty ===
The faculty of the School of Business Informatics consists of 18 professors plus external lecturers, assisted by teaching assistants. The current faculty members are:

- Prof. Dr. Freimut Bodendorf, Chair of Information Systems II, Friedrich-Alexander-University, Erlangen-Nuremberg, Germany
- Prof. Dr. Stefan Eicker, Research Group for Business Informatics and Software Engineering, University of Duisburg-Essen, Essen, Germany
- Prof. Dr. Dimitris Karagiannis, Institute of Applied Computer Science and Information Systems - Knowledge Engineering, University of Vienna, Vienna, Austria
- Prof. Dr. Gerhard Knolmayer, Institute of Information Systems - Research Group "Information Engineering," University of Berne, Berne, Switzerland
- Prof. Dr. Hermann Krallmann, Department of Computer Science - Systems Analysis, Technische Universität Berlin, Berlin, Germany
- Prof. Dr. Karl Kurbel, Chair of Business Informatics, European University Viadrina, Frankfurt (Oder), Germany
- Prof. Dr. Susanne Leist, Faculty of Business, Economics and Information Systems, University of Regensburg, Regensburg, Germany
- Prof. Dr. Peter Loos, Institute of Business Informatics, Saarland University, Saarbruecken, Germany
- Prof. Dr. Gustaf Neumann, Chair of Information Systems and New Media, Vienna University of Economics and Business Administration, Vienna, Austria
- Prof. Dr. Andreas Oberweis, Institute of Applied Informatics and Formal Description Methods, University of Karlsruhe, Karlsruhe, Germany
- Prof. Dr. Guenther Pernul, Faculty of Business, Economics and Information Systems, University of Regensburg, Regensburg, Germany
- Prof. Dr. Claus Rautenstrauch, Department of Business Information Systems, Otto-von-Guericke University, Magdeburg, Germany
- Prof. Dr. Susanne Robra-Bissantz, Department of Business Informatics, Braunschweig University of Technology, Braunschweig, Germany
- Prof. Dr.-Ing. Hans Roeck, Chair of Business Informatics, University of Rostock, Rostock, Germany
- Prof. Dr. August-Wilhelm Scheer, Institute of Business Informatics, Saarland University, Saarbruecken, Germany
- Prof. Dr. Bernd Scholz-Reiter, Bremen Institute of Industrial Technology and Applied Work Science, University of Bremen, Bremen, Germany
- Prof. Dr. Wolffried Stucky, Institute of Applied Informatics and Formal Description Methods, University of Karlsruhe, Karlsruhe, Germany
- Prof. Dr. Alfred Taudes, Department of Production Management, Vienna University of Economics and Business Administration, Vienna, Austria
- Prof. Dr. Robert Winter, Institute of Information Management, University of St. Gallen, St. Gallen, Switzerland
