= Martin Eisend =

German professor of marketing

Martin Eisend (born September 14, 1968, in Auerbach in der Oberpfalz, Bavaria, Germany) is a German marketing professor at the European University Viadrina in Frankfurt (Oder).

== Biography ==
Eisend studied communication science and business administration at the Free University of Berlin and the Fernuniversität Hagen from 1994 to 2000. After completing his master's degree, he worked as a research assistant at the Chair of Marketing, headed by Alfred Kuss, at the Free University of Berlin from 2000 to 2004. He received his doctorate in 2003. From 2004 to 2007, he was junior professor for marketing, especially market communication, at the Free University of Berlin. In 2007, he has been offered the chair for marketing at the European University Viadrina, where he has been working since then. From 2014 to 2018, he was Study Dean of the Faculty of Business and Economics and since 2019, he has been vice president for Research, Graduate Education, and Knowledge Transfer at the European University Viadrina.

He held guest professorships and research stays at Columbia University in New York City in 2006; at Antwerp University in 2011; at the Amsterdam School of Communication Research (ASCOR) at the University of Amsterdam in 2015; at Macquarie University in Sydney and at the Vienna University of Economics and Business in 2016. Since 2017, he is heading the Center for Market Communications. He has been President of the European Advertising Academy since 2018.

== Research ==
Martin Eisend's research focuses on consumer behavior and marketing communication. Other work explains the effect of specific marketing communication techniques, such as the use of humor, creativity, advertising repetitions, or negative information in advertising.

His work involves the application of meta-analyses and he has written some methodological and epistemological works on the application and development of this method as well as on the scientific methodology in marketing in general.

== Recognition ==
In the ranking of the German newspaper Wirtschaftswoche in 2020, which analyzes the research performance of more than 3000 researchers in business administration in Germany, Austria and Switzerland based on the quality of their publications, he placed 13th place for current research performance and 19th place for career performance.

== Publications (selection) ==
=== Journal publications ===
- Bergkvist, Lars; Eisend, Martin (May 2021). "The dynamic nature of marketing constructs". Journal of the Academy of Marketing Science. 49 (3): 521–541. doi:10.1007/s11747-020-00756-w. S2CID 229502012.
- Eisend, Martin; Hermann, Erik (December 2020). "Sexual orientation and consumption: Why and when do homosexuals and heterosexuals consume differently?". International Journal of Research in Marketing. 37 (4): 678–696. doi:10.1016/j.ijresmar.2020.01.005.
- Okazaki, Shintaro; Eisend, Martin; Plangger, Kirk; de Ruyter, Ko; Grewal, Dhruv (December 2020). "Understanding the Strategic Consequences of Customer Privacy Concerns: A Meta-Analytic Review" (PDF). Journal of Retailing. 96 (4): 458–473. doi:10.1016/j.jretai.2020.05.007. S2CID 225683693.
- Rosengren, Sara; Eisend, Martin; Koslow, Scott; Dahlen, Micael (November 2020). "A Meta-Analysis of When and How Advertising Creativity Works". Journal of Marketing. 84 (6): 39–56. doi:10.1177/0022242920929288. S2CID 222231693.
- Eisend, Martin (January 2019). "Gender Roles". Journal of Advertising. 48 (1): 72–80. doi:10.1080/00913367.2019.1566103. S2CID 219536064.
- Eisend, Martin; Hermann, Erik (8 August 2019). "Consumer Responses to Homosexual Imagery in Advertising: A Meta-Analysis". Journal of Advertising. 48 (4): 380–400. doi:10.1080/00913367.2019.1628676. S2CID 199164894.
- Eisend, Martin (June 2019). "Explaining Digital Piracy: A Meta-Analysis". Information Systems Research. 30 (2): 636–664. doi:10.1287/isre.2018.0821.
- Eisend, Martin (May 2015). "Have We Progressed Marketing Knowledge? A Meta-Meta-Analysis of Effect Sizes in Marketing Research". Journal of Marketing. 79 (3): 23–40. doi:10.1509/jm.14.0288. S2CID 167526635.
- Schmidt, Susanne; Eisend, Martin (2 October 2015). "Advertising Repetition: A Meta-Analysis on Effective Frequency in Advertising". Journal of Advertising. 44 (4): 415–428. doi:10.1080/00913367.2015.1018460. S2CID 143974202.
- Eisend, Martin; Tarrahi, Farid (September 2014). "Meta-analysis selection bias in marketing research". International Journal of Research in Marketing. 31 (3): 317–326. doi:10.1016/j.ijresmar.2014.03.006.
- Eisend, Martin; Küster, Franziska (December 2011). "The effectiveness of publicity versus advertising: a meta-analytic investigation of its moderators". Journal of the Academy of Marketing Science. 39 (6): 906–921. doi:10.1007/s11747-010-0224-3. S2CID 167314161.
- Eisend, Martin (August 2010). "A meta-analysis of gender roles in advertising". Journal of the Academy of Marketing Science. 38 (4): 418–440. doi:10.1007/s11747-009-0181-x. S2CID 145124603.
- Eisend, Martin (June 2009). "A meta-analysis of humor in advertising". Journal of the Academy of Marketing Science. 37 (2): 191–203. doi:10.1007/s11747-008-0096-y. S2CID 144010592.
- Eisend, Martin (June 2006). "Two-sided advertising: A meta-analysis". International Journal of Research in Marketing. 23 (2): 187–198. doi:10.1016/j.ijresmar.2005.11.001.

=== Books ===
- Eisend, Martin & Alfred Kuß (2021), Grundlagen empirischer Forschung. Zur Methodologie der Betriebswirtschaftslehre, 2. Aufl., Wiesbaden: Springer-Gabler. ISBN 978-3-658-32889-4
- Eisend, Martin (2020), Metaanalyse, 2. Aufl., München: Rainer Hampp. ISBN 978-3-95710-267-6
- Eisend, Martin & Alfred Kuss (2019), Research Methodology in Marketing. Theory Development, Empirical Approaches and Philosophy of Science Considerations, Cham: Springer Na-ture. ISBN 978-3-030-10794-9
