= Master of Business Informatics =

Master of Business Informatics (MBI) is a postgraduate degree in Business Informatics (BI). BI programs combine information technology (IT) and management courses and are common in central Europe. The first master programs in Business Informatics were offered by the University of Rostock, as a face-to-face program, and by the Virtual Global University (VGU) together with the European University Viadrina Frankfurt (Oder) as an online program (see virtual education). An MBI programme, which includes inter-cultural studies affecting business operations in European markets, was first offered by Dublin City University. Within the Bologna process, many Central European universities have been, or are in the process of, setting up master programmes in Business Informatics. Due to legal frameworks and restrictions, however, most of these programs are forced to award an M.Sc. degree instead of an MBI degree.

== Example ==
A typical MBI program is the VGU's "International Master of Business Informatics" program in Germany. Since this program was set up and accredited in accordance with nationwide guidelines for content and structure, it reflects well the state-of-the-art of Business Informatics master programs. If studied full-time, the MBI program is a four-semester program and can be composed of courses from the following areas of study. Another typical MBI program is the MIAGE (Méthodes Informatiques Appliquées à la Gestion des Entreprises) program in France, present in more than 20 universities (MIAGE Toulouse, MIAGE Nancy, MIAGE Paris Ouest Nanterre La Défense, MIAGE Dauphine, MIAGE Aix-Marseille, MIAGE Grenoble Alpes, MIAGE Sorbonne, MIAGE Lille, MIAGE Rennes, MIAGE Bordeaux). Some MBI programs are organized in tracks or profiles, guiding the students in the design of their master study plan. This is the case of the "Master in Business Informatics" in Utrecht University, which allows students to specialize in one of the following four career areas: business consultant (provides business advice from an ICT perspective), IT consultant (provides ICT advice from a business perspective), entrepreneur (independent entrepreneur who develops ICT products), and IT researcher (continuing with a PhD or targeting a research and development department in a software company).

== Typical areas of study ==
- Basic Technology:

Courses may include topics like applied computer science, computer networks and Internet technology, website engineering, programming, or information security.

- Business Informatics Methods:

Courses may focus on information systems development, database management, information systems architectures, business intelligence, or business process modelling.

- Management:

Management oriented topics may be studied in courses on management information systems, information management, project management, management control, knowledge management, management and organization of IT departments, or software engineering management.

- Applications:

Important application domains of Business Informatics may be investigated in courses like enterprise resource planning, e-commerce and e-business networking, industrial information systems, or electronic finance/electronic banking.

== Typical positions for MBI graduates ==
Graduates in Business Informatics can fill positions like information manager, systems analyst, systems designer, project manager, business solutions developer, IT entrepreneur, IS specialist, consultant in areas like enterprise resource planning, supply chain management, customer relationship management, or knowledge management.

== See also ==
- Virtual Global University
- Virtual education
- Virtual University
- Business Informatics
