= Erdmann Copernicus =

Erdmann Copernicus (born in the 1520s in Gransee, Margraviate of Brandenburg; † 25 August 1573 in Frankfurt (Oder)) was a German poet, composer, and jurist mainly active in the Margraviate or Electorate of Brandenburg, a precursor to Prussia.

Similar to the unrelated astronomer Nicolaus Copernicus (1473–1543), his name is documented in several partially Latinized variants: Erdmann/Erdmannus/Ertmannus/Erdmanus Kopernikus/Copernicus.

== Life ==
On 4 May 1545 he joined the University of Wittenberg in Saxony as Ertmannus Copernicus Granselensis, and graduated on 25 February 1546 as Magister of philosophy. For winter semester 1546-47 he returned to Brandenburg to continue his studies at the state university in Frankfurt (Oder), named Alma Mater Viadrina after the river Oder. Moved upstream in 1811 and merged with the university in Breslau where WW2 put an end to it in 1945, it was in 1991 re-established in Frankfurt/Oder as European University Viadrina.

After being a school principal in the New Town district of Brandenburg an der Havel, Copernicus in 1556 continued law studies at University of Wittenberg until he was appointed professor in Frankfurt/Oder upon the recommendation of Philipp Melanchthon. Being popular among students, they petitioned Joachim II Hector, Elector of Brandenburg (1505-1571) with verses in Latin for a raise of Copernicus' salary.

On 21 April 1573, after having been the university's vice rector during the winter semester, he was promoted to Doctor of Law, and also to head of university for the summer semester of 1573, during which he died. His hymns were published posthumously in 1575.

== Work ==
- Hymni Ambrosii, Sedulii, Propertii et aliorum, quator vocum.
- Poems: Gedichte. In: Petrus Albinus, 1535–1598. Meißnische Land vnd Berg-Chronica. Dresden. 1589 (Commend. poems 448) by Erdmannus Copernicus microformguides.gale.com (PDF; 1,1 MB).
- Johannes Schosser: Elegia Viadri ad albim continens gratulationem … Eichorn, 1560.
- Ludolph Schrader: Gamēlion Erdmani Copernici scriptum, … Eichorn, 1560.
- Oratio de prima ivris origine progressionibus & incrementis …, Eichorn, 1561.
- Michael Haslobius, Henricus Iagow: In honorem clarissimi viri … Eichorn, 1563.

== Literature ==
- Heinz Scheible (ed.): Melanchthons Briefwechsel. Kritische und kommentierte Gesamtausgabe. Band 11: Personen. Teil: A–E. Frommann-Holzboog, Stuttgart u. a. 2003, ISBN 3-7728-2257-6, S. 301.
- Johann Heinrich Zedler: Grosses vollständiges Universal-Lexicon at wikisource
- Robert Eitner: Biographisch-bibliographisches Quellen-Lexikon der Musiker und Musikgelehrten Christlicher Zeitrechnung bis Mitte des neunzehnten Jahrhunderts. 1900. Akademische Druck- u. Verlaganstalt, Graz 1959 (Biographisch-bibliographisches Quellen-Lexikon der Musiker und Musikgelehrten der christlichen Zeitrechnung bis zur Mitte des neunzehnten Jahrhunderts at the Internet Archive).
- François-Joseph Fétis: Biographie universelle des musiciens: et bibliographie generale de la musique. Firmin-Didot, Paris 1875–1883, Band II, S. 355 (gallica.bnf.fr).
- Ernst Ludwig Gerber: Neues historisch-biographisches Lexikon der Tonkünstler, welches Nachrichten von dem Leben und den Werken musikalischer Schriftsteller, berühmter Komponisten, Sänger, Meister auf Instrumenten, kunstvoller Dilettanten, Musikverleger, auch Orgel- und Instrumentenmacher älterer und neuerer Zeit aus allen Nationen enthält. Erster Theil A–D, M. Kühnel, Leipzig 1812, Sp. 777 books.google.de
- Christian Gottlieb Jöcher: Allgemeines Gelehrten-Lexicon ("General Dictionary of the Learned") in four volumes, published 1733–1751, archive
