= European University Viadrina =

University in Germany

- Europa-Universität Viadrina
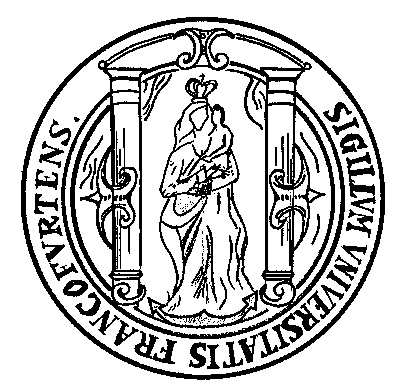
- Latin: Alma Mater Viadrina
- Motto: Ex oriente lux
- Motto in English: Light from the east
- Type: Public
- Established: 1506, closed 1811, refounded 1991
- President: Eduard Mühle
- Academic staff: 579
- Students: 6,647
- Location: Frankfurt (Oder), Brandenburg, Germany; 52°20′32″N 14°33′14″E
- Campus: Urban, several locations
- Website: www.europa-uni.de

European University Viadrina Frankfurt (Oder) (German: Europa-Universität Viadrina Frankfurt (Oder)) is a university located at Frankfurt (Oder) in Brandenburg, Germany. It is also known as the University of Frankfurt (Oder). The city is on the Oder River, which marks the border between Germany and Poland. With 5,200 students — around 1,000 of whom come from Poland — and some 160 teaching staff, the Viadrina is one of Germany's smallest universities (only the University of Erfurt and Jacobs University Bremen have fewer students).

The Latin word Viadrina means "belonging to, or situated at, the Oder River"; it derives from Viadrus, the name of a presumed river god of the Oder. Actually, an ancient name of the river is not documented, it is mentioned as Oddera in the 991 Dagome iudex referring to the realm of Prince Mieszko I of Poland. The Latin name was probably introduced by the Frankfurt scholar Jodocus Willich (c.1486–1552) and appeared in the Cosmographia by Sebastian Münster in 1544; the city of Frankfurt was known in Latin as Francofortum ad Viadrum.

== Alma Mater Viadrina (1506–1811) ==
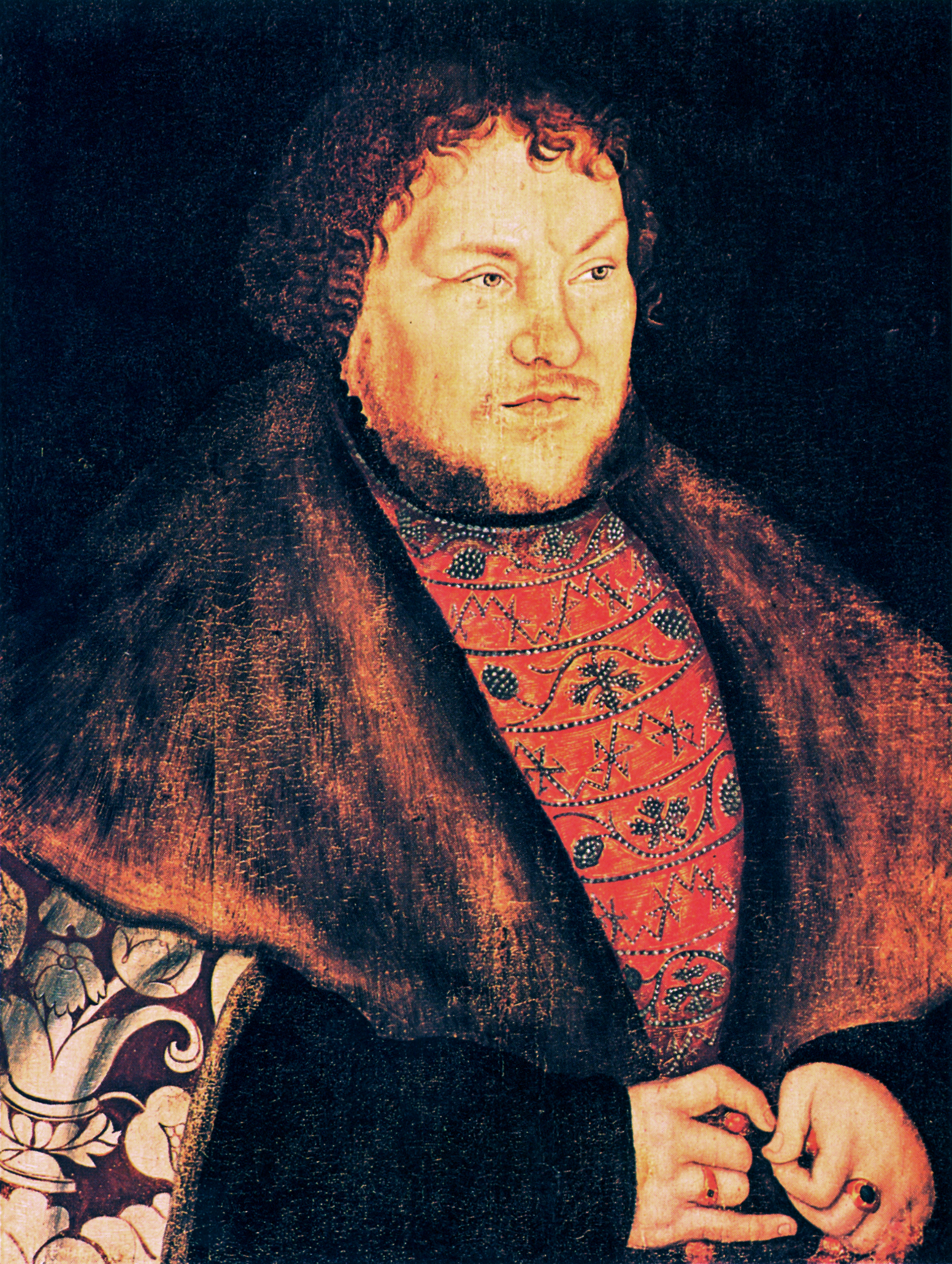
Elector Joachim I Nestor, portrait by Lucas Cranach the Elder

The Alma Mater Viadrina was founded on 26 April 1506 by Elector Joachim I Nestor, with permission from Pope Julius II, as the first principal university of the Margraviate of Brandenburg. The foundation stone was laid already in 1498 at the site of a demolished synagogue; a foundation charter was issued by Pope Alexander VI in the same year. The notable theologian Konrad Wimpina (c.1465–1531) became founding prorector. Construction of the main building (Collegienhaus) was completed in 1507.

The university was organized into four Faculties of Arts: law, theology, philosophy, and medicine. Within the first year, more than 900 students from all over Germany, Poland, Sweden, Norway, and Denmark enrolled. The Viadrina enjoyed an excellent reputation in Brandenburg and the surrounding regions, and its graduates had high positions in administration, politics, law and the church.

One of its earliest chancellors, Bishop Georg von Blumenthal (1490–1550) was a vigorous opponent of the Protestant Reformation and did his utmost to expel Lutherans such as Jodocus Willich. (In 2018 his brother's direct descendant Julia von Blumenthal was named president of the refounded Viadrina.) In 1518 Johann Tetzel (1465–1519) obtained his doctorate at Frankfurt. Nevertheless, the university, like its Prussian counterpart, the University of Königsberg established in 1544, turned to Lutheran orthodoxy. A professor popular among students, Erdmann Copernicus, was promoted to head of university in 1573, but died in the same year.

After the ruling House of Hohenzollern had converted to Calvinism, the 'Great Elector' Frederick William and his governor Prince John Maurice of Nassau-Siegen in 1655 founded the University of Duisburg, a Reformed college in the Duchy of Cleves.

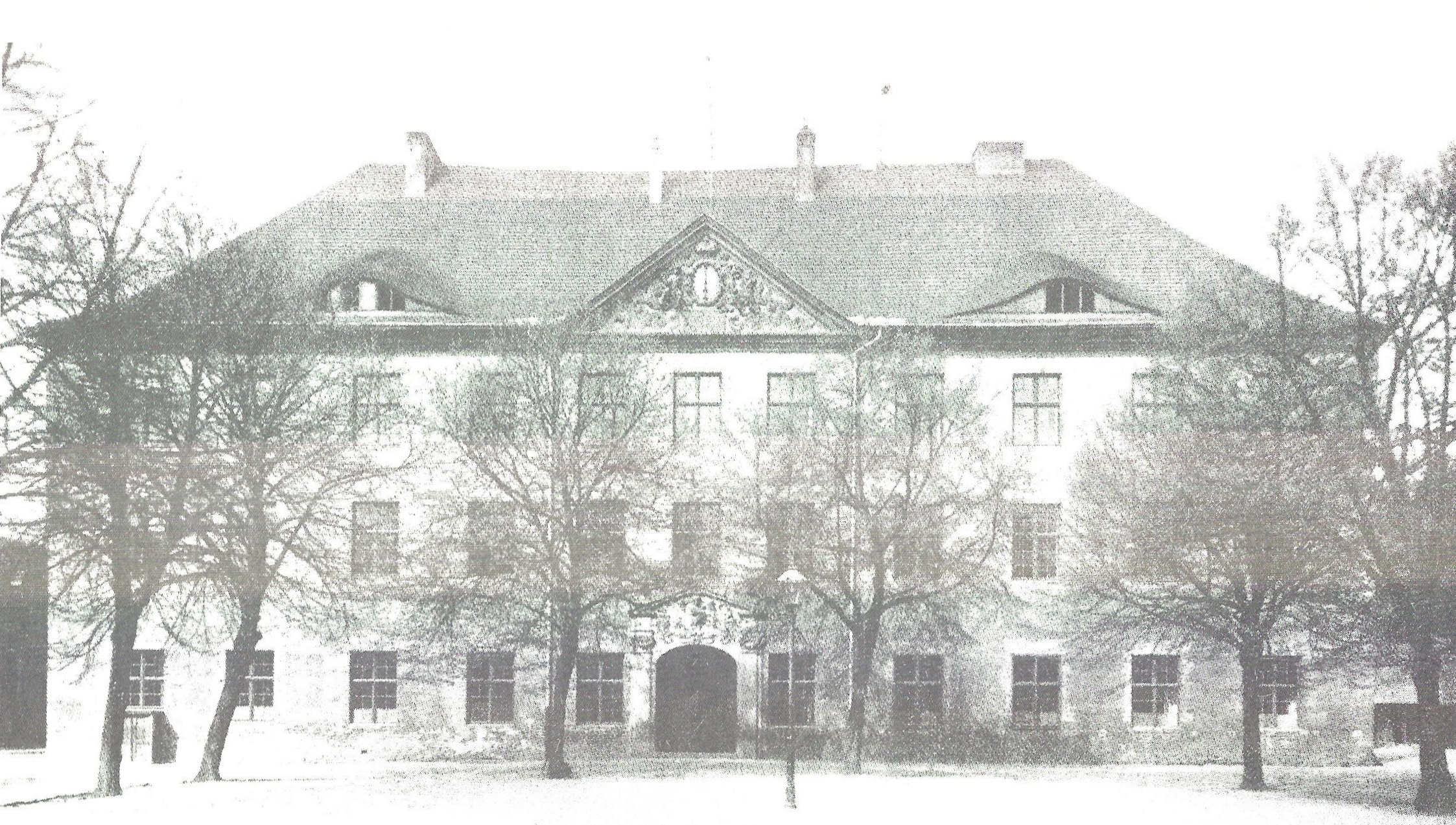
Old Collegienhaus (1911)

Frederick William also opened the Frankfurt University for Jewish students, against fierce resistance by the teaching staff. While damages of the Thirty Years' War still had to be repaired, he had a botanical garden laid out next to the university premises. An anatomical theatre was built in 1684 at the behest of physician Bernhardus Albinus (1653–1721). The complete renovation was accomplished in 1693/94.

In 1736 the eminent jurist Johann Jakob Moser was called to head the Faculty of Law at the university, but had to leave after three years due to his thoroughly Liberal ideas which were disliked by the Prussian king Frederick William I.

In the course of the Prussian Reforms during the Napoleonic Wars, the University of Frankfurt was moved to Breslau (present-day Wrocław, Poland) in 1811. It merged with the University of Breslau, the Leopoldina established in 1702 by the Habsburg emperor Leopold I, in order to be competitive with the newly founded University of Berlin. The merger included the transfer of the comprehensive library stocks, then with more than 28,000 volumes the second-largest in Prussia after the Königsberg State and University Library collection, up the Oder river by boat. Some of the Viadrina professors did, however, accept positions in Berlin.

The old university building was taken over by the City of Frankfurt and turned into a schoolhouse. It was barely damaged in World War II and first used as a home for refugees from the former eastern territories. Afterwards the building stood empty until it was controversially demolished in the early 1960s. Only the arch of the main entrance has been preserved as a monument.

Famous students at the historical Viadrina included the philosopher Ulrich von Hutten (1488–1523) and the theologian and political leader Thomas Müntzer (c. 1489–1525), the musician Carl Philipp Emanuel Bach (1714–1788), the physicians Marcus Elieser Bloch (1723–1799) and Johann Gottlieb Walter (1734–1818), Wilhelm (1767–1836) and Alexander von Humboldt (1769–1859), as well as the poet Heinrich von Kleist (1777–1811). Among the notable university prorectors was Duke Henry Wenceslaus of Oels-Bernstadt (1592–1639) in 1608.

== New Viadrina ==
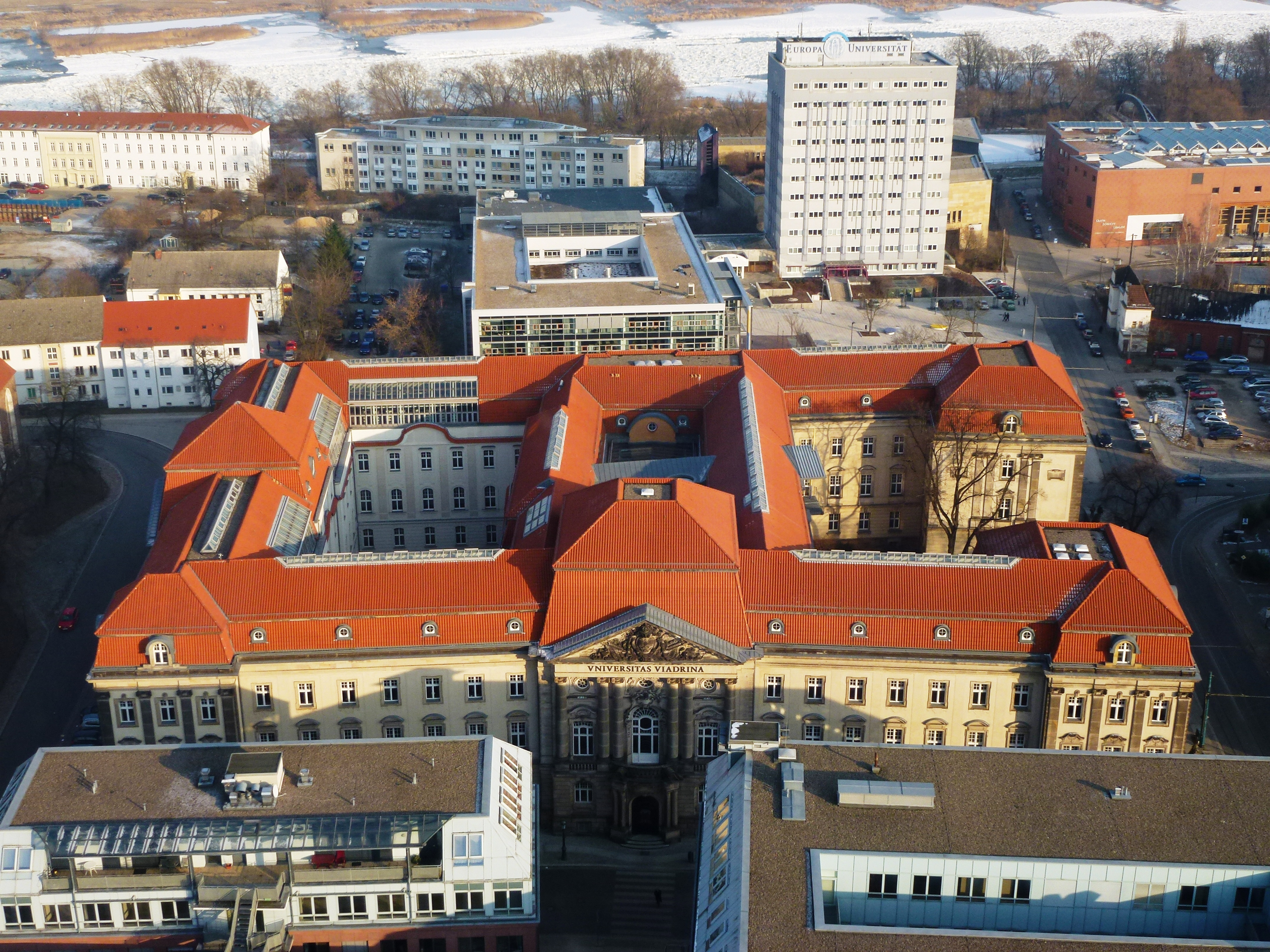
Red-tiled Viadrina main building, ex regional Government House, seen from Oderturm 2012

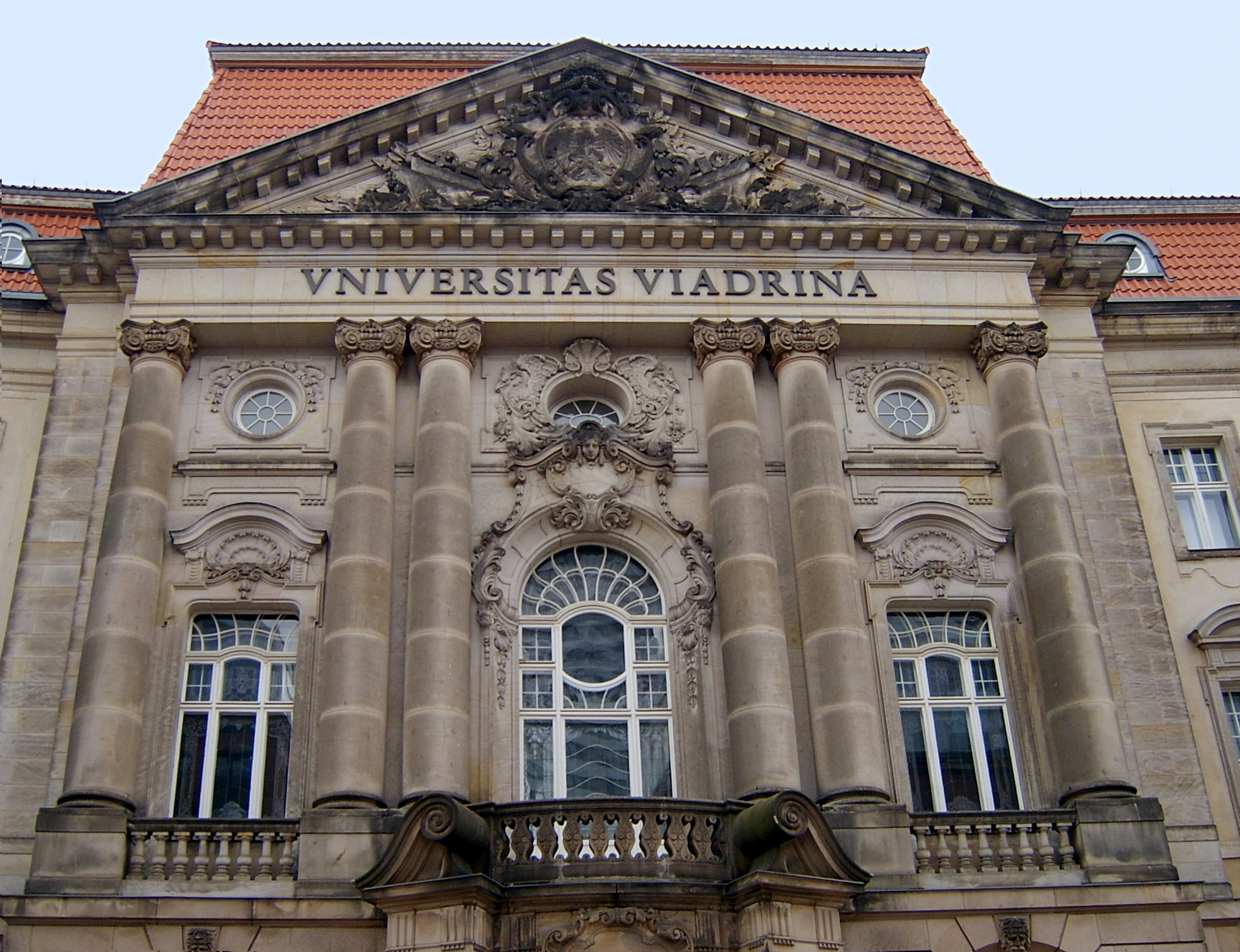
The front portal of the main building of the Viadrina

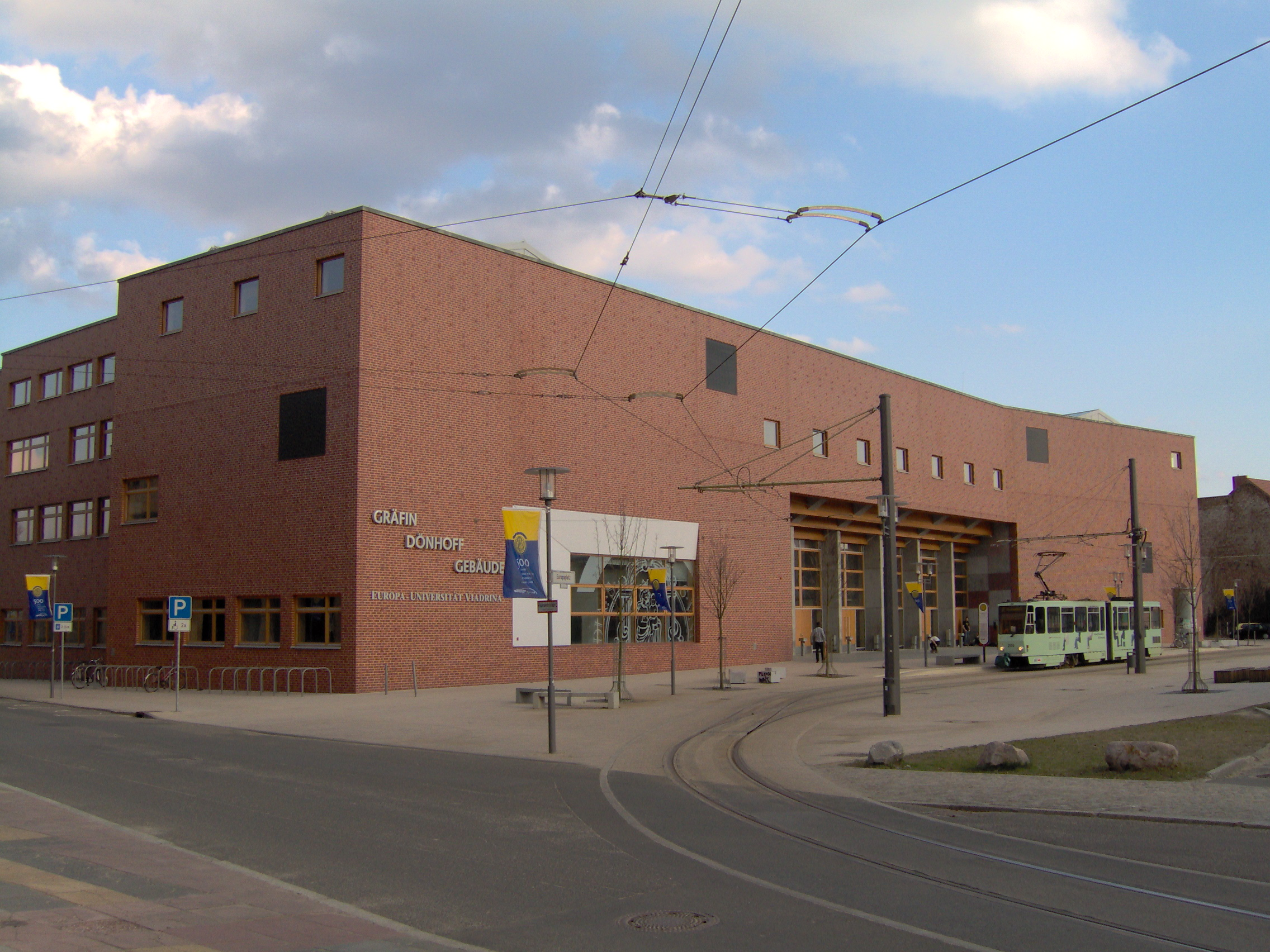
The Countess Dönhoff Building houses lecture rooms and the dining hall

The south side of the main building (built 1898–1906), showing the Oderturm in the background

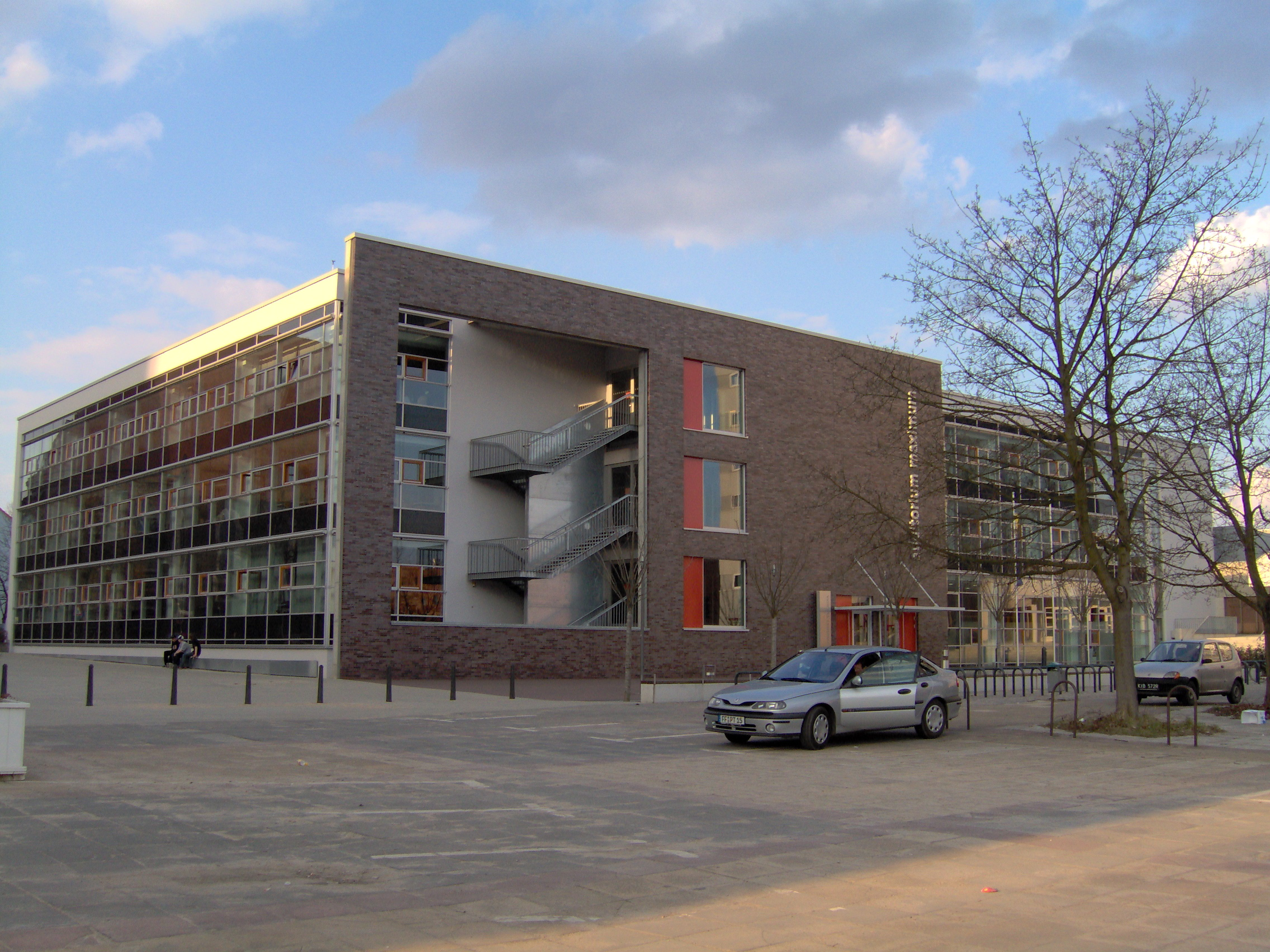
The Audimax building, known colloquially as the Flachbau ("flat building"), is a modernized GDR-era building that houses the university auditorium

In 1991 the university was re-established as Viadrina European University. It currently comprises three faculties: Economics and Business Studies; Law; and Cultural Studies. A prime focus of the educational program is to attract students from throughout Europe in order to create a multinational student body. Currently about 40 percent of the students are foreigners (mostly Polish), a greater proportion than at other German universities.

Viadrina European University maintains close cooperation with Adam Mickiewicz University in Poznań, Poland. The two universities jointly operate the Collegium Polonicum, located just opposite Viadrina on the Polish side of the Oder River.

Notable among the research institutions at Viadrina University is the Frankfurt Institute of Transformational Studies (FIT). The institute is a substantial contributor to research on economies in transition.

The university's former president, Professor Gesine Schwan, ran for President of Germany both in 2004 and 2009, being narrowly defeated by Horst Köhler twice. Former diplomat Gunter Pleuger has served as the university's president since 1 October 2008. Pleuger was followed by slavicist Alexander Wöll on 1 October 2014.

== Study programs ==
The Viadrina European University currently offers the following study programs in English:

- Bachelor of International Business Administration
- Bachelor of Cultural Studies
- Master of International Business Administration
- Master of Business Informatics in cooperation with the Virtual Global University
- Master of Business Administration (MBA)
- Master of Information and Operations Management
- Master of Law in International Human Rights and Humanitarian Law (LL.M.)
- Master of European Studies (MES)
- Master of Culture and History of Eastern and Central Europe
- Master of European Cultural Heritage (MEK)

== Notable faculty and alumni ==
- Carl Philipp Emanuel Bach
- Alexander Gottlieb Baumgarten
- Karl August von Bergen
- Erdmann Copernicus
- Martin Eisend
- Johann Gottlieb Gleditsch
- Alexander von Humboldt
- Wilhelm von Humboldt
- Ulrich von Hutten
- Heinrich von Kleist
- Thomas Müntzer
- Andreas Musculus
- Ludwig von Pfuel
- Garlieb Sillem
- Min (Vietnamese singer)

== See also ==
- List of medieval universities
