= Johannes Micraelius =

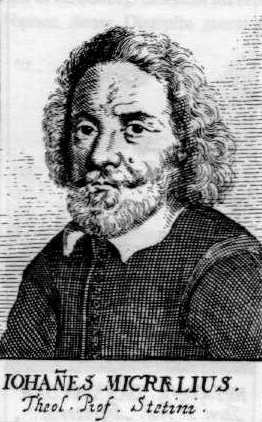

Johannes Micraelius, actually Johannes Lütkeschwager, (Köslin, 1 September 1597 – Stettin, 3 December 1658) was a German poet, philosopher, and historiographer.

== Life ==
Johannes Micraelius was a son to Joachim Lütkeschwager (d. 1619), who originated from Jamund and was an archdeacon in Köslin. As usual among the humanists of his time, Joachim adopted a Latin family name, in the form of Micraelius. Esther (1600–1665), Johannes' sister, was married to the famous theologian Jacobus Fabricius.

Johannes went to school in his native town, before continuing his studies at the Stettin pedagogy. In 1617, he started his higher education at the University of Königsberg. Consequently, in 1624, Johannes was given a professorship in rhetoric at the University of Greifswald. In 1639, he was named rector at the Ratsschule in Stettin. During this period, Micraelius wrote his six books on the history of Pomerania, which he had printed by the Stettin publisher Georg Rhete. In 1641, he accepted the position of rector at the royal pedagogy of Stettin. In the same year, he was named professor in theology and philosophy.

In 1649, Micraelius graduated in theology at the University of Greifswald. He started a career there, ending up being pro-chancellor of the university in 1656. During his academic career, he wrote a number of tragedies and comedies, inspired by themes from classical antiquity. However, his most proclaimed works would be his historical and theological publications. Finally, his 1653 Lexicon philosophicum became very popular, even launching the term ontology (even though he only used it in Greek characters).

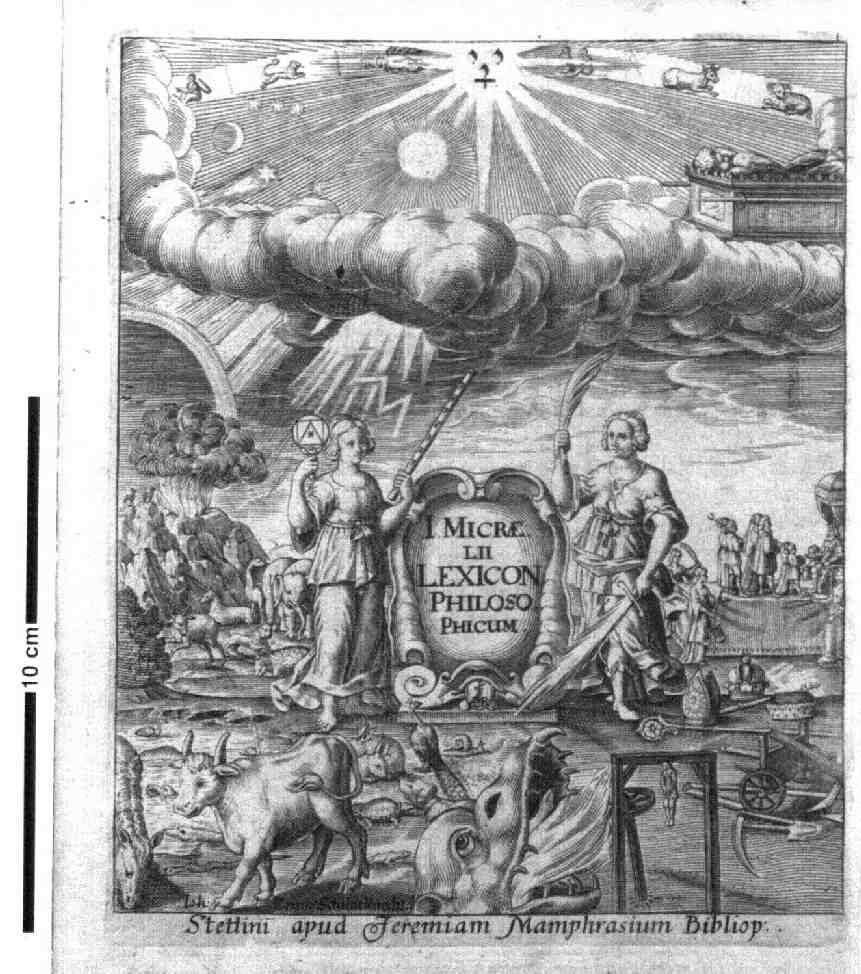
Lexicon philosophicum terminorum philosophis usitatorum (1653)

== Works ==
- Syntagma historiarum ecclesiae, 1630
- Tragico-Comoedia Nova de Pomeride a Lastevio afflicta, 1631
- Parthenia, Pomeridos continuatio: ein New Comoedien Spiel, 1631
- Sechs Bücher vom alten Pommernland, 1639 to 1640
  - 1st book: Johannis Micraelii Erstes Buch Deß Alten Pommer-Landes
  - 2nd book: Johannis Micraelii Ander Buch Deß Alten Wendischen Pommerlandes
  - 3rd book: Johannis Micraelii Drittes Buch Deß Alten Sächsischen Pommerlandes
  - 4th book: Johannis Micraelii Erstes Theil Der Letzten Pommerschen Jahr-Geschichten ... Und also Das Vierdte Buch Vom PommerLande
  - 5th book: Johannis Micraelii Fünfftes Buch Der Pommerschen Jahr-Geschichten
  - 6th book: Johannis Micraelii Sechstes und Letztes Buch / Von deß Pommerlandes Gelegenheit und Einwohnern
- Oratio inauguralis de animorum morbis et medicina, 1642
- Ethnopronius tribus dialogorum libris, 1647
- Aphorismi de regia politici scientia, 1647
- De methodo in disciplinis, 1648
- De inaudita philosophia Joannis Baptistae Helmontii, 1649
- Cosmologia, 1650
- Psychologia, 1650
- Tabellae historicae, 1652
- De mutationibus rerum publicarum earumque causis, praesagiis er curatione, 1652
- Lexicon philosophicum terminorum philosophis usitatorum, 1653
