= Socio-onomastics =

Study of names in a social and cultural context

Socio-onomastics is the study of names through a sociolinguistic lens, and is part of the broader topic of onomastics. Socio-onomastics 'examines the use and variety of names through methods that demonstrate the social, cultural, and situational conditions in name usage'. As a discipline, it aims to explore 'the social origin and use of different variants of proper names within various situations and contexts', including both place names and personal names.

The term stems from the German Sozioonomastik and, first emerging among German thinkers in the early 1970s, it is a much younger subdiscipline of onomastics than many others (e.g. toponymy).

Research can be contemporary, with data collected through surveys and ethnographical inquiry of modern societies and communities, or historical, based on historical written sources. Methodologically speaking, socio-onomastics focuses on synchronic variation of names over time and space - why are some names given and others not, why are some so popular, why are some remembered by or applied to certain groups of people or places?

== Notable scholars ==
Socio-onomastic study of nicknames has proved particularly productive. James Skipper Jr., Professor of Sociology, focused on the study of nicknames within typically American cultural groups: baseball players and jazz musicians. Alongside Leslie, his Toward a Theory of Nicknames: A Case for Socio-Onomastics, published in the journal Names, established a number of crucial theoretical concerns.
