= Jodocus Willich =

German physician and writer

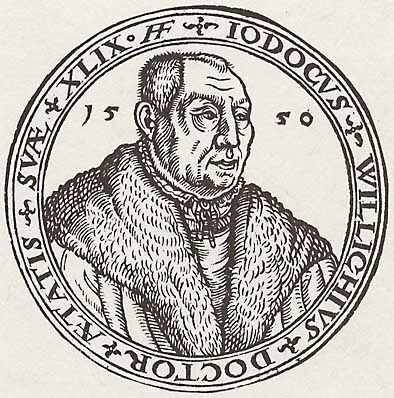
Jodocus Willich (1550)

Jodocus Willich (also Wilke, Wild; 1501 or c. 1486, Rößel –1552) was a German physician and writer.

== Opus ==
- 1543 Problemata De Ebriorvm affectionibus & moribus. Iodoco Willichio authore. Francofordii cis Viadrum Ioannes Hanaw excudebat. (Digitalisat)
- 1549 Studentes, comoedia de vita studiosorum, nunc primum in lucem edita autore M. Christophoro Stummelio, F. Eiusdem carmen de iudicio Paridis. Addita est Praefatio Jodoci Willichii et Epilogus a M. Christophoro Cornero. Francoforti ad Viadrum in officina Joannis Eichorn anno MDXLIX. (Digitalisat.)
- 1550 Wie man denen helffen sol, welche mit der pestilentzische gifft begriffen seind. Durch Doctorem Jodocum Willichium von Resell. Gedruckt zu Franckfort an der Oder durch Johann Eichorn. M.D.L. (Digitalisat)
