= Business informatics =

Discipline

Business Informatics (BI) is a discipline combining economics, the economics of digitization, business administration, accounting, internal auditing, information technology (IT), and concepts of computer science. Business informatics centers on creating software and hardware systems, which ultimately enable the organization to operate effectively through information technology applications. The focus on programming and equipment boosts the value of the analysis of economics and information technology. The BI discipline was created in Germany (in German: Wirtschaftsinformatik). It is an established academic discipline, including bachelor, master's, diploma, and PhD programs in Austria, Belgium, Egypt, France, Germany, Hungary, Ireland, The Netherlands, Russia, Slovakia, Sweden, Switzerland, and Turkey, and is establishing itself in an increasing number of other countries as well, including Finland, Australia, Bosnia and Herzegovina, Malaysia, Mexico, Poland, India and South Africa.

== Business informatics as an integrative discipline ==
Business informatics shares similarities with information systems (IS), a well-established discipline originating in North America. However, there are a few differences that make business informatics a unique discipline:

1. Business informatics includes information technology, along with relevant portions of applied computer science, to a significantly greater extent than information systems do.
2. Business informatics includes significant construction and implementation-oriented elements. Another thing is that one major focus is on developing solutions to business problems rather than on the ex post investigation of their impact.

Information systems (IS) focuses on empirically explaining real-world phenomena. Information systems are said to have an "explanation-oriented" focus, in contrast to the "solution-oriented" focus that dominates business informatics. Information systems researchers make an effort to explain the phenomena of acceptance and influence of IT in organizations and society by applying an empirical approach. To do that, usually qualitative and quantitative empirical studies are conducted and evaluated. In contrast to that, business informatics researchers mainly focus on the creation of IT solutions for challenges they have observed or assumed, and thereby they focus more on the possible future uses of IT.

Tight integration between research and teaching, following the Humboldtian ideal, is a major goal in business informatics. Insights gained from actual research projects quickly become part of the curriculum, since most researchers are also lecturers. The pace of scientific and technological progress in business informatics is quite rapid; therefore, subjects taught are under permanent reconsideration and revision. In its evolution, the business informatics discipline is fairly young. Therefore, significant hurdles must be overcome to establish its vision further.

== Career prospects ==
Specialists in business informatics can work both in research and in commerce. In business, there are various uses, which may vary depending on professional experience. Fields of employment and roles may include:

- Management Consulting
- Information Technology Consulting
- IT Account manager
- Systems Analysis
- Business Analyst
- IT Project Manager
- IT Auditor
- Solution Architect
- Software Architect
- Systems Architect
- Enterprise Architect
- Information Technology Management

In consulting, a clear line must be drawn between strategic and IT consulting.

== Tertiary Institutions Providing Business Informatics Degree ==
- Hanover University of Applied Sciences and Arts
- University of Louisiana at Lafayette
- Idaho State University
- Northern Kentucky College
- University of South Africa (Unisa)
- University of Mannheim

There are more and more universities and community colleges providing business informatics degrees.

== Journal ==
Business & Information Systems Engineering

== See also ==
- Bachelor of Business Information Systems
- Master of Business Informatics
