= List of free geology software =

This is a list of free and open-source software for geological data handling and interpretation. The list is split into broad categories, depending on the intended use of the software and its scope of functionality.

Notice that 'free and open-source' requires that the source code is available and users are given a free software license. Simple being 'free of charge' is not sufficient—see gratis versus libre.

== Well logging & Borehole visualisation ==
Name	Description	Originator	License	Platforms	Language	Notes
SGS-Geobase	Drilling data logger that can interface with SGS Genesis	SGS Canada Inc.	GPL	Windows & Microsoft Access	Microsoft Access VBA	Microsoft Access is not necessary, the free runtime is sufficient. Simple graphical interface, Integrity reinforcement, Reporting tools, Satellite Database, Database Validation, Assays QA/QC management with graphics.
QGeoloGIS	QGIS well log and timeseries visualisation plugin	Oslandia, Orano and CEA	GPLv2 or later	Cross-platform	Python	Interfaces with QGIS
OpenGeoPlotter	Mineral exploration drill hole data visualization and cross section generator, strip logs, stereonet		GPL	Cross-platform	Python	Open source PyQt5 app catered to the exploration industry
OpenLog	QGIS plugin for drillhole data visualization, cross-sections, strip-logs, stereonets, downhole imagery, time series, automated imports. Includes a FOSS Spatialite and PostgresSQL database	Apeiron and Oslandia	GPLv2	Cross-platform	Python	Interfaces with QGIS and XplorDB. Connects to Geotic databases. Replaces and supersedes QGeoloGIS

== Geosciences software platforms ==
Name	Description	Originator	License	Platforms	Language	Notes
GeoTriple for Oil&Gas Exploration	Geo-sciences Software platform (data management, display and process)	Geoforge project	LGPL	Cross-platform	Java	Interfaces with WorldWind and JFreeChart

== Geostatistics ==
Name	Description	Originator	License	Platforms	Language	Notes
Gstat	Geostatistical modeling and simulation	Utrecht University	GPL	Cross-platform	C/C++	Interfaces with GRASS
gslib	Geostatistical modeling and simulation	Stanford University	MIT		Fortran 77	
PyGSLIB	Python module for geostatistical modeling, designed for mineral resource estimation	Opengeostat Consulting	MIT/GPL	Windows, Linux and OSX	Fortran 95, Cython and Python	It has functions for drillhole calculations, block modeling, wireframing and geostatistics with modified gslib code linked into python
gstlearn	Geostatistics and Machine Learning Toolbox	MINES Paris - PSL	BSD/GPL	Windows, Linux and OSX	C++ (BSD), Python (BSD) and R (GPL)	
Geone	Geostatistical estimation and simulation	CHYN - University of Neuchâtel		Cross-platform	C and Python	

== Forward modeling ==
Name	Description	Originator	License	Platforms	Language	Notes
Virtual Geoscience Workbench	Finite-discrete element modeler	Jiansheng Xiang and others	LGPL	Windows	C#, C++	

== Geomodeling ==
Name	Description	Originator	License	Platforms	Language	Notes
GeoSyntax	Reservoir modeling	CSIRO Australia - June Hill	CSIRO "MIT/BSD" (academic)	Microsoft Windows	Java	
GeoBlock	Reservoir modeling	Pavel Vassiliev	MPL	Microsoft Windows	Object Pascal	Exact terms not clear
GeoTrace	Tracer modeling	Muhammed Celik		Microsoft Windows	Visual Basic	Exact terms not clear
Albion	3D model reconstruction and visualisation from boreholes based on QGIS GIS Platform	Oslandia and Areva	GPLv2 or later	Cross-platform	Python	Interfaces with QGIS
GemPy	3D structural geological modeling	CGRE Institute, RWTH Aachen - Miguel de la Varga	LGPL v3	Cross-platform	Python	Open-source implicit geological modeling that allows for automation of model construction and is aimed to enable the implementation of probabilistic machine-learning methods, e.g. for uncertainty analysis.
ArchPy	3D automated hierarchical stochastic geological	CHYN - University of Neuchâtel - Ludovic Schorpp	GPLv3.0	Cross-platform	Python	Hierarchical workflow that allows to model geology at different scales (structural, lithological and physical properties). Also supports many stochastic algorithms for efficient uncertainty quantification

== Visualization, interpretation & analysis packages ==
Name	Description	Originator	License	Platforms	Language	Notes
Dapple	Virtual globe for geoscientists	Geosoft Inc.	MIT	Windows		Originated in NASA World Wind
Estereografica Web	Stereographic projection and fault kinematics	Reyuntec	Public domain	Cross-platform	ASP.net	Free web application (english and spanish)
Generic Mapping Tools	Map generation and analysis	Lamont–Doherty and University of Hawaii	GPL	Cross-platform	C	Implemented in OpendTect
GPlates	Interactive visualization of plate tectonics	University of Sydney, Caltech, NGU	GPL	Cross-platform	C++, Python	Implements GPML
OpenStereo	Geoscience plotting tool	Carlos Grohmann, University of São Paulo	GPL	Cross-platform	Python	Depends on NumPy and Matplotlib
OpendTect	Geoscience interpretation and visualization	dGB Earth Sciences	GPL or custom	Cross-platform	C++	Interfaces with GMT
Modelgeo	Petroleum geology and general 3D mathematics, for scripted calculations, gridding, depth conversion, prospect analysis and 3D visualization	ModelGeo AS	Free for non-profit use	Windows	C++, TCL	Reads all common geology and geophysics data formats
ParaViewGeo	Geoscience extension of ParaView Includes readers and filters	Kitware ParaView, Objectivity Originally MIRARCO	BSD	Cross-platform	C++, Python	Adds specific readers, stereo toolbar, slideshow capability and mining and geology oriented filters to Paraview
PuffinPlot	Paleomagnetic data visualization and analysis	Pontus Lurcock	GPL v3	Cross-platform	Java	Desktop GUI and Jython scripting interface.
geoh5py library	Python library for the manipulation and storage of a wide range of geoscientific data (points, curve, surface, 2D and 3D grids) in geoh5 file format, natively supported by Geoscience ANALYST free 3D viewer	Mira Geoscience Ltd.	LPGL 3.0	Cross-platform	Python	Documentation and tutorials fully available in ReadTheDocs
geoapps repository	The geoapps repository are open-source geoscientific applications in Python, including geophysical data processing, modelling, and inversion codes	Mira Geoscience Ltd.	MIT	Cross-platform	Python	Documentation and tutorials fully available in ReadTheDocs
stratapy	A Python-based framework for automated visualisation of creating standardised, reproducible, and digitally integrated stratigraphic logs.	Jack Lee Smith and others	BSD	Cross-platform	Python	Documentation and tutorials fully available in ReadTheDocs

== Geographic information systems (GIS) ==
This important class of tools is already listed in the article List of GIS software.

== Not true free and open-source projects ==
The following projects have unknown licensing, licenses or other conditions which place some restriction on use or redistribution, or which depend on non-open-source software like MATLAB or XVT (and therefore do not meet the Open Source Definition from the Open Source Initiative).

Name	Description	Originator	License	Platforms	Language	Notes
Noddy	3D geological and geophysical modeling	Tectask, IUGS	Custom permissive license	Microsoft Windows	C++	Uses proprietary XVT libraries; requires (free) registration
BasinVis,	Basin visualization of sedimentary fill and subsidence	Eun Young Lee, Johannes Novotny	LICENSE	Cross-platform	Matlab	
Geomodelr	Geological modelling from cross sections	Geomodelr, Inc.	SaaS - AGPL	Cross-platform	Python	Allows creation of public geological models in its web platform for free and query the model with an Open Source Python Package
BGS Groundhog Desktop	Geological modelling from cross sections	British Geological Survey	OGL - Open Government Licence	MS Windows	Java	Free to use software to digitize geological cross-sections, and display and edit borehole logs
Geoscience ANALYST	Free 3D visualization and communication software for integrated, multi-disciplinary geoscience and mining data and models, which also connects to Python through geoh5py, its open-source API	Mira Geoscience Ltd.	Free / Proprietary	Microsoft Windows	C++	Free license key is automatically emailed upon request, and the software is permanently free
GEOREKA	3D Geological Modelling software combining traditional techniques with modern Machine Learning. The attractive and intuitive 3D Viewer is Free. It imports a large variety of data and has attractive 3D and Section views.	GEOREKA Technologies GmbH	Free / Proprietary	MS Windows	C++	Free Trial automatically becomes Free Viewer after the trial period.
