= Emigma =

EMIGMA
- Developer: Petros Eikon Incorporated
- Release: March 1994; 32 years ago
- Stable release: V9.1 / October 2016; 9 years ago
- Operating system: Windows 95 and later
- License: Proprietary non-transferable
- Website: www.petroseikon.com/emigma

EMIGMA is a geophysics interpretation software platform developed by Petros Eikon Incorporated for data processing, simulation, inversion and imaging as well as other associated tasks. The software focuses on non-seismic applications and operates only on the Windows operating system. It supports files standard to the industry, instrument native formats as well as files used by other software in the industry such as AutoCAD, Google Earth and Oasis montaj. There is a free version of EMIGMA called EMIGMA Basic developed to allow viewing of databases created by licensed users. It does not allow data simulation nor modeling nor data import. The software is utilized by geoscientists for exploration and delineating purposes in mining, oil and gas and groundwater as well as hydrologists, environmental engineers, archaeologists and academic institutions for research purposes. Principal contributors to the software are R. W. Groom, H. Wu, E. Vassilenko, R. Jia, C. Ottay and C. Alvarez.

== EMIGMA tools ==
=== Forward simulation of geophysical models ===
These applications were the initial motivation for the platform and are still given attention in new releases.

Geological models can be simulated for a variety of geophysical measurement systems such as conventional dipole-dipole, FEM, time domain electromagnetics(TEM), Magnetotellurics(MT), CSEM/CSAMT, magnetic, gravity, resistivity and induced polarization systems. Surveys can be airborne, ground, down a hole, crosshole, underwater or on the water. A survey is defined by properties related to a transmitter, a receiver and other system properties. The system and survey parameters are stored with the input data allowing the user freedom from continually specifying these parameters for every model. Synthetic measurements at the receiver due to the model are what are calculated during a simulation. Early versions of EMIGMA could simulate the responses of 3D blocks, thin plates and the response of a many layered earth model. Simulation algorithms now include one for a sphere model, and alternate algorithms for thin plates and various algorithms for 3D prisms and polyhedra. Blocks and polyhedra components of a model are simulated by algorithms based on the LN approximation. When compared with a real world electromagnetic system, it has been found that simulation results for a thin plate tended to agree in some situations. One case study required other algorithms for initial analysis of data due to EMIGMA's complexity. EMIGMA was then used when the limitations of the other software was reached. EMIGMA is the only commercial EM modelling tool that can model a thick prism, a complex polyhedra as well as a thin plates. Another advantage is the ability to simulate the response of multiple types of targets on more than one profile.

=== Inversion of geophysical data ===
A model response can be simulated and compared to a measured response adjusted by the user and repeated. But another approach, which is often taken, is to make this process for forward simulation and model adjustment automatic. After enough iterations, a model can be found that has a response that matches the measured response within a limit specified by the user. This is termed inversion. Petros Eikon has been developing inversion processes for almost 2 decades. Initial inversion procedures provided one dimensional (1D)models for frequency domain electromagnetic data both controlled source and natural field for ground and airborne data. Later, capabilities for 3d inversion were added.

1D inversion determines the model for a single station. It is available for FEM, TEM, MT, CSAMT and Resistivity data. This process can be repeated for each station that exists to produce what is termed inversion sections.

3D inversion determines the properties of a model in the form of a network of 3D cells. This tool is available for magnetic, gravity, MT, CSEM, CSAMT and Resistivity data. Petros Eikon has moved from standard steepest descent inversion techniques to a Trust Region technique.

=== 3D visualization ===
The design of a survey, geological model and data can be displayed in 3D. The geometry and parameters of model structures can be edited in 3D space. Measured and synthetic data can be viewed in different formats including vectors, lines, surfaces and contours in association with the models. Results from inversion tools can be displayed as a volume.

=== 2D plotter ===
A plotter designed to analyze geophysical data. Data can be displayed on a 2D axis as a function of time, frequency, position or tx-rx separation. Measured data can be compared with simulated and inverted data by displaying multiple plots on the same axis or calculating a residual plot. Data can be converted to different properties such as apparent resistivity.

=== Survey editor ===
The design of a survey is displayed on a two dimensional X-Y (North/South)display including transmitters and data stations. Data stations and models can be interactively edited. Files from mapping software can be imported to display the survey overlaid on a map. Projections of models can also be displayed. The application allows export to GIS graphic formats.

=== Gridding ===
Multiple data can be interpolated into a multi-dimensional grid to allow viewing of maps of such things as multi-time windows or multi-transmitter receiver settings. Grid cells need not be square but may be rectangular to correspond to different spatial densities of stations and lines. Data can be interpolated to a defined grid and viewed in Grid Presentation and a 3D contour application. Grid Presentation also supports map overlays from other mapping software as well as export to all the common geophysical mapping software.

=== Other tools ===
The data spreadsheet displays survey data in a spreadsheet format. Data can be edited. PseudoShow displays data from a series of points as a cross section by assigning tx-rx separation, frequency or time values to depth. The CDI tool calculates resistivity for frequency domain and helicopter data collected at different transmitter frequencies. Results can be displayed in the CDI viewer that also displays 1d inversion results. The poly generator creates synthetic topography and complex anomalies for modeling. Models can also be imported from CAD applications. FFT processing is available for gravity and magnetic data including derivative generation, windowing and upward/downward continuation. Other tools provide features such as digital and spatial data filtering as well as survey editing.

== Version history ==
=== EMIGMA 1 ===
Released in 1994. DOS application to simulate EM responses of a thin-sheet.

=== EMIGMA 5 ===
Released in 1997. WINDOWS 95/NT application. Simulation of geophysical models for various EM systems such as surface and borehole TDEM, airborne and ground FDEM, IP/Resistivity, Magnetotellurics, and CSAMT as a controlled source application. The earliest commercial example of a 3D modeling CSEM application. Application included plotting and visualization capabilities.

=== EMIGMA 6 ===
This version featured forward simulation, 2D and 3D plotting, contouring, a pseudosection tool, 1d inversion of FEM, MT and CSAMT data and 3D inversion of magnetic data. This design has since been renamed and is now sold as GeoTutor for educational purposes. GeoTutor is now in its 5th version as GeoTutor 5.

=== EMIGMA 7 ===
Released in 2000, EMIGMA 7 changed the manner in which data was stored. The basic stored data structure was changed from an ASCII text file structure in a full relational database. With a database structure it was now possible to add many associated tools such as a range of filtering and editing tools. New geophysical features added included source conductivity depth imaging, 1D TEM inversion, Euler deconvolution, FFT tools for magnetic and gravity data, 3D resistivity inversion and magnetization vector inversion.

=== EMIGMA 8 ===
Full compatibility with Windows Vista was added to EMIGMA with the April 2008 release of version 8. Support was added for new data collection instruments. Other new features include the freespace eikplate simulation algorithm, inversion tools for MT and CSAMT and more efficient inversion algorithms.

=== EMIGMA 9 ===
October 2015 was the release date of EMIGMA 9. A new Fortran compiler was used to rebuild the algorithm code for numerical algorithms such as 3D magnetic and gravity inversion, data interpolation and freespace plate simulation, increasing the scale of problems that could be processed and increasing speed by 5 times. New features were also added to the 1D TEM inversion tool and IP modeling.
