= GeoBase =

GeoBase may refer to:

- GeoBase (geospatial data), a federal, provincial, and territorial government initiative that provides quality geospatial data for all of Canada
- GEOBASE, bibliographic database for the Earth sciences, ecology, geomechanics, human geography, and oceanography
- SGS-Geobase (drilling data logger), free and open source software for geological data handling
