= Maptek =

Maptek Pty Ltd
- Company type: Private
- Founded: Sydney, Australia (1981 K. Robert Johnson & Associates)
- Headquarters: Adelaide, Australia
- Key people: Dr Bob Johnson (Retired), Peter Johnson (CEO)
- Products: 3D geological modelling & mine planning software; mine design and scheduling software; 3D laser imaging hardware & software; mine production information monitoring; fleet management
- Website: www.maptek.com

Maptek is a technology company based in Adelaide, Australia that develops 3D modelling, spatial analysis, and design technology software. The company was founded by Bob Johnson in 1981. It operated under the name K. Robert Johnson and Associates for 10 years before changing its name to Maptek in 1992.

Bob Johnson graduated in 1969 from the UNSW Sydney as a geologist, and completed his doctorate in 1972. Since 1976, he has pursued a commercial career using computers for mining. Johnson is a Fellow of the Australasian Institute of Mining and Metallurgy, and a member of the American Society of Mining Engineers.

== Technology ==
Vulcan is a general mine planning software package that provides 3D modular software visualisation for geological modelling and mine planning. It is used by mining engineers, geologists and mine surveyors. Applications include 3D geological mapping and modelling, mine design, mine planning, geotechnical analysis, mine scheduling and optimisation, and mine rehabilitation. The first generation of Vulcan was released in 1984 under a Fortran platform.

PointStudio (formerly I-Site Studio) is a laser scanning technology used for surveying large geographical areas and geotechnical analysis over highwalls. In February 2009, Leica Geosystems’ Spatial Solutions Division selected Maptek to supply laser scanners and software to be sold under the Leica Geosystems brand. Different versions of studio software were released from 2000 to 2018.

MineSuite is a fleet management, production, and reporting package, developed to be a tool for the mining industry. MineSuite collects and reports data from real-time monitoring of production systems and equipment in open pit and underground mines, processing, and production plants. It was released in 2001.

BlastLogic provides a centralised record of all operational blast data.

Eureka is a platform for viewing and analysing exploration project data. It displays aerial photography, terrain maps, historical plans and GIS data.

PerfectDig displays enhanced photographs of the mine environment coloured with 3D design conformance information. In 2015, PerfectDig won the South Australian Industrial & Resources, Australian Information Industry Association iAward. It was released in 2013.

Sentry is a surface change detection system. The system combines I-Site laser scan data with other software to track and analyse movement over time.

Evolution is a scheduling technology. It was released in 2015.

== Locations ==
Maptek has 5 offices in Australia – Adelaide, Brisbane, Newcastle, Perth and Sydney – and international distributors in Belo Horizonte (Brazil), Distrito Federal (Mexico), Hermosillo (Mexico), Denver (USA), Vancouver and Montreal (Canada), Edinburgh (UK), Johannesburg (RSA), Lima (Peru) and Viña del Mar (Chile).
