= SGS Genesis =

- Original author: Gamma Geostat International Inc.
- Developer: SGS S.A.
- Release: 1981
- Stable release: 2.1.14 / October 20, 2023
- Operating system: MS Windows
- Available in: C, C++
- License: Proprietary
- Website: www.geostat.com/genesis

SGS Genesis (previously SectCAD, BlkCAD, PolyCAD, Geostat) is involved in software development for the modelling of mineral resources. Indeed, in 1981, SGS S.A., formerly Gamma Geostat International Inc. was among the pioneers in computer based geostatistical methods and had created one of the first geological modeling software for the first generation of supercomputers (CDC Cyber mainframe). This software is used by SGS Canada Inc., among other things, for the production of National Instrument 43-101 reports in requirement with the Canadian securities regulation. Genesis offers all the tools necessary so that mineral resources are estimated in accordance with the rules of art in conformity with generally accepted CIM Estimation of Mineral Resource and Mineral Reserve Best Practices Guidelines.

The first programs were developed by one of the company founders, Michel David, Professor of Geostatistics at École Polytechnique of Montréal and Fellow of the Academy of Science of the Royal Society of Canada. He has established the first regular courses for future mining engineers and geologists in the Americas.

== See also ==
- Geologic modelling
- Geostatistics
- Mineral resource estimation
- Mineral resource classification
- Mineral exploration
- Exploration logging
- Well logging
- Economic geology
- National Instrument 43-101
