= GSI3D =

GSI3D software interface

GSI3D (Geological Surveying and Investigation in 3 dimensions) is a methodology and associated software tool for 3D geologic modeling developed by Hans-Georg Sobisch (INSIGHT Geologische Softwaresysteme, Germany) over the last 20 years initially in collaboration with the Geological Survey of Lower Saxony (LBEG) and the Oldenburg-Ostfriesland Waterboard (OOWV) in Germany and from 2006–2010 in collaboration with the British Geological Survey. GSI3D has been further developed and is now solely available as INSIGHT's SubsurfaceViewer MX. The software is written in Java and data is stored in extensible mark-up language XML.

== A brief outline of the methodology ==
GSI3D utilises a digital elevation model, surface geological linework and downhole borehole and geophysical data to enable the geologist to construct cross sections by correlating boreholes and the outcrops to produce a geological fence diagram. Mathematical interpolation between the nodes along the drawn sections and the limits of the units produces a solid model comprising a stack of triangulated objects each corresponding to one of the geological units present. Scientists draw their sections based on facts such as borehole logs correlated by intuition – the shape 'looks right' to a geologist. This 'looks right' element pulls on the geologists' wealth of understanding of earth processes, examination of exposures and theoretical knowledge gathered over a career in geology. GSI3D enables the efficient capture of tacit and implicit knowledge which was until now trapped in geologist's heads.

== GSI3D Research Consortium ==
Between April 2010 and April 2015, The British Geological Survey operated the 5-year GSI3D Research Consortium under license from INSIGHT GmbH. This not-for-profit consortium provided subscription-based access to a BGS-customized version of GSI3D along with a website and support package as a platform to develop a geological modelling community based around the cross-section methodology. The consortium successfully brought together Geological Surveys, commercial companies and academics from around the globe.
