= Golden Software =

Golden Software LLC
- Type: Private company
- Industry: Scientific Software
- Founded: 1983
- Headquarters: PO Box 281, Golden, Colorado, USA 80401
- Key people: Zach Mills, CEO Patrick Madison, Founder Dan Smith, Founder
- Website: www.goldensoftware.com

Golden Software LLC is a privately held, American company based in Golden, Colorado. It develops and markets a small catalog of GIS and scientific software.

Founded in 1983, Golden Software was the first to market three-dimensional surface and contour mapping applications for the PC.

== History ==
Patrick Madison, a CSM computer science instructor, and Dan Smith, a graduate student, began a partnership in 1983 with the development of a printer interface language that took advantage of the full resolution available to dot-matrix printers.

Their first commercial program, PlotCall, transformed plotter instructions into dot-matrix instructions compatible with over 20 commercial printers. This opened the computer graphing and mapping market to the wider arena of users with inexpensive commercial printers.

Between 1985 and 1986 the company released two DOS applications: Surfer, a surface and contour mapping program, and Grapher, a spreadsheet-plotting application.

In 1990 it released its first Windows program: MapViewer. Their next product, Didger was released in 1996.

Strater, a subsurface log and cross section plotting application, and Voxler, a 3D well and volumetric data visualization application, began shipping in 2004 and 2006 respectively.

In October 2014, General Manager Blakelee Mills became CEO of Golden Software. Patrick Madison remained the company's President, and Dan Smith remained the lead developer.

Golden Software released its newest product, Raster Tools in April 2016. Raster Tools is an add-in for Esri's ArcMap that creates raster data sets from XYZ data.
