= GEOVIA =

- Developer(s): Dassault Systèmes
- Operating system: Windows
- Type: PLM
- License: Proprietary software
- Website: www.3ds.com/products-services/geovia/

Dassault Systèmes GEOVIA is a set of geologic modeling and mining engineering software applications developed by the French engineering software company Dassault Systèmes. Formerly known as Gemcom, the company was founded in 1985 as a spin-off from by mining consultants SRK Consulting, with headquarters in Vancouver, British Columbia, Canada.

The name GEOVIA is derived from an acronym that reflects the software's focus and capabilities: GEO (relating to the Earth), V (Virtual), I (Interactive), and A (Application).
