= GeoModeller =

Software tool for 3D geologic modelling

- Developer(s): Intrepid Geophysics, Bureau de Recherches Géologiques et Minières
- Stable release: 4.0.5 / January 10, 2019; 6 years ago
- Operating system: MS Windows, Linux
- Available in: C, C++, Java
- License: Proprietary
- Website: www.geomodeller.com

GeoModeller (old names include 3DWEG, Geomodeller3D) is a methodology and associated software tool for 3D geologic modelling developed by Bureau de Recherches Géologiques et Minières and Intrepid Geophysics over the last 20 years. The software is written using Open CASCADE in C++ for the engine (geometry, topology, viewers, data management, ...), Java for the GUI and data are stored in extensible mark-up language XML. GeoModeller has started to revolutionise the working practices, data standards and products of a geological survey as a whole. The software takes into account all structural geology data such as dip, dip directions, strike, hingelines and axialtrace to build the geometry of geological units.

== Methodology ==
GeoModeller utilizes a Digital Terrain Model, surface geological linework, cross-sections, geophysical interpretation and drillhole borehole data to enable the geologist to construct cross sections, or 3D models. 3D Geostatistical interpolation (co-kriging) using all the data (location of interface, dip, direction, ...) produces a 3D implicit function representing a solid model. The model build may take in account if necessary a network of geologic faults. The model could be represented by triangulated objects each corresponding to one of the geological units present. Geologists can draw the model in their sections to obtain a fence diagram. The geologist can use their knowledge to add information in the 3D space until he obtain a 'right' model.

== Inversion of the 3D model ==
In geological and mining or oil exploration applications, seismic profiles as well as gravity and magnetic data are often available. Interpreted seismic cross-sections directly provide data that can be processed directly as geometric constraints for 3D modelling. On the other hand, gravity and magnetic data provide indirect constraints. Presently, a 3D geological model is considered as the initial state of a constrained inverse modelling of this data. That inversion is based on an iterative method, which is applied to a discrete version of the domain under study. This inversion formulation allows separate inversion of either gravity or magnetic data or simultaneous inversion of both datasets and tensor components of gravity and magnetic field . The final result is a probabilistic 3D geological model.
