= Move (software) =

MOVE
- Developer(s): Petroleum Experts Limited
- Stable release: 2019.1.1
- Operating system: Windows, macOS
- Type: Geological modelling
- Website: www.petex.com/products/move-suite

MOVE is a geologic modelling software released in September 2008. It provides a full digital environment for best practice structural modelling to reduce risk and uncertainty in geological models. The MOVE suite also provides a platform for integrating and interpreting data, cross-section construction, 3D model building, kinematic restoration and validation, geomechanical modelling, fracture modelling, fault response modelling, and fault and stress analysis.

MOVE 2019.1 was released on 8 November 2019 and includes substantial new features, as well as improvements to the existing functionality and usability.

The software suite consists of the following modules:

· MOVE core

· 2D Kinematic Modelling

· 3D Kinematic Modelling

· Geomechanical Modelling

· Fracture Modelling

· Stress Analysis

· Fault Analysis

· Fault Response Modelling

· Sediment Modelling

· MOVELink

Petroleum Experts have also developed two free field mapping apps for both tablets and phones; FieldMOVE (Android, iOS and Windows tablets) and FieldMOVE Clino (Android and iOS phones)
