= XVT =

XVT eXtensible Virtual Toolkit
- Developer(s): Providence Software Solutions, Inc.
- Stable release: 14.0 / September 29, 2016
- Operating system: Cross-platform
- Type: Development Library
- License: Proprietary
- Website: www.xvt.com

XVT is a software development environment for building cross-platform GUI applications in C or C++. XVT allows developers to graphically lay out an application's GUI, and provides cross-platform libraries to aid development.

XVT has been in development since 1989 and has provided a cross-platform software development toolkit for the majority of that time.

Their approach is not as a widget replacement look-alike set, but acts more like a universal API translator. XVT is an "abstraction layer" that removes the developer from being concerned with which OS the application will run on. When the application is compiled, the XVT API points to the native controls/widgets for the OS on which the code is being compiled. It also allows applications to adapt to whatever user themes the OS allows users to set.

There are other uses of this product beyond cross platform development. As a CASE tool, a non-programmer business analyst can lay out the user interfaces, review them with end users and subject matter experts in a RAD-like (Rapid Application Development) requirements capture by functional review, and then the XVT architect tool will deliver the C or C++ (ANSI-compliant) code.

The developers have announced support for GTK+ on Linux and Cocoa on Mac, but these ports are not yet available. Because Microsoft no longer support the HLP help format, XVT applications require the user to install the Microsoft .hlp viewer.

XVT was originally developed by Advanced Programming Institute in Boulder Co., a company founded by former Bell Labs employee Marc Rochkind. The company changed its name to XVT when that product became the main company effort. The XVT product was purchased by Providence Software Solutions in 2001.

== Platforms ==
XVT currently supports:

- Windows
- Linux
- OS X
- Solaris
- HP-UX
- AIX

== Editions ==
=== XVT DSC ===
XVT DSC includes the PTK, or Portability ToolKit, and the XVT Design interface designer. It is designed for use with C.

=== XVT DSP ===
XVT DSP includes the PTK, Power++ library (C++ bindings to the PTK), and the XVT Architect interface designer. It is designed for use with C++.

=== XVT Net ===
XVT Net allows applications built using either of the other editions to be recompiled as a networked application. The application may then be run on a server which thin clients can connect to in order to use the application.
