= Geosoft =

Canadian software company

Geosoft Incorporated
- Company type: Private
- Industry: Exploration & Software
- Founded: 1986
- Fate: Acquired by Seequent
- Headquarters: Toronto, Ontario, Canada
- Area served: Worldwide
- Revenue: ▲23 million CAD (2011)
- Website: geosoft.com

Geosoft Incorporated is a software development and services company headquartered in Toronto, Canada. The company provides geophysical and geological software and geospatial server technology for professional geoscientists involved in natural resource exploration and related earth science disciplines.

== History ==
Geosoft was founded in Toronto in 1982 as a partnership between Ian MacLeod and Colin Reeves to develop geophysical software for geophysical exploration and geotechnical engineering applications. The interests of the partnership and the trademark "Geosoft" were purchased by Paterson, Grant and Watson Ltd. in 1984, who continued to develop Geosoft branded software for geophysical applications.

The software interests of Paterson, Grant and Watson were spun off to form Geosoft Incorporated on February 1, 1986.

In July, 2007, Geosoft acquired the software rights to the potential-field modelling program GM-SYS from Corvallis, Oregon company Northwest Geophysical Associates . As part of the acquisition the research company Geosoft (USA) Research Inc. was established in Corvallis, Oregon to employ the GM-SYS development team and continue development of GM-SYS and related technologies.

In December 2018, Geosoft was acquired by Seequent

== Products ==
Geosoft develops software products which operate on desktop, server and internet cloud platforms. The following are the primary product brands owned and developed by Geosoft:

=== Mapping Software ===
Oasis montaj is a spatial information processing and mapping software platform for exploration geophysics and geological modelling applied to resource exploration. The system is extended by users to meet specific exploration requirements using the GX Developer

Geosoft's Target is used in mineral exploration to manage, view and model exploration drilling information as part of defining economic mineral deposits for mining.

=== ArcGIS Extension Software ===
Target for ArcGIS is an ArcGIS extension that processes exploration drilling data and generates maps for presentation, adding exploration spatial data compilation, mapping and analysis of geospatial data capability to the GIS environment.

Geochemistry for ArcGIS is an ArcGIS extension that enables geoscientists to import, validate and analyze surface or drillhole geochemical data within the ArcGIS environment.

=== 3D Modelling Technology ===
GM-SYS is geological modelling software for gravity and magnetic geophysical data.

VOXI Earth Modelling is a cloud computing software service that generates 3-D voxel physical property models from gravity and magnetic geophysical data.

=== Unexploded Ordnance Detection Software ===
UX-Detect is an Oasis montaj module that processes and analyzes unexploded ordnance (UXO) data.

=== Server Technology ===
Geosoft's DAP server is enterprise software that provides services to catalogue, manage, deliver and visualize large spatial exploration data sets. It is considered middleware technology, designed to deal with spatial data security, stability, retrieval and reliability across an organization.

== Organization ==
Geosoft Incorporated's international subsidiaries include:

Geosoft Europe Ltd., Wallingford, UK
Geosoft Latinoamerica Ltda., Rio de Janeiro, Brazil
Geosoft Australia Pty., Perth, Australia
Geosoft Africa Ltd., Pretoria, South Africa
Geosoft (USA) Research Inc., Corvallis, USA.

== Recognition ==
- 2012 Ranked 131 in the Branham300 Top 250 Canadian ICT Companies
- 2010 Esri International Partner of the Year award
- 2009 Ranked #6 best place to work in Canada by the Great Place to Work Institute
- 2007 Esri International Partner of the Year award

== See also ==
- Expanding the Boundaries, Earth Explorer, August 2008, pages 24–27.
