= BGS Groundhog Desktop =

Free geomodelling software

- Original author(s): British Geological Survey
- Developer(s): British Geological Survey
- Stable release: 2.0.0 / January 27, 2020; 5 years ago
- Operating system: MS Windows
- Available in: Java
- License: Open Government Licence
- Website: www.bgs.ac.uk/groundhog/

BGS Groundhog Desktop is a software tool developed and made available by the British Geological Survey and used for geological data visualisation, interpretation and 3D geologic modelling. It is available in both free-to-use and commercial editions. Groundhog Desktop is a key part of the BGS's work to develop 3D models of the UK subsurface.

It is widely used by other Geological Survey Organisations including at the Geological Survey of Sweden, Geological Survey of Finland and with environmental consultancies.

== Features ==
- Digitise and interpret geologic cross section
- Correlate borehole logs
- Display and edit borehole data
- Import AGS borehole data
- Display and edit geological map linework
- Import georeferenced imagery
- Import digital elevation model
- Develop conceptual site models (CSM)
- Develop 3D geological models

== 3D Geological Modelling ==
BGS Groundhog Desktop uses an implicit modelling algorithm based on a diverse set of inputs. An interpolation algorithm processes the inputs and generates each geological layer according to geological rules in order to create a vertically consistent stack. The resulting model is visualised as a block model.

== Example projects ==
- A geological model of London and the Thames Valley, southeast England
- Modelling rapid coastal catch-up after defence removal along the soft cliff coast of Happisburgh, UK
- Enkoping Esker Pilot Study : workflow for data integration and publishing of 3D geological outputs
- UK Minecraft Geology Model built using Groundhog
- 3D Geological Model of the completed Farringdon underground railway
