= Geologist =

Scientist who studies geology

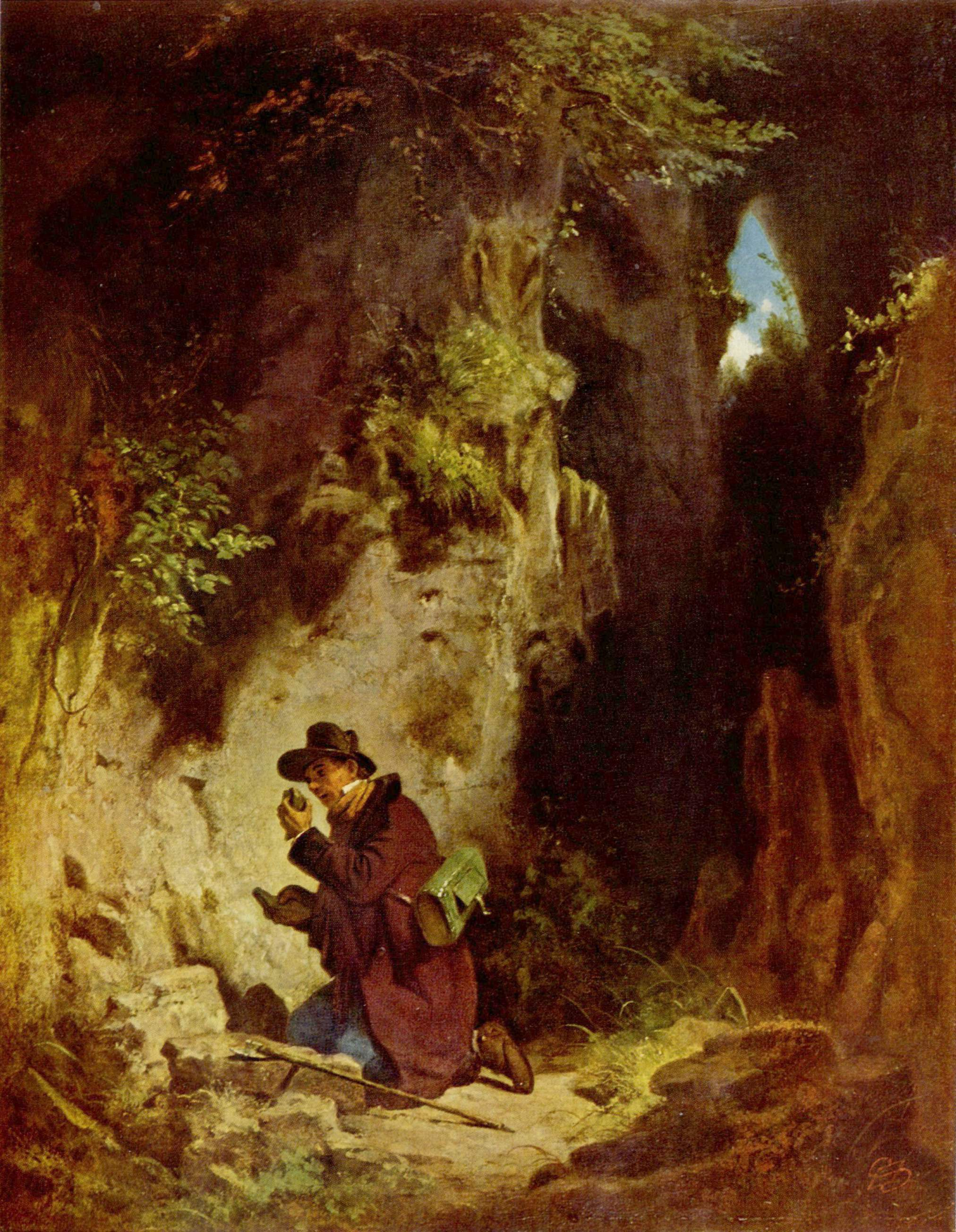
- The Geologist by Carl Spitzweg, c. 1860

Occupation
- Names: Geologist
- Occupation type: Profession
- Activity sectors: Government; Mining; Petroleum industry Engineering

Description
- Related jobs: Seismologist; Volcanologist; Geophysicist; Geoscientists

A geologist is a scientist who studies the structure, composition, and history of Earth. Geologists incorporate techniques from physics, chemistry, biology, mathematics, and geography to perform research in the field and the laboratory. Geologists work in the energy and mining sectors to exploit natural resources. They monitor environmental hazards such as earthquakes, volcanoes, tsunamis and landslides. Geologists are also important contributors to climate change discussions.

== History ==
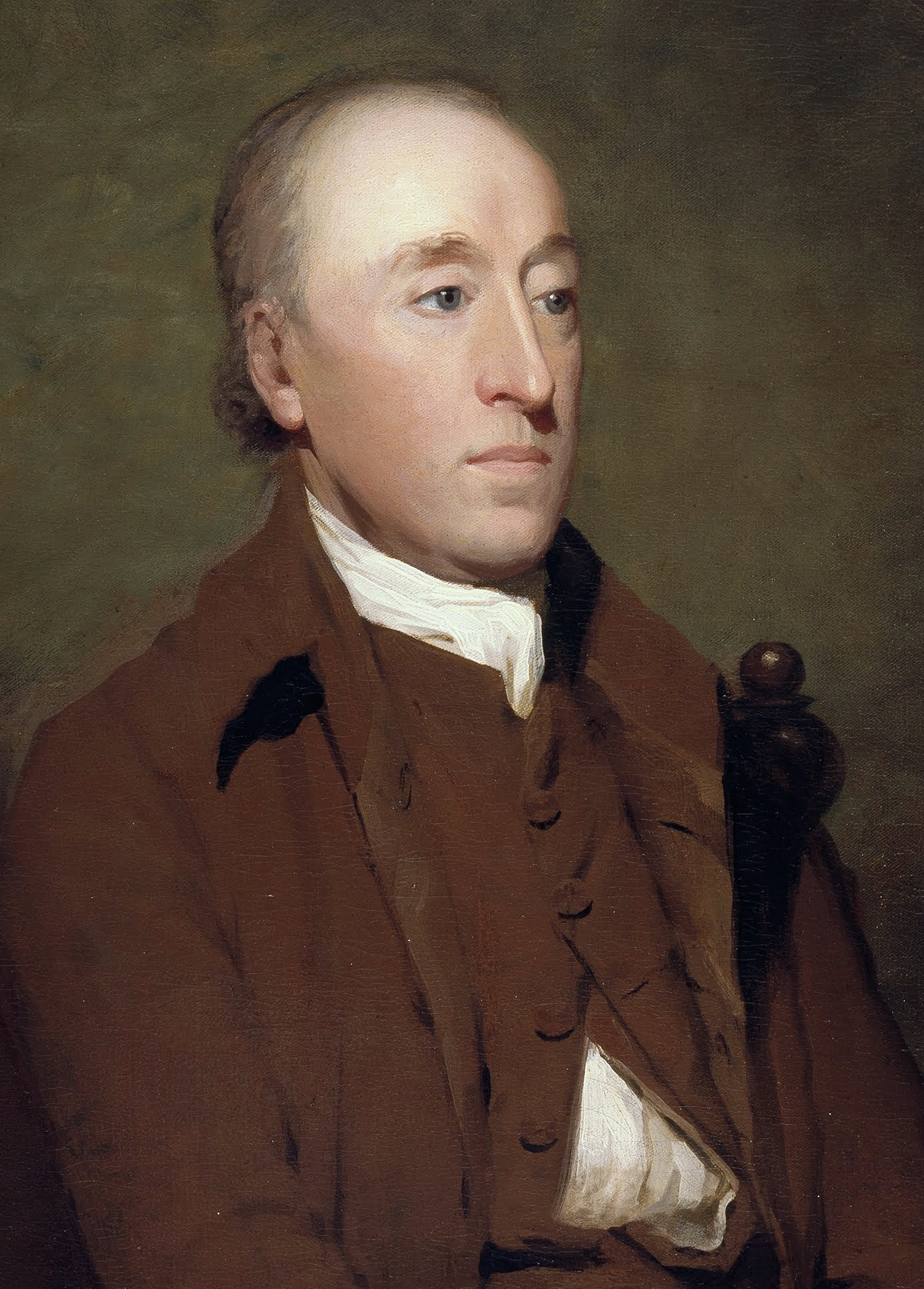
Scotsman James Hutton, father of modern geology

James Hutton is often viewed as the first modern geologist. In 1785 he showed a paper titled Theory of the Earth to the Royal Society of Edinburgh. In his paper, he explained his theory that the Earth must be much older than had previously been supposed to allow enough time for mountains to be eroded and for sediments to form new rocks at the bottom of the sea, which in turn were raised up to become dry land. Hutton published a two-volume version of his ideas in 1795 (Vol. 1, Vol. 2). Followers of Hutton were known as Plutonists because they believed that some rocks were formed by vulcanism, which is the deposition of lava from volcanoes, as opposed to the Neptunists, led by Abraham Werner, who believed that all rocks had settled out of a large ocean whose level gradually dropped over time.

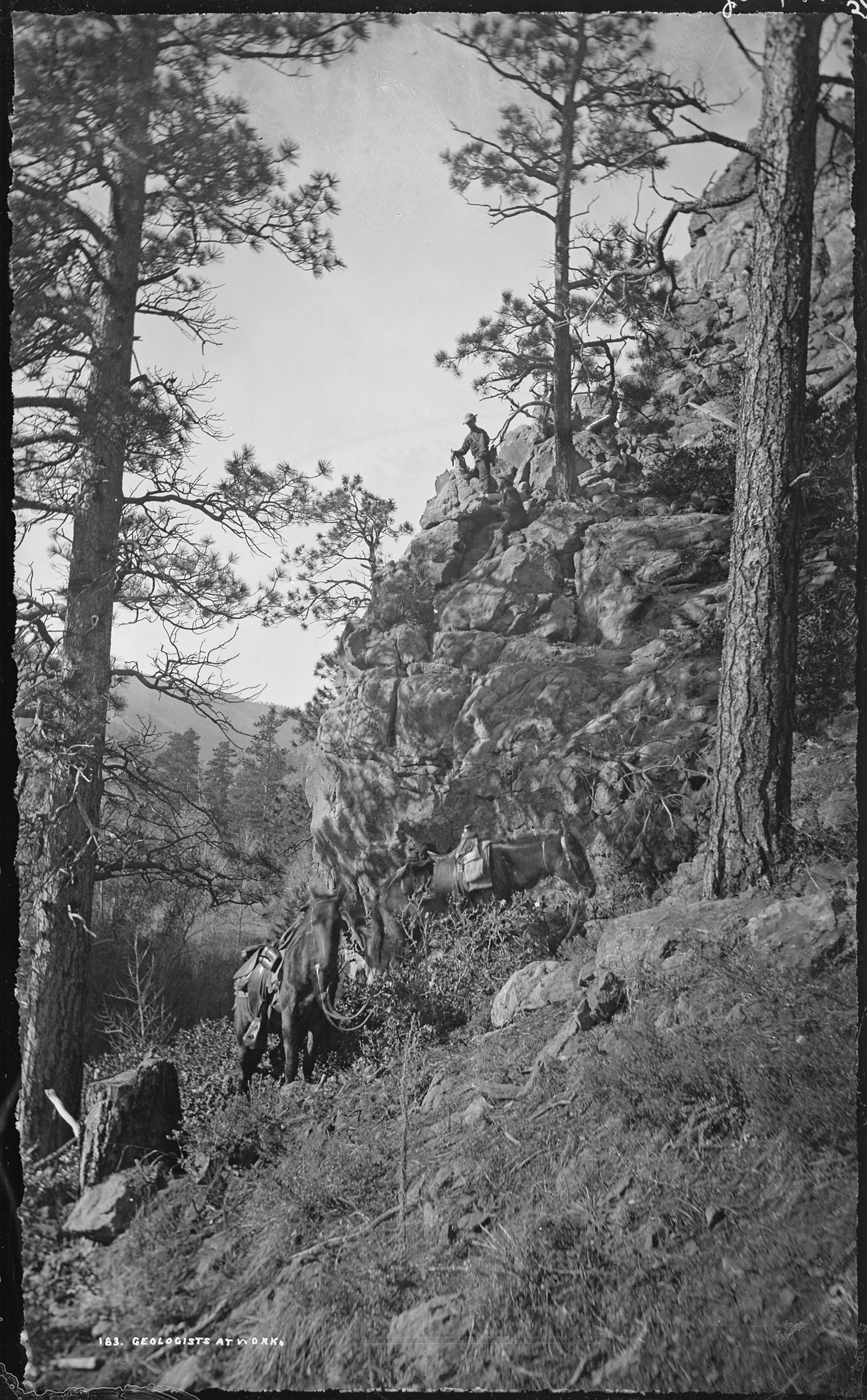
"Geologists at work" from the U.S. Geological and Geographic Survey of the Territories (1874 - 06/30/1879). Photographer: William Henry Jackson

The first geological map of the United States was produced in 1809 by William Maclure. In 1807, Maclure commenced the self-imposed task of making a geological survey of the United States. Almost every state in the Union was traversed and mapped by him; the Allegheny Mountains being crossed and recrossed some 50 times. The results of his unaided labors were submitted to the American Philosophical Society in a memoir entitled Observations on the Geology of the United States explanatory of a Geological Map, and published in the Society's Transactions, together with the nation's first geological map. This antedates William Smith's geological map of England by six years, although it was constructed using a different classification of rocks.

Sir Charles Lyell first published his famous book, Principles of Geology, in 1830. This book, which influenced the thought of Charles Darwin, successfully promoted the doctrine of uniformitarianism. This theory states that slow geological processes have occurred throughout the Earth's history and are still occurring today. In contrast, catastrophism is the theory that Earth's features formed in single, catastrophic events and remained unchanged thereafter. Though Hutton believed in uniformitarianism, the idea was not widely accepted at the time.

== Education ==
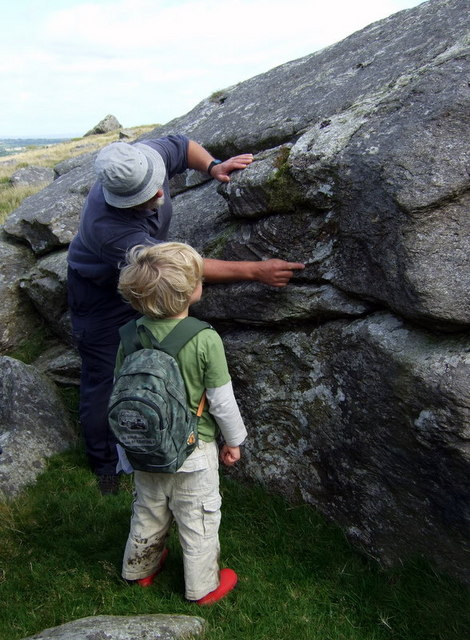
A young geologist learns about flow banding

For an aspiring geologist, training typically includes significant coursework in physics, mathematics, and chemistry, in addition to classes offered through the geology department; historical and physical geology, igneous and metamorphic petrology and petrography, hydrogeology, sedimentology, stratigraphy, mineralogy, palaeontology, physical geography and structural geology are among the many required areas of study. Most geologists also need skills in GIS and other mapping techniques. Geology students often spend portions of the year, especially the summer though sometimes during a January term, living and working under field conditions with faculty members (often referred to as "field camp"). Many non-geologists often take geology courses or have expertise in geology that they find valuable to their fields; this is common in the fields of geography, engineering, chemistry, urban planning, environmental studies, among others.

=== Specialization ===
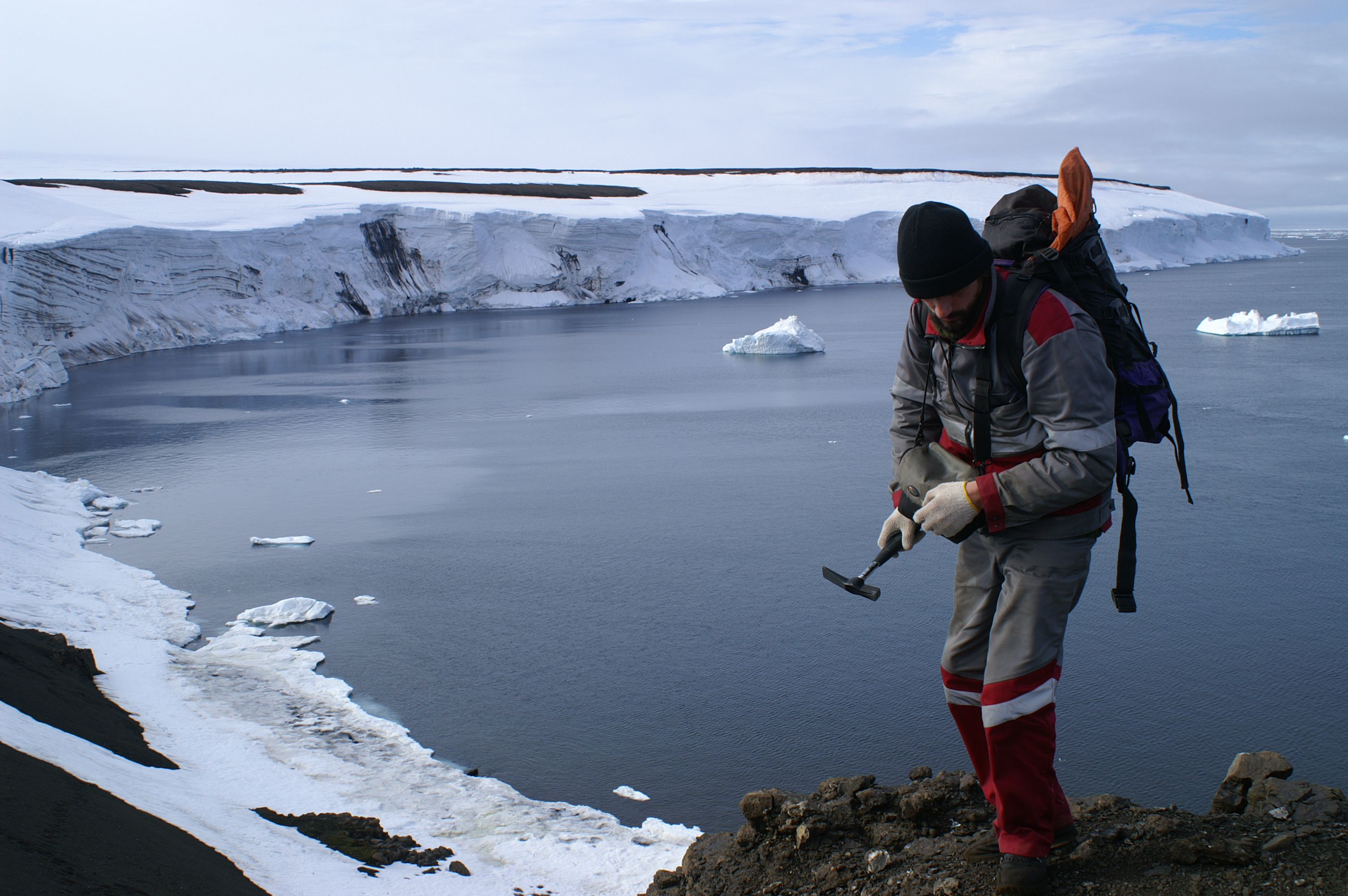
A geologist working in the Arctic

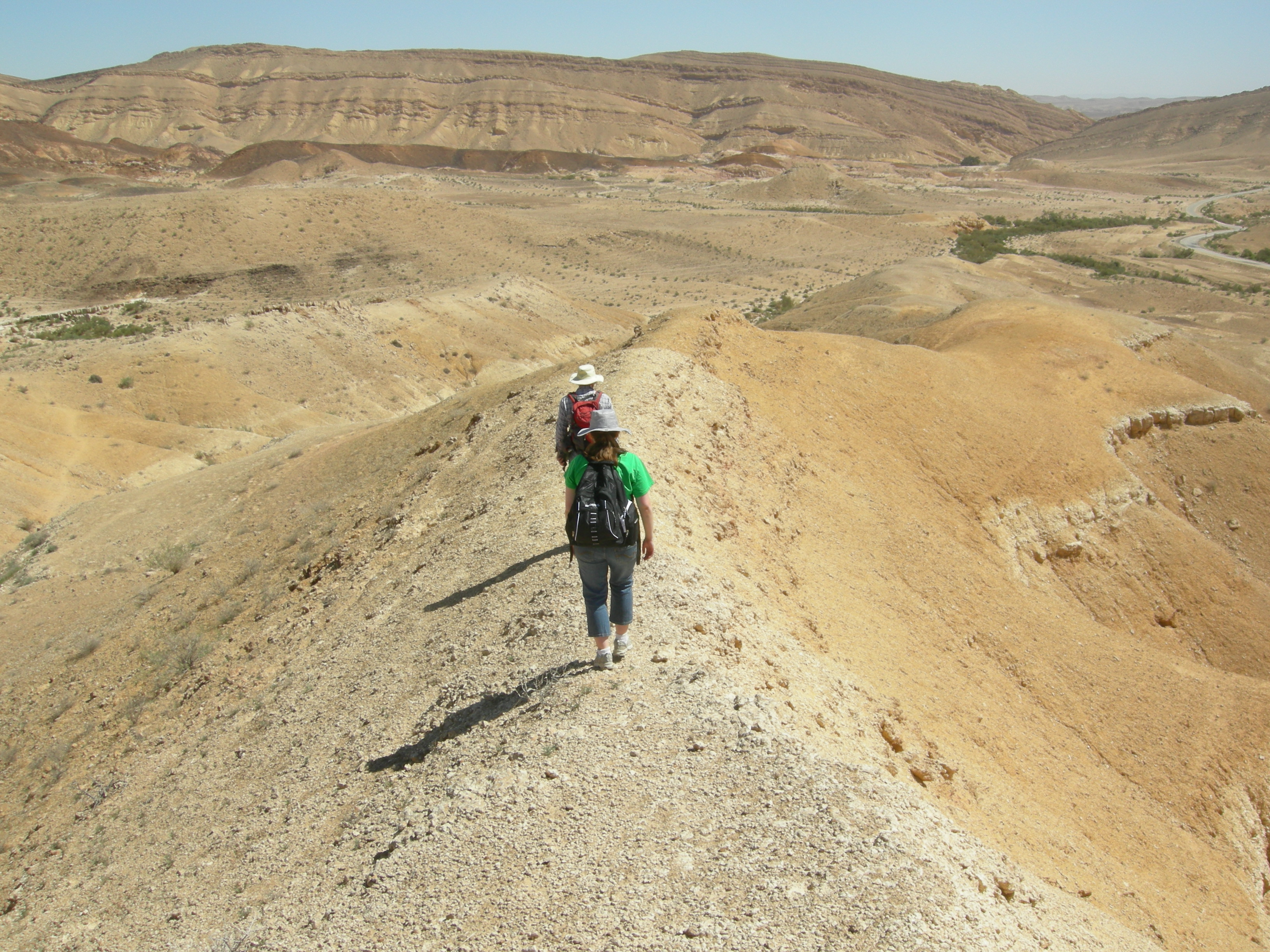
Geologists exploring Jurassic sedimentary rocks in Makhtesh Gadol, Negev Desert, Israel

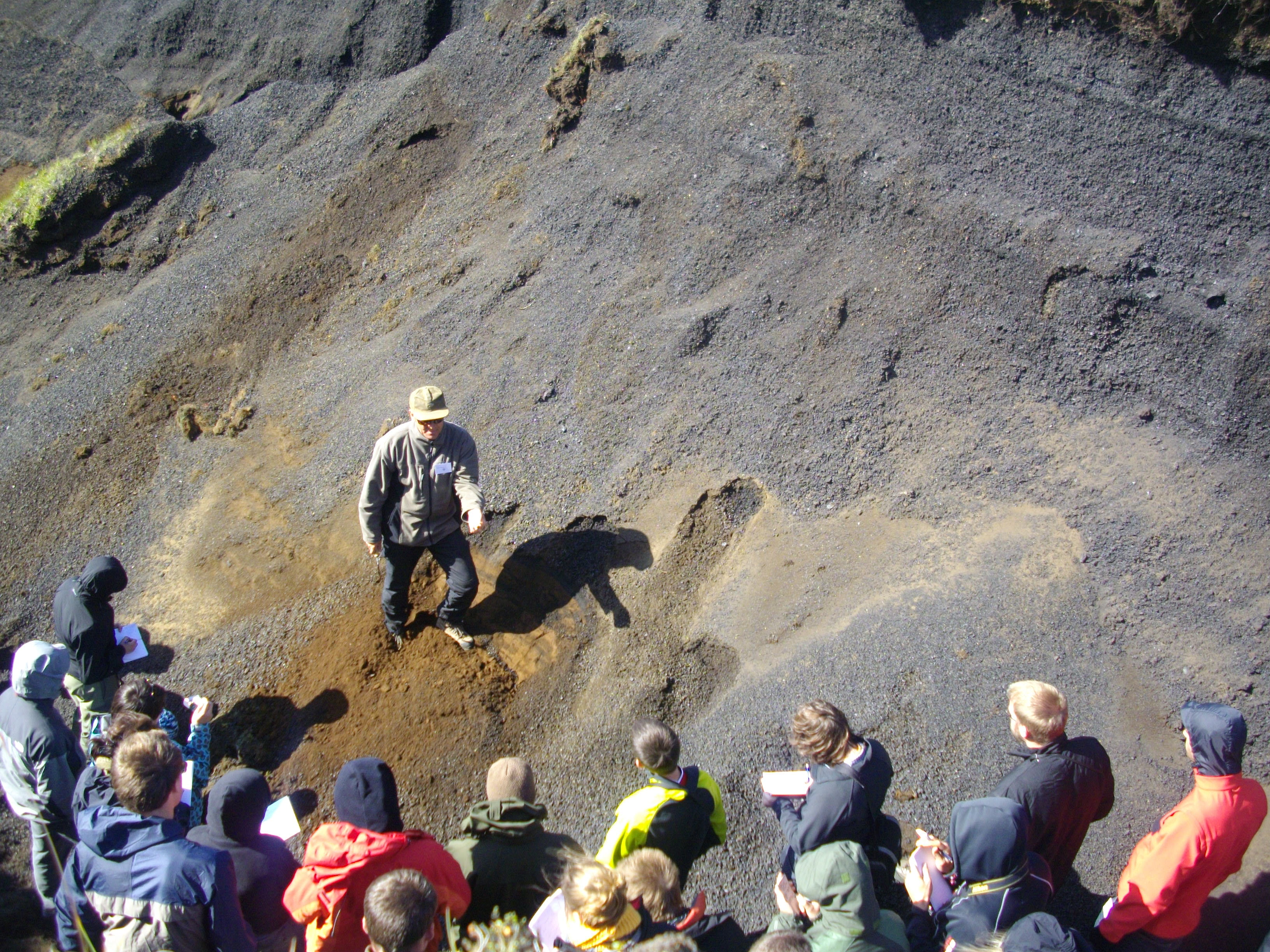
Geologist explaining the importance of volcanic ash layers to students on field in Iceland

Geologists, can be generally identified as a specialist in one or more of the various geoscience disciplines, such as a geophysicist or geochemist. Geologists may concentrate their studies or research in one or more of the following disciplines:

- Economic geology: the study of ore genesis, and the mechanisms of ore creation, geostatistics.
- Engineering geology: application of the geologic sciences to engineering practice for the purpose of assuring that the geologic factors affecting the location, design, construction, operation and maintenance of engineering works are recognized and adequately provided for;
- Geophysics: the applied branch deals with the application of physical methods such as gravity, seismicity, electricity, magnetic properties to study the earth.
- Geochemistry: the applied branch deals with the study of the chemical makeup and behaviour of rocks, and the study of the behaviour of their minerals.
- Geochronology: the study of isotope geology specifically toward determining the date within the past of rock formation, metamorphism, mineralization and geological events (notably, meteorite impacts).
- Geomorphology: the study of landforms and the processes that create them.
- Hydrogeology: the study of the origin, occurrence and movement of groundwater water in a subsurface geological system.
- Igneous petrology: the study of igneous processes such as igneous differentiation, fractional crystallization, intrusive and volcanological phenomena.
- Isotope geology: the case of the isotopic composition of rocks to determine the processes of rock and planetary formation.
- Metamorphic petrology: the study of the effects of metamorphism on minerals and rocks.
- Marine geology: the study of the seafloor; involves geophysical, geochemical, sedimentological and paleontological investigations of the ocean floor and coastal margins. Marine geology has strong ties to physical oceanography and plate tectonics.
- Mineralogy: the study of the chemistry, crystal structure, and physical (including optical) properties of minerals and mineralized artifacts. Specific studies within mineralogy include the processes of mineral origin and formation, classification of minerals, their geographical distribution, as well as their utilization.
- Palaeoclimatology: the application of geological science to determine the climatic conditions present in the Earth's atmosphere within the Earth's history.
- Palaeontology: the classification and taxonomy of fossils within the geological record and the construction of a palaeontological history of the Earth.
- Pedology: the study of soil, soil formation, and regolith formation.
- Petroleum geology: the study of sedimentary basins applied to the search for hydrocarbons (oil exploration).
- Planetary geology: the study of geosciences as it relates to other celestial bodies, namely planets and their moons. This includes the subdisciplines of lunar geology, selenology, and martian geology, areology.
- Sedimentology: the study of sedimentary rocks, strata, formations, eustasy and the processes of modern-day sedimentary and erosive systems.
- Seismology: the study of earthquakes.
- Structural geology: the study of folds, faults, foliation and rock microstructure to determine the deformational history of rocks and regions.
- Volcanology: the study of volcanoes, their eruptions, lavas, magma processes and hazards.

== Employment ==
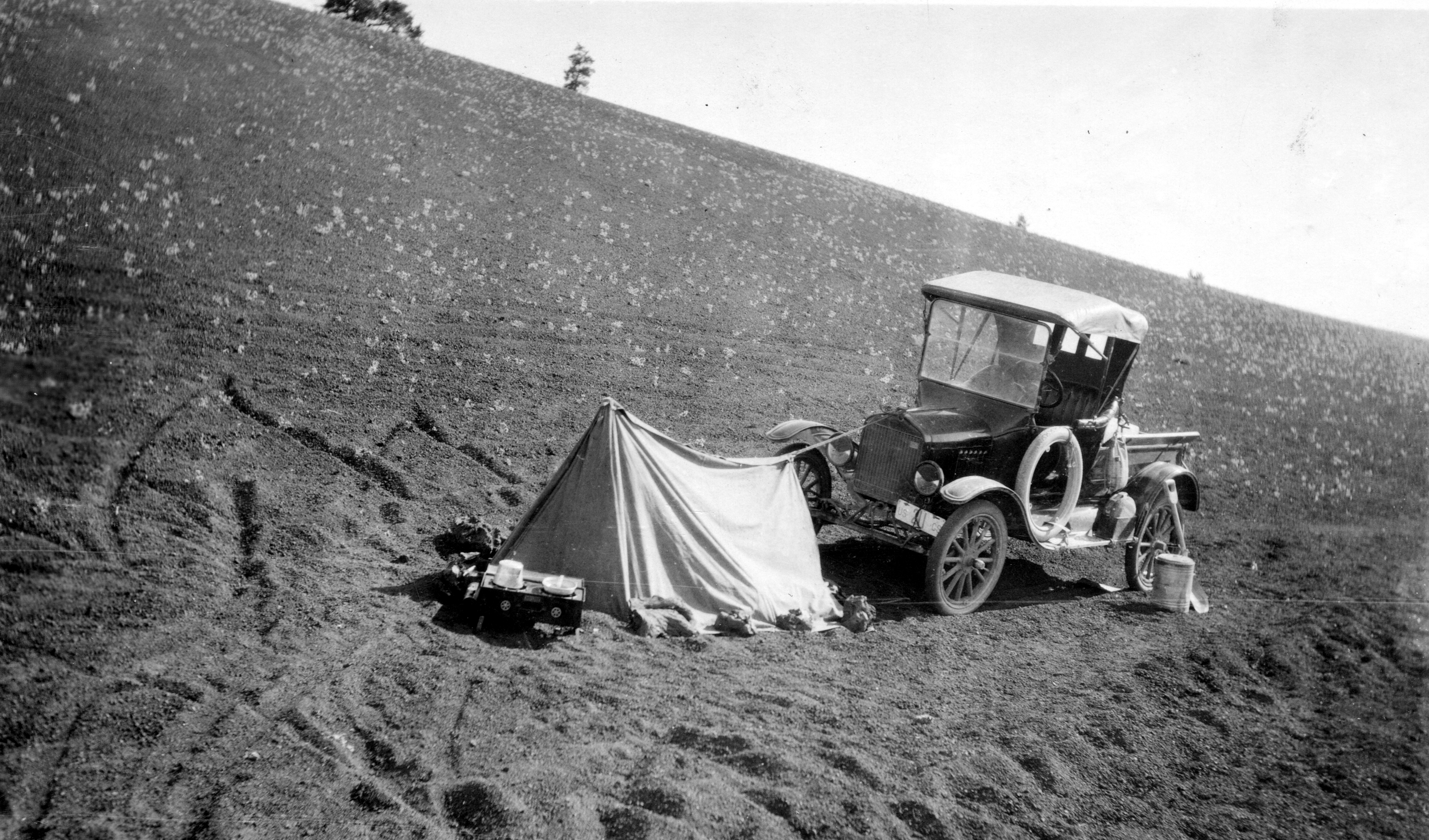
"Picturesque camp made by a lone geologist on the cinders of Inferno". This photo was taken during a U.S. Department of the Interior Geological Survey in 1921.

Professional geologists may work in the mining industry or in the associated area of mineral exploration. They may also work in oil and gas industry.

Some geologists also work for a wide range of government agencies, private firms, and non-profit and academic institutions. They are usually hired on a contract basis or hold permanent positions within private firms or official agencies (such as the Geological Survey and Mineral Exploration of Iran).

Local, state, and national governments hire geologists to work on geological projects that are of interest to the public community. The investigation of a country's natural resources is often a key role when working for government institutions; the work of the geologist in this field can be made publicly available to help the community make more informed decisions related to the exploitation of resources, management of the environment and the safety of critical infrastructure - all of which is expected to bring greater wellbeing to the country. This 'wellbeing' is often in the form of greater tax revenues from new or extended mining projects or through better infrastructure and/or natural disaster planning.

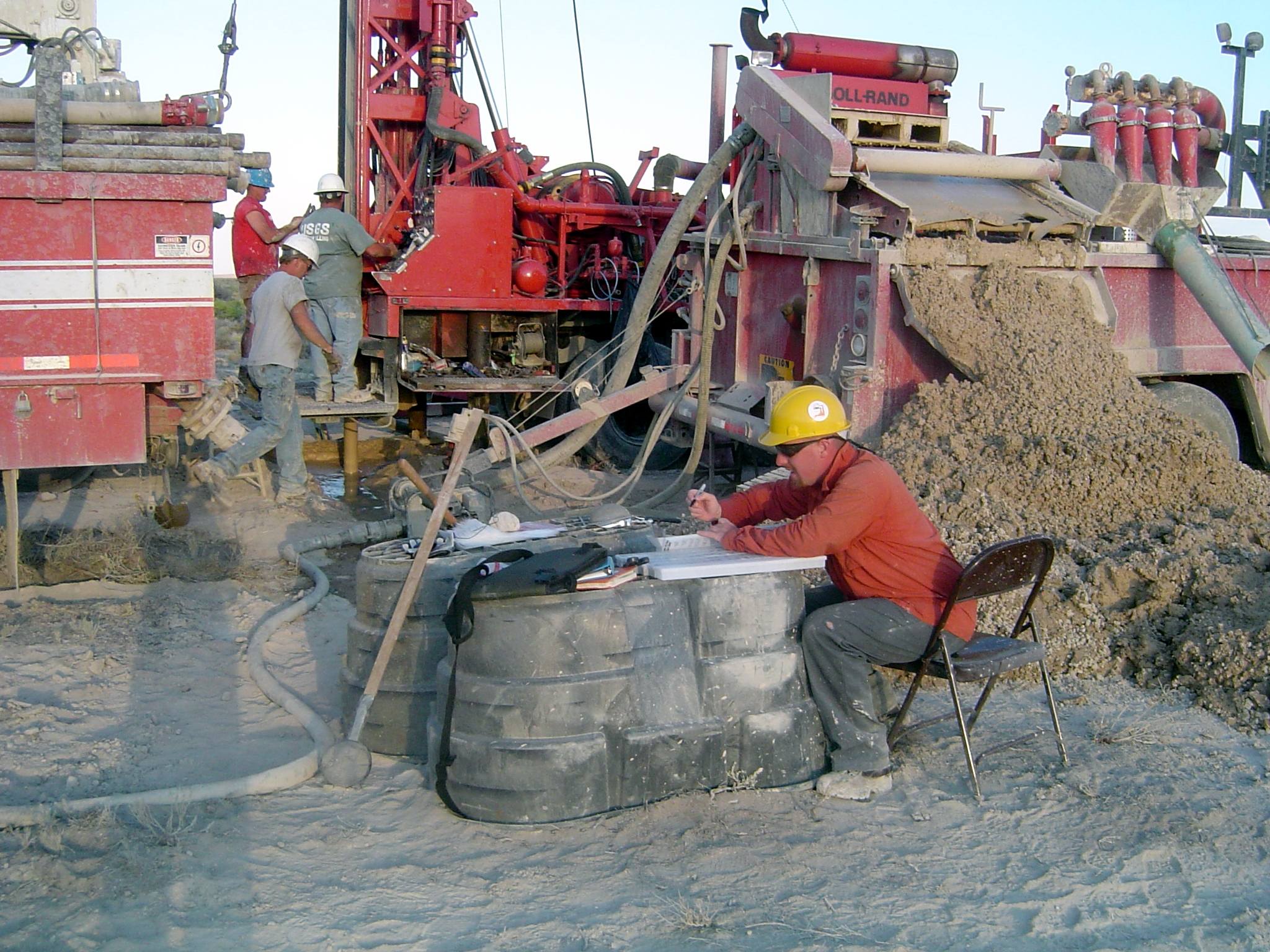
Geologist mud logging, common in petroleum and water-well drilling

An engineering geologist is employed to investigate geologic hazards and geologic constraints for the planning, design and construction of public and private engineering projects, forensic and post-mortem studies, and environmental impact analysis. Exploration geologists use all aspects of geology and geophysics to locate and study natural resources. In many countries or U.S. states without specialized environmental remediation licensure programs, the environmental remediation field is often dominated by professional geologists, particularly hydrogeologists, with professional concentrations in this aspect of the field. Petroleum and mining companies use mudloggers, and large-scale land developers use the skills of geologists and engineering geologists to help them locate oil and minerals, adapt to local features such as karst topography or earthquake risk, and comply with environmental regulations.

Geologists in academia usually hold an advanced degree in a specialized area within their geological discipline and are employed by universities.

== Professional designation ==
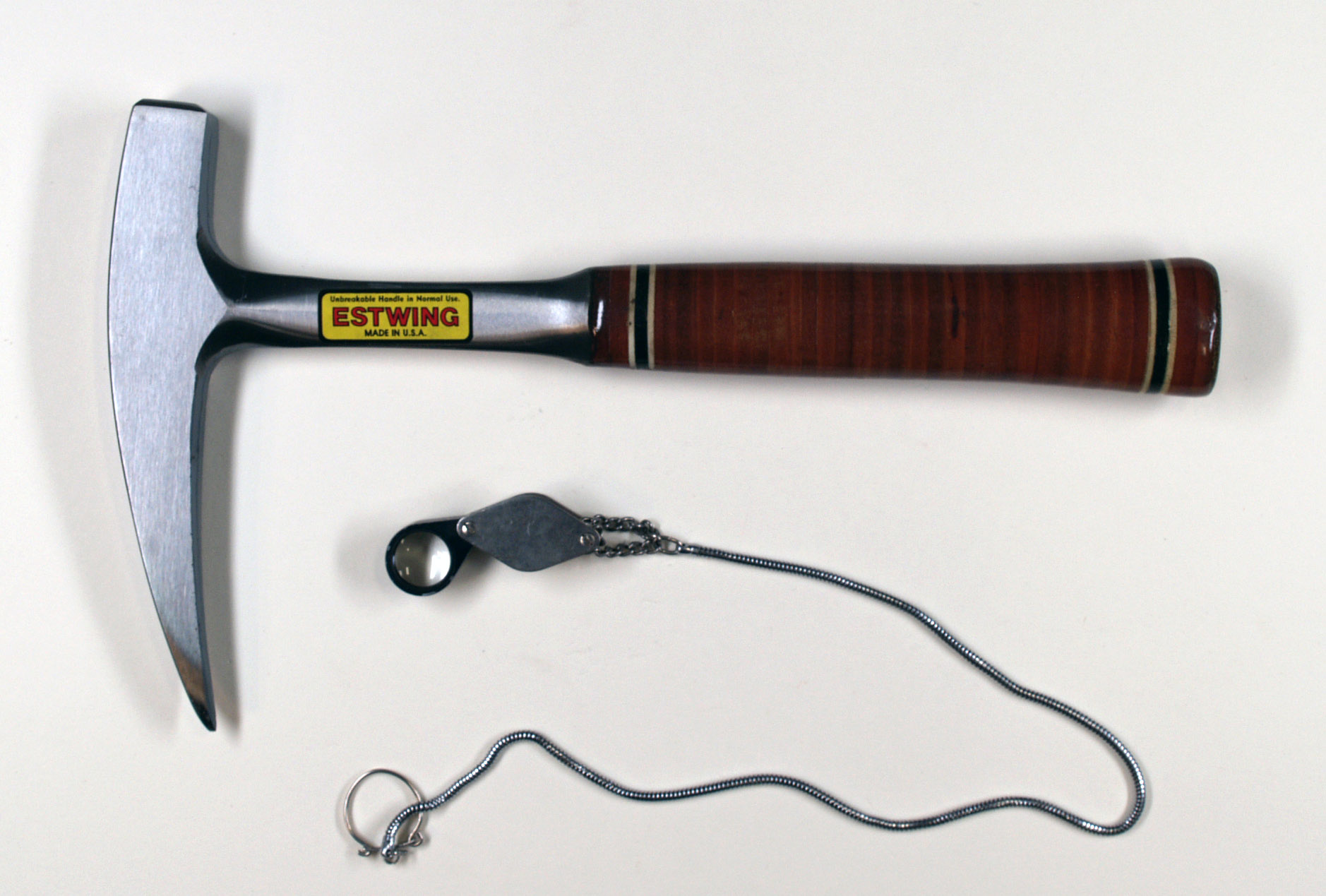
The rock hammer and hand lens (or loupe) are two of the most characteristic tools carried by geologists in the field.

In Canada, National Instrument 43-101 requires reports containing estimates of mineral resources and reserves to be prepared by, or under the supervision of, a Qualified Person (QP) who has at least five years of experience with the reported minerals and is a member of a professional association. The QP accepts personal liability for the professional quality of the report and underlying work.

The rules and guidelines codified in National Instrument 43-101 were introduced after a scandal in 1997 where Bre-X geologists salted drill core samples at a gold exploration property in Busang, Indonesia. The falsified drilling results misled Bre-X investors and upon discovery of the fraud, the company collapsed in the largest gold mining scam in history.

In Europe exists the professional title of EurGeol (European Geologist) awarded by the European Federation of Geologists.

== Professional Societies ==
Geologists may belong to a number of professional societies promoting research, networking, and professional development within the field.

- American Association of Petroleum Geologists (AAPG)
- American Geosciences Institute (AGI)
- American Geophysical Union (AGU)
- European Association of Geoscientists and Engineers (EAGE) – Professional organization for geoscientists and engineers
- European Federation of Geologists (EFG)
- European Geosciences Union (EGU) – International science society
- Geological Society of America (GSA)
- British Geological Survey (BGS)
- Geological Society of London (GSL)
- United States Geological Survey (USGS)
- International Commission on Stratigraphy (ICS)
- International Union of Geological Sciences (IUGS)
- Mineralogical Society of America (MSA)
- Society for Sedimentary Geology (SEPM)
- Society of Economic Geologists (SEG)

== See also ==
- List of geologists
- List of geology journals
- List of free geology software
- Petroleum geologist
