= Mining engineering =

Engineering discipline

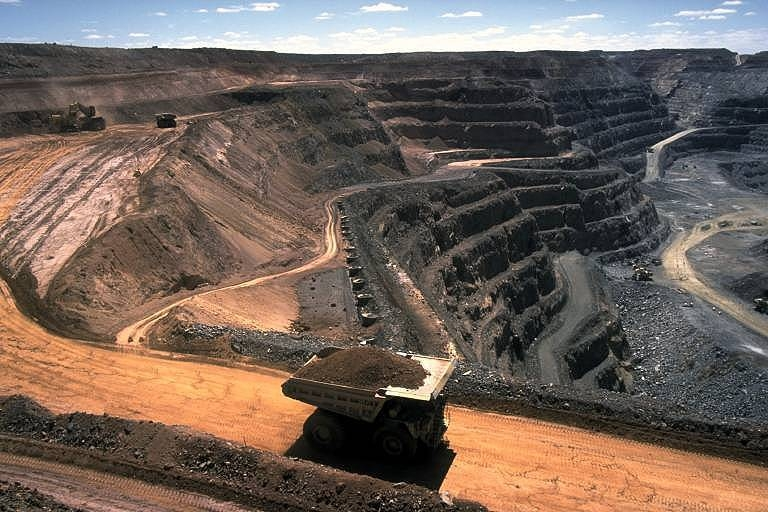
Surface gold mine with haul truck in foreground, in Kalgoorlie, Australia

Mining engineering is the extraction of minerals from the ground. It is associated with many other disciplines, such as mineral processing, exploration, excavation, geology, metallurgy, geotechnical engineering and surveying. A mining engineer may manage any phase of mining operations, from exploration and discovery of the mineral resources, through feasibility study, mine design, development of plans, production and operations to mine closure.

== History of mining engineering ==
From prehistoric times to the present, mining has played a significant role in the existence of the human race. Since the beginning of civilization, people have used stone and ceramics and, later, metals found on or close to the Earth's surface. These were used to manufacture early tools and weapons. For example, high-quality flint found in northern France and southern England were used to set fire and break rock. Flint mines have been found in chalk areas where seams of the stone were followed underground by shafts and galleries. The oldest known mine on the archaeological record is the "Lion Cave" in Eswatini. At this site, which radiocarbon dating indicates to be about 43,000 years old, paleolithic humans mined mineral hematite, which contained iron and was ground to produce the red pigment ochre.

The ancient Romans were innovators of mining engineering. They developed large-scale mining methods, such as the use of large volumes of water brought to the minehead by aqueducts for hydraulic mining. The exposed rock was then attacked by fire-setting, where fires were used to heat the rock, which would be quenched with a stream of water. The thermal shock cracked the rock, enabling it to be removed. In some mines, the Romans utilized water-powered machinery such as reverse overshot water-wheels. These were used extensively in the copper mines at Rio Tinto in Spain, where one sequence comprised 16 such wheels arranged in pairs, lifting water about 80 feet (24 m).

Black powder was first used in mining in Banská Štiavnica, Kingdom of Hungary (present-day Slovakia) in 1627. This allowed blasting of rock and earth to loosen and reveal ore veins, which was much faster than fire-setting. The Industrial Revolution saw further advances in mining technologies, including improved explosives and steam-powered pumps, lifts, and drills.

== Education ==
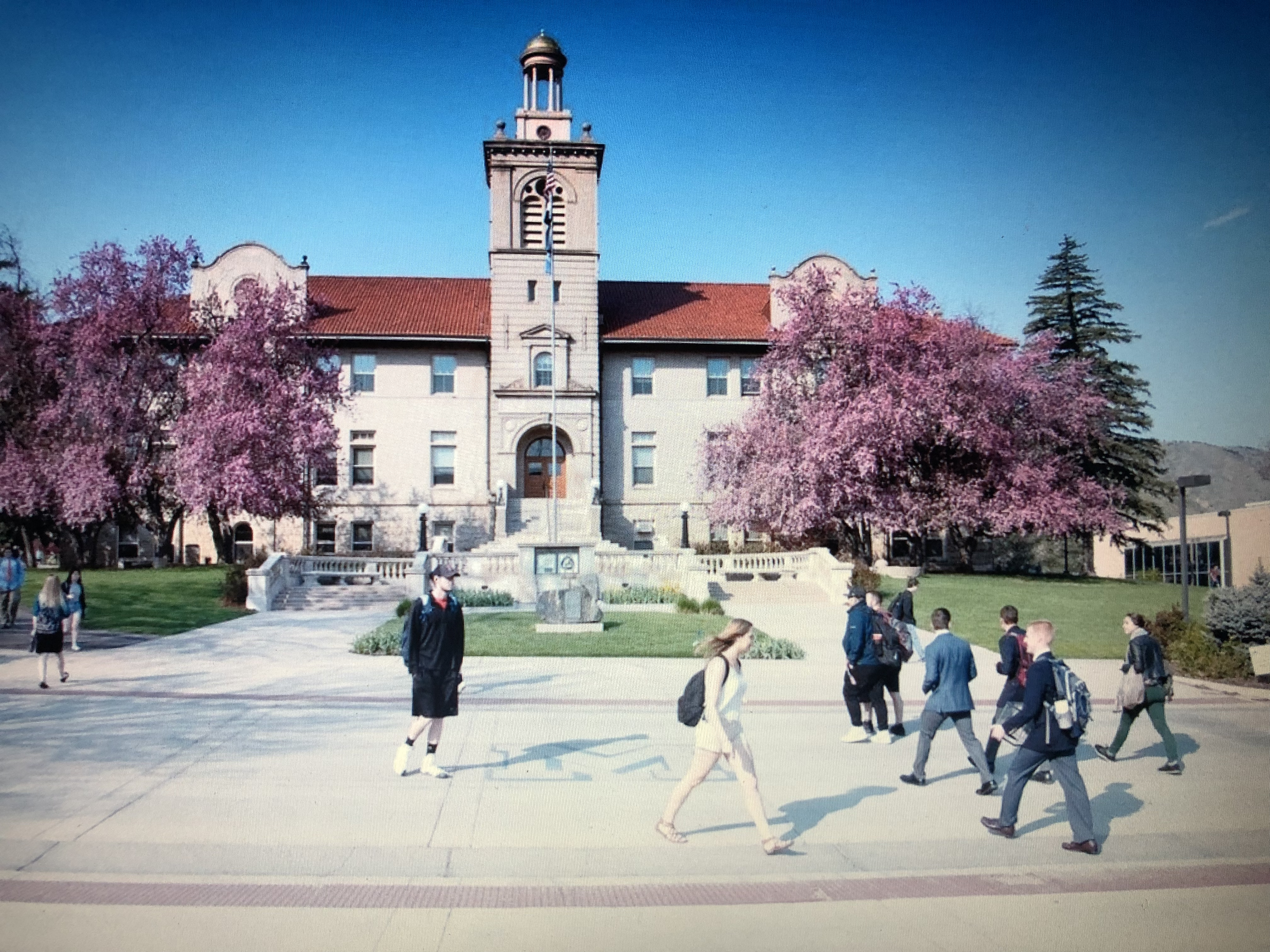
Colorado School of Mines

Becoming an accredited mining engineer requires a university or college degree. Training includes a Bachelor of Engineering (B.Eng. or B.E.), Bachelor of Science (B.Sc. or B.S.), Bachelor of Technology (B.Tech.) or Bachelor of Applied Science (B.A.Sc.) in mining engineering. Depending on the country and jurisdiction, to be licensed as a mining engineer may require a Master of Engineering (M.Eng.), Master of Science (M.Sc. or M.S.) or Master of Applied Science (M.A.Sc.) degree.

Some mining engineers who have come from other disciplines, primarily from engineering fields (e.g.: mechanical, civil, electrical, geomatics or environmental engineering) or from science fields (e.g.: geology, geophysics, physics, geomatics, earth science, or mathematics), typically completing a graduate degree such as M.Eng, M.S., M.Sc. or M.A.Sc. in mining engineering after graduating from a different quantitative undergraduate program.

The fundamental subjects of mining engineering study usually include:

- mathematics; calculus, algebra, numerical analysis, statistics
- geoscience; geochemistry, geophysics, mineralogy, geomatics
- mechanics; rock mechanics, soil Mechanics, geomechanics
- thermodynamics; heat transfer, mass transfer
- hydrogeology
- fluid mechanics; fluid statics, fluid dynamics
- Geostatistics; spatial analysis
- control engineering; control theory, instrumentation
- surface mining; open-pit mining
- underground mining (soft rock)
- underground mining (hard rock)
- computing; DATAMINE, MATLAB, Maptek (Vulcan), Seequent (Leapfrog), GEOVIA (Surpac), Deswik, K-MINE, Micromine, Golden Software (Surfer), MicroStation, Carlson
- drilling and blasting
- solid mechanics; fracture mechanics

In the United States, about 14 universities offer a B.S. degree in mining and mineral engineering. The top rated universities include West Virginia University, South Dakota School of Mines and Technology, Virginia Tech, the University of Kentucky, the University of Arizona, Montana Tech, and Colorado School of Mines. Most of these universities offer M.S. and Ph.D. degrees.

In Canada, there are 19 undergraduate degree programs in mining engineering or equivalent. McGill University Faculty of Engineering offers both undergraduate (B.Sc., B.Eng.) and graduate (M.Sc., Ph.D.) degrees in Mining Engineering. and the University of British Columbia in Vancouver offers a Bachelor of Applied Science (B.A.Sc.) in Mining Engineering and also graduate degrees (M.A.Sc. or M.Eng and Ph.D.) in Mining Engineering.

In Europe, most programs are integrated (B.S. plus M.S. into one) after the Bologna Process and take five years to complete. In Portugal, the University of Porto offers an M.Eng. in Mining and Geo-Environmental Engineering and in Spain the Technical University of Madrid offers degrees in Mining Engineering with tracks in Mining Technology, Mining Operations, Fuels and Explosives, Metallurgy. In the United Kingdom, The Camborne School of Mines offers a wide choice of BEng and MEng degrees in Mining engineering and other Mining related disciplines. This is done through the University of Exeter. In Romania, the University of Petroșani (formerly known as the Petroşani Institute of Mines, or rarely as the Petroşani Institute of Coal) is the only university that offers a degree in Mining Engineering, Mining Surveying or Underground Mining Constructions, albeit, after the closure of Jiu Valley coal mines, those degrees had fallen out of interest for most high-school graduates.

In South Africa, leading institutions include the University of Pretoria, offering a 4-year Bachelor of Engineering (B.Eng in Mining Engineering) as well as post-graduate studies in various specialty fields such as rock engineering and numerical modelling, explosives engineering, ventilation engineering, underground mining methods and mine design; and the University of the Witwatersrand offering a 4-year Bachelor of Science in Engineering (B.Sc.(Eng.)) in Mining Engineering as well as graduate programs (M.Sc.(Eng.) and Ph.D.) in Mining Engineering.

Some mining engineers go on to pursue Doctorate degree programs such as Doctor of Philosophy (Ph.D., DPhil), Doctor of Engineering (D.Eng., Eng.D.). These programs involve a significant original research component and are usually seen as entry points into academia.

In the Russian Federation, 85 universities across all federal districts are training specialists for the mineral resource sector. 36 universities are training specialists for extracting and processing solid minerals (mining). 49 are training specialists for extracting, primary processing, and transporting liquid and gaseous minerals (oil and gas). 37 are training specialists for geological exploration (applied geology, geological exploration). Among the universities that train specialists for the mineral resource sector, 7 are federal universities, and 13 are national research universities of Russia. Personnel training for the mineral resource sector in Russian universities is currently carried out in the following main specializations of training (specialist's degree): "Applied Geology" with the qualification of mining engineer (5 years of training); "Geological Exploration" with the qualification of mining engineer (5 years of training); "Mining" with the qualification of mining engineer (5.5 years of training); "Physical Processes in Mining or Oil and Gas Production" with the qualification of mining engineer (5.5 years of training); "Oil and Gas Engineering and Technologies" with the qualification of mining engineer (5.5 years of training). Universities develop and implement the main professional educational programs of higher education in the directions and specializations of training by forming their profile (name of the program). For example, within the framework of the specialization "Mining", universities often adhere to the classical names of the programs "Open-pit mining", "Underground mining of mineral deposits", "Surveying", "Mineral enrichment", "Mining machines", "Technological safety and mine rescue", "Mine and underground construction", "Blasting work", "Electrification of the mining industry", etc. In the last ten years, under the influence of various factors, new names of programs have begun to appear, such as: "Mining and geological information systems", "Mining ecology", etc. Thus, universities, using their freedom to form new training programs for specialists, can look to the future and try to foresee new professions of mining engineers. After the specialist's degree, you can immediately enrol in postgraduate school (analogue of Doctorate degree programs, four years of training).

== Salary and statistics ==
Similar to other types of engineers, mining engineers have a relatively high salary in comparison to other career fields. Mining engineering is also a stable job market to enter, with job openings being almost always readily available.

Job growth

As a general trend, salaries of mining engineers have been increasing throughout the world. The job is estimated to grow between 2-5% depending on the source, which is slower than most jobs. Although the job growth is small compared to the average growth rate of 14%, there are still many available job openings in the mining industry. This is due to the relatively low number of graduates, and the constant flow of people retiring from the workforce.

Job stability

Mining engineering has extremely high job stability relative to other career paths. Since many industries require mined materials to function, there will always be a need for the mining industry. However, there are concerns about a workforce shortage caused by many people retiring from the industry within the next 10 years. With the current predicted number of employees entering the field, there will not be enough to replace those who are retiring as well as fill the need for new employees from industry growth.

Salary

Mining engineer salaries have been rising globally, with engineers in the United States, Canada, and Australia making the highest earnings relatively. Mining engineers are among the highest-paid engineer grouping, typically placing in the top 10 of most charts. This can partially be attributed to petroleum engineering, a subset of mining engineering, which is particularly lucrative due to high market demand for petroleum.

Country	Average Salary
United States	$121,945
Canada	$125,934
Bahamas	$86,212
Bulgaria	лв 49,124
China	¥ 360,032
Czech Republic	Kč 1,063,590
Ecuador	$37,401
France	€78,633
Germany	€94,959
Hong Kong SAR	$708,776

== Pre-mining ==
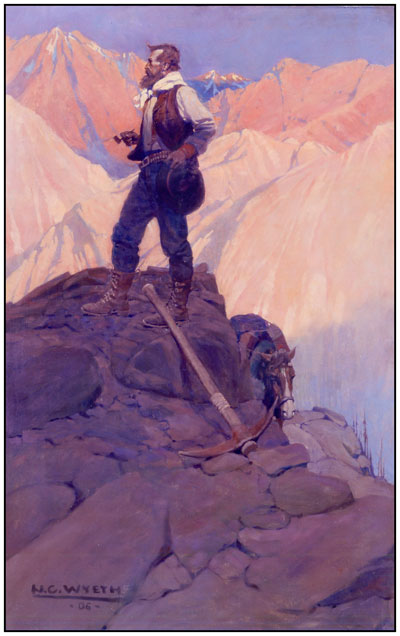
The Prospector by N. C. Wyeth, 1906

As there is considerable capital expenditure required for mining operations, an array of pre-mining activities are normally carried out to assess whether a mining operation would be worthwhile.

Mineral exploration is the process of locating minerals and assessing their concentrations (grade) and quantities (tonnage), to determine if they are commercially viable ores for mining. Mineral exploration is much more intensive, organized, involved, and professional than mineral prospecting – though it frequently utilizes services exploration, enlisting geologists and surveyors in the necessary pre-feasibility study of the possible mining operation. Mineral exploration and estimation of the reserve can determine the profitability conditions and advocate the form and type of mining required.

=== Mineral discovery ===
Mineral discovery can be made from research of mineral maps, academic geological reports, or government geological reports. Other sources of information include property assays and local word of mouth. Mineral research usually includes sampling and analysing sediments, soil, and drill cores. Soil sampling and analysis is one of the most popular mineral exploration tools. Other common tools include satellite and aerial surveys or airborne geophysics, including magneto-metric and gamma-spectrometric maps. Unless the mineral exploration is done on public property, the owners of the property may play a significant role in the exploration process and might be the original discoverers of the mineral deposit.

=== Mineral determination ===
After a prospective mineral is located, the mining geologist and engineer determine the ore properties. This may involve chemical analysis of the ore to determine the sample's composition. Once the mineral properties are identified, the next step is determining the quantity of the ore. This involves determining the extent of the deposit and the purity of the ore. The geologist drills additional core samples to find the limits of the deposit or seam and estimates the quantity of valuable material present.

=== Feasibility study ===
Once the mineral identification and reserve amount are reasonably determined, the next step is to determine the feasibility of recovering the mineral deposit. A preliminary survey shortly after the discovery of the deposit examines the market conditions, such as the supply and demand of the mineral, the amount of ore needed to be moved to recover a certain quantity of that mineral, and analysis of the cost associated with the operation. This pre-feasibility study determines whether the mining project is likely to be profitable; if so, a more in-depth analysis of the deposit is undertaken. After the full extent of the ore body is known and has been examined by engineers, the feasibility study examines the cost of initial capital investment, methods of extraction, the cost of operation, an estimated length of time to pay back the investment, the gross revenue and net profit margin, any possible resale price of the land, the total life of the reserve, the full value of the account, investment in future projects, and the property owner or owners' contract. In addition, environmental impact, reclamation, possible legal ramifications, and all government permitting are considered. These steps of analysis determine whether the mining company and its investors should proceed with the extraction of the minerals or whether the project should be abandoned. The mining company may decide to sell the rights to the reserve to a third party rather than develop it themselves. Alternatively, the decision to proceed with extraction may be postponed indefinitely until market conditions become favourable.

== Mining operation ==
Mining engineers working in an established mine may work as an engineer for operations improvement, further mineral exploration, and operation capitalization by determining where in the mine to add equipment and personnel. The engineer may also work in supervision and management or as an equipment and mineral salesperson. In addition to engineering and operations, the mining engineer may work as an environmental, health, and safety manager or design engineer.

The act of mining requires different methods of extraction depending on the mineralogy, geology, and location of the resources. Characteristics such as mineral hardness, the mineral stratification, and access to that mineral will determine the method of extraction.

Generally, mining is either done from the surface or underground. Mining can also occur with surface and covert operations on the same reserve. Mining activity varies as to what method is employed to remove the mineral.

=== Surface mining ===
Surface mining comprises 90% of the world's mineral tonnage output. Also called open pit mining, surface mining removes minerals in formations near the surface. Ore retrieval is done by material removal from the land in its natural state. Surface mining often alters the land's characteristics, shape, topography, and geological makeup.

Surface mining involves quarrying and excavating minerals through cutting, cleaving, and breaking machinery. Explosives are usually used to facilitate breakage. Hard rocks such as limestone, sand, gravel, and slate are generally quarried into benches.

Using mechanical shovels, track dozers, and front-end loaders, strip mining is done on softer minerals such as clays and phosphate removed. Smoother coal seams can also be extracted this way.

With placer mining, dredge mining can also remove minerals from the bottoms of lakes, rivers, streams, and even the ocean. In addition, in-situ mining can be done from the surface using dissolving agents on the ore body and retrieving the ore via pumping. The pumped material is then set to leach for further processing. Hydraulic mining is utilized as water jets to wash away either overburden or the ore itself.

=== Mining process ===
Blasting
Explosives are used to break up a rock formation and aid in the collection of ore in a process called blasting. Blasting generally the heat and immense pressure of the detonated explosives to shatter and fracture a rock mass. The type of explosives used in mining is high explosives, which vary in composition and performance properties. The mining engineer is responsible for selecting and properly placing these explosives to maximize efficiency and safety. Blasting occurs in many phases of the mining process, such as the development of infrastructure and the production of the ore. An alternative to high explosives are Cardox blasting cartridges, invented in 1931, and extensively used from 1932 in coal mines. The cartridge contains an 'energizer' which heats liquid carbon dioxide until it ruptures a bursting disk; then, a physical explosion of the supercritical fluid.
Leaching
Leaching is the loss or extraction of certain materials from a carrier into a liquid (usually, but not always, a solvent). Mostly used in rare-earth metal extraction.
Flotation
Flotation (also spelled floatation) involves phenomena related to the relative buoyancy of minerals. It is the most widely used metal separating method.
Electrostatic separation
Separating minerals by electro-characteristic differences.
Gravity separation
Gravity separation is an industrial method of separating two components, either a suspension or dry granular mixture, where separating the components with gravity is sufficiently practical.
Magnetic separation
Magnetic separation is a process in which magnetically susceptible material is extracted from a mixture using a magnetic force.
Hydraulic separation
Hydraulic separation is a process that uses the density difference to separate minerals. Before hydraulic separation, minerals were crushed into uniform sizes; minerals with uniform sizes and densities will have different settling velocities in water, which can be used to separate target minerals.

== Mining health and safety ==
Legal attention to health and safety in mining began in the late 19th century with general safety codes being added to most mining environments. Since then, it has become a widespread practice across the world to have specific, detailed mine safety regulations. This is important because working in the mining field presents many dangers to workers and having safety codes minimizes potential workplace accidents.

Mining engineers, as employees of the mines, have to follow these safety codes in their work. Mine safety engineers, a subset of mining engineers, specifically with creating and implementing these safety regulations. They work with the documentation and analysis of mining disasters to ensure that, when possible, the same mistakes are not repeated twice.

=== United States ===
The United States Congress, through the passage of the Federal Mine Safety and Health Act of 1977, known as the Miner's Act, created the Mine Safety and Health Administration (MSHA) under the US Department of Labour. The act provides miners with rights against retaliation for reporting violations, consolidated regulation of coal mines with metallic and non-metallic mines, and created the independent Federal Mine Safety and Health Review Commission to review violations reported to MSHA.

The act codified in Code of Federal Regulations § 30 (CFR § 30) covers all miners at an active mine. When a mining engineer works at an active mine, they are subject to the same rights, violations, mandatory health and safety regulations, and compulsory training as any other worker at the mine. The mining engineer can be legally identified as a "miner".

The act establishes the rights of miners. The miner may report at any time a hazardous condition and request an inspection. The miners may elect a miners' representative to participate during an inspection, pre-inspection meeting, and post-inspection conference. The miners and miners' representatives shall be paid for their time during all inspections and investigations.

=== India ===
A large portion of India's mining industry is regulated by the Mines Act of 1952 and the Mine Rules of 1955. These codes outline all of the operational, health and safety standards that all mines must follow. Some subsections, such as the Coal Mine Regulation of 2017, have been created to outline practices in more niche subsections of mining. This enforcement of these codes is managed by the Directorate-General of Mines Safety (DGMS) under the Union Ministry of Labour & Employment (MOL&E). Since these outlines are laws, they can also have legal consequences such as fines, mining license revocation, and imprisonment. Mining engineers work closely to ensure that these codes are followed on an individual scale.

==== Mines Act of 1952 ====
The Mines Act of 1952 outlines the proper procedure for the operation of mines and implements their health and safety standards. One example of this is the implementation of a mandatory day of rest for workers, which prevents workers from working more than six days out of a week. An example of a safety standard is the requirement for proper first aid kit components for the kits that should be present in every mine.

This act also notes the beginning of the practice of documenting health and safety in incidents in mines. Since these incidents have started being recorded, the number of accidents in coal mines has consistently dropped. The main categories currently being reported on are fatalities and serious accidents, uncategorized by type or cause of accident. Mining engineers work on the reporting of these incidents and seek to create regulations that will prevent future incidents from occurring.

==== Mine Rules of 1955 ====
This act clarifies the legal structure and consequences of health and safety regulation of mines in India. It defines what reports are needed for and from employees as well as what documentation should be taken in mines. This can include medical records, inspection documents, and mining licensure.

The act also outlines welfare and benefits that should be given to all employees working in the mines. This includes the need for welfare management staff in all mines that employ more than 500 employees. Mining engineers also receive these benefits.

=== Australia ===
Legislation on the inspection and safety of mines in Australia can be dated back to the early 1900s with the Mine and Works Inspection Act of 1920 from South Australia. There is also a large increase in legislation starting around 1999 and continuing into the present day throughout the rest of the states and territories.

Most of the states and territories of Australia also follow the WHS, a largely uniform code that details health and safety in the workplace. The WHS (Work Health and Safety) of mines in Australia is overseen by states and territories rather than the central government, so there can be minor discrepancies between each state or territory's code. Beyond this, many of the states and territories have also enforced additional regulations on mines specifically in their legislation.

Mining engineers in Australia, like in other countries, closely monitor and create accident reports. Being the country with the 3rd largest total of coal reserves in the world, there is a large subsection of mining engineers who work specifically with coal mines and coal mine-related disasters. (6)

State/Territory	Mining Legislation
New South Wales	Work Health and Safety Act 2011 Work Health and Safety Regulation 2017 Work Health and Safety (Mines and Petroleum Sites) Act 2013 Work Health and Safety (Mines and Petroleum Sites) Act 2022
Victoria	Chapter 5.3 of the Occupational Health and Safety Regulations 2017
Queensland	Work Health and Safety Act 2011 Work Health and Safety Regulation 2011 Mining and Quarrying Safety and Health Act 1999 Mining and Quarrying Safety and Health Regulation 2017 Coal Mining Safety and Health Act 1999 Coal Mining Safety and Health Regulation 2017
Western Australia	Work health and Safety Act 2020 Work Health and Safety (General) Regulations 2022 Work Health and Safety (Mines) Regulations 2022
South Australia	Work Health and Safety Act 2012 Work Health and Safety Regulations 2012 Mines and Works Inspections Act 1920 Mines and Works Inspections Regulations 2013
Tasmania	Work Health and Safety Act 2012 Work Health and Safety Regulations 2022 Mines Work Health and Safety (Supplementary Requirements) Act 2012 Mines Work Health and Safety (Supplementary Requirements) Regulations 2022
Australian Capital Territory	Work Health and Safety Act 2011 Work Health and Safety Regulation 2011
Northern Territory	Work Health and Safety (National Uniform Legislation) Act 2011 Chapter 10 (Mines) of the Work Health and Safety (National Uniform Legislation) Regulations 2011

== Environmental concerns ==
Waste and uneconomic material generated from the mineral extraction process are the primary source of pollution in the vicinity of mines. Mining activities, by their nature, cause a disturbance of the natural environment in and around which the minerals are located. Mining engineers should therefore be concerned not only with the production and processing of mineral products but also with the mitigation of damage to the environment both during and after mining as a result of the change in the mining area.

== See also ==
- School of mines
- Underground construction
- Automated mining
- Geological engineering
- Mining machinery engineering
- List of mining journals

== Footnotes ==
This article incorporates text by Petrov, V. L. available under the CC BY 4.0 license.
