= Surface map =

2D representation of a 3D surface

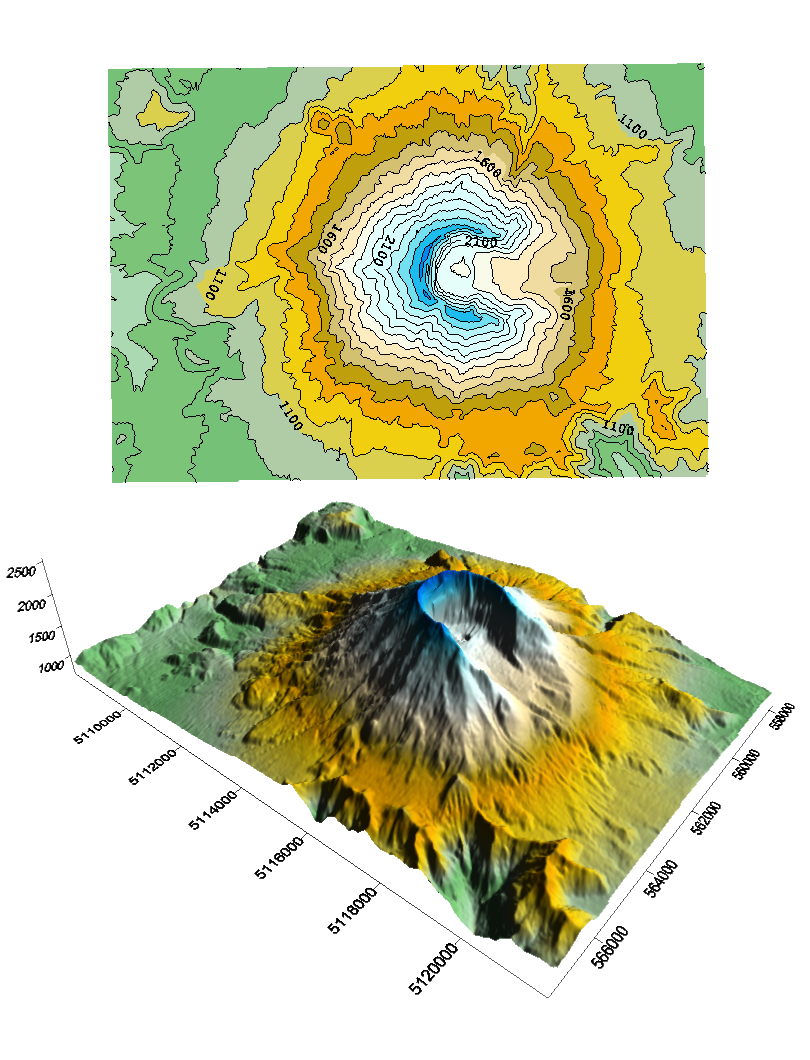
A 3D surface map of Mt. St. Helens with a 2D contour map above for comparison.

In mathematics, geology, and cartography, a surface map is a 2D perspective representation of a 3-dimensional surface. Surface maps usually represent real-world entities such as landforms or the surfaces of objects. They can, however, serve as an abstraction where the third, or even all of the dimensions correspond to non-spatial data. In this capacity they act more as graphs than maps.

== Key features ==
=== Isobars ===
1. Lines of equal atmospheric pressure.
2. Help identify high-pressure systems (anticyclones) and low-pressure systems (cyclones).
3. Closely spaced isobars indicate strong winds, while widely spaced isobars signify calm conditions.

=== Fronts ===
1. Boundaries between air masses of different temperatures and moisture levels.
2. Include warm fronts, cold fronts, stationary fronts, and occluded fronts.
3. Represented with specific symbols (e.g., triangles for cold fronts, semicircles for warm fronts).

=== Station models ===
1. Small plots at various locations on the map, showing weather conditions at individual weather stations.
2. Include details like:
  - Temperature (in °C or °F).
  - Dew point (a measure of humidity).
  - Wind speed and direction (often represented by barbs).
  - Atmospheric pressure (corrected to sea level).
  - Cloud cover and precipitation.
3. Wind Patterns:
  - Indicated by arrows or wind barbs, showing the direction and relative speed of the wind.
  - Useful for determining the movement of weather systems.
4. Temperature Gradients:
  - Often visualized with color shading or contour lines (isotherms) to represent regions of varying temperatures.

=== Applications ===
- Weather Forecasting: Surface maps help meteorologists identify and track weather systems like storms, fronts, and pressure zones.
- Aviation and Maritime Operations: Used for planning routes and ensuring safety based on weather conditions.
- Agriculture: Helps farmers prepare for upcoming weather, such as frost or precipitation.

=== Data sources ===
Surface maps are generated using data from:

- Ground-based weather stations.
- Automated weather observation systems.
- Synoptic weather reports from international meteorological organizations.
