= PERC Reporting Standard =

European standard for mineral reporting

Logo of the PERC - Pan-European Reserves + Resources Reporting Committee

The PERC Standard for Reporting of Exploration Results, Mineral Resources and Mineral Reserves (the "PERC Reporting Standard") sets out the minimum standards, as well as additional guidelines and recommendations for the public reporting of exploration results, mineral resources and mineral reserves within Europe.

It applies to all solid mineral raw materials for which public reporting of exploration results, mineral resources and mineral reserves is required by any relevant regulatory authority.

The PERC Reporting Standard is fully aligned with the CRIRSCO International Reporting Template.

The CRIRSCO International Reporting Template is a document that represents the best of the CRIRSCO-style codes for the public reporting of exploration results, mineral resources and mineral reserves that are recognised and adopted world-wide for market-related reporting and financial investment.

The CRIRSCO Template family of reporting codes and standards is complementary to the United Nations Framework Classification for Resources (UNFC) which was initially developed in 1997 to support the development of mineral inventories by government organisations but has since been expanded to cover a range of other sectors. The CRIRSCO Template has been endorsed by the UNECE's Expert Group on Resource Management as a UNFC Aligned System for use in classifying estimates for minerals projects. Details of the relationship between the two systems are provided in the CRIRSCO Template to UNFC Bridging Document] which was originally published in 2015 and since updated in 2024 to reference the 2019 versions of both systems (UNECE, 2024). Additional guidance for users of the bridging document is provided in an accompanying guidance note ( CRIRSCO and UNECE, 2024).

== History ==
During the 1960s, it was realised that minerals reporting was not being undertaken in the best interests of the investors. The Australasian 'Joint Ore Reserves Committee – JORC was formed in 1971 because of concerns about the increase in unacceptable reporting practices (e.g., the Poseidon bubble). The JORC Code was first published in 1989, with the guidelines published in 1990.

During the 1990s, it became clear that the evaluation of mineral deposits should be based on an internationally recognised code of reporting to improve the security of investments in this economic sector (e.g., the Bre-X case).

In 1994, a global representative body, now the 'Combined Reserves International Reporting Standards Committee' – CRIRSCO, was formed to create a set of standard international definitions for reporting mineral resources and mineral/ore reserves, modelled on the JORC Code.

In 1997, the participating countries of CRIRSCO – Australia, Canada, South Africa, USA and the UK reached an agreement on these definitions and presented a document defining the two main categories, Mineral Resources and Mineral Reserves, and their associated subcategories (Measured, Indicated and Inferred Mineral Resources and Proved and Probable Mineral Reserves).

In 2001, the first new standard based on these definitions, 'The Reporting Code', was published. It set out minimum standards, recommendations, and guidelines for public reporting of mineral exploration results, mineral resources, and mineral reserves in the United Kingdom, Ireland, and Europe.

With the publication of the updated CRIRSCO Template in 2006, it was recognised that an update to 'The Reporting Code' would be needed. A new committee was formed, with a Europe-wide remit: the 'Pan-European Reserves & Resources Reporting Committee' – PERC.

The first Pan European Code for Reporting of Exploration Results, Mineral Resources and Reserves ('The PERC Reporting Code') was published in 2008.

Since that time, CRIRSCO has continued to introduce improvements and modifications to its reporting template, allowing all CRIRSCO members to use identical wording for key definitions, such as resources and reserves, public reports, competence criteria, and feasibility/pre-feasibility reports.

PERC renamed the PERC Reporting Code (2008 edition) to the PERC Reporting Standard with the 2013 revision. A subsequent revision to the PERC Reporting Standard was undertaken in 2017, and a further revision was published in late 2021.

A detailed account of the historical development of the PERC Reporting Standard can be found on the PERC website.

== Application of the PERC Standard ==
The Standard is applicable to all solid mineral raw materials for which public reporting of exploration results, mineral resources and mineral reserves is required by the relevant regulatory authorities. Solid raw materials include (but are not limited to):

- diamonds and other gemstones;
- metalliferous minerals and
- industrial minerals;
- decorative and ornamental stones (dimension stones);
- cement feed materials and construction raw materials;
- other mineral raw materials; and,
- coal.

The Standard is binding on the individual members of the Participating Organisations. These rules are subject to national laws and regulations and to laws and regulations of the EU and EFTA member states, the UK and other European countries as and when appropriate.

== Public reports and the PERC Standard ==
Companies are encouraged to provide information in their public reports, which is as comprehensive as possible. A company's economic interest in the project must be declared. Previously reported information does not need to be repeated in new reports but the earlier published information must be clearly referred to, and must be available on the company website or in other easily accessible form.

The Standard also applies to the following reports if they have been prepared for the purpose of public reporting, or if they include, exploration results, mineral resources estimates, or mineral reserves estimates:

- environmental statements;
- information memoranda;
- expert reports; and
- technical papers referring to exploration results, mineral resources or mineral reserves

== Reporting terminology ==
Public reports must use the categories shown in the Figure below when reporting on exploration results, mineral resources and mineral reserves:

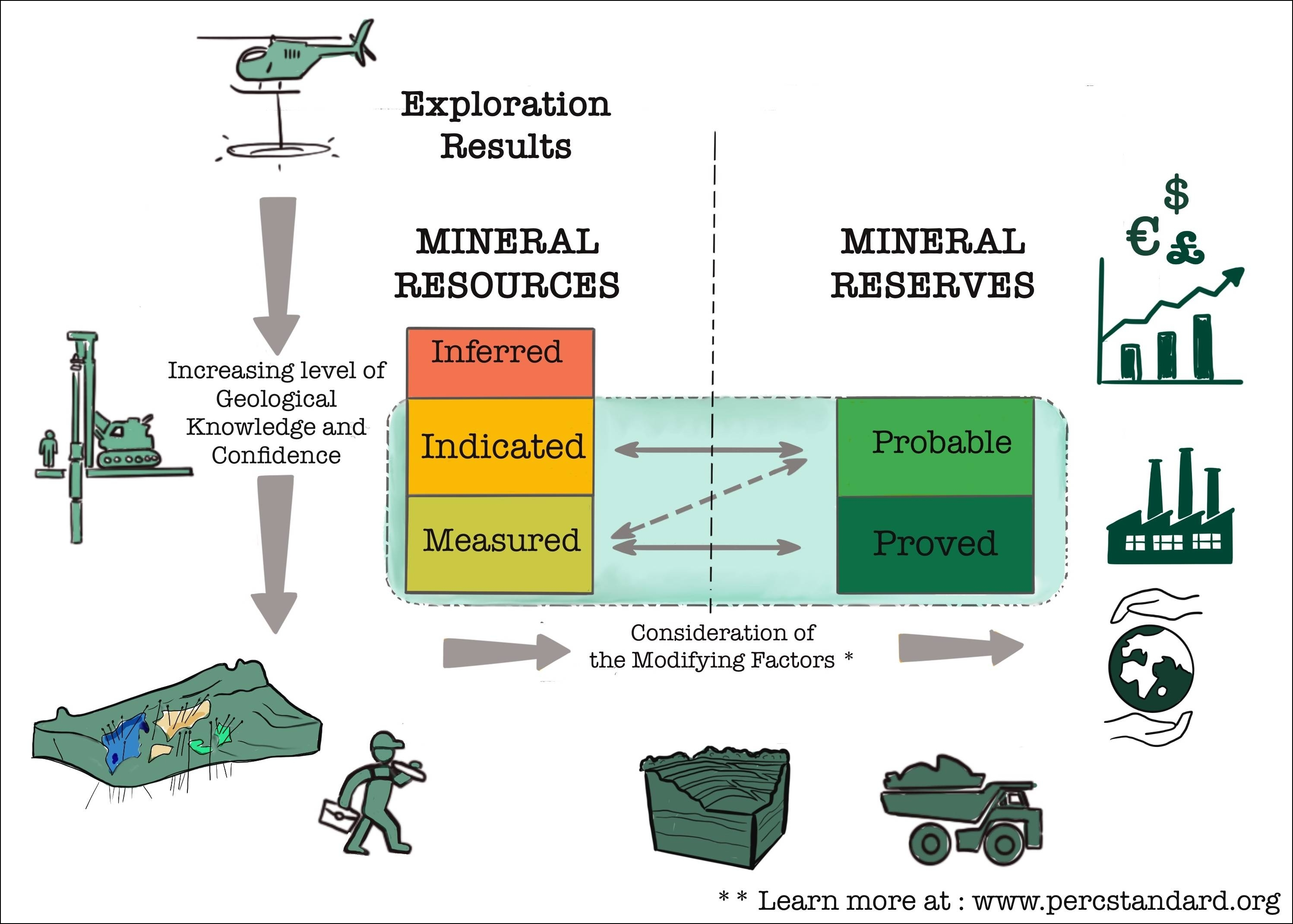
Figure showing the relationship between exploration results, mineral resources and mineral reserves

The exact definitions of key terms like 'Modifying Factors', 'Inferred'-, 'Indicated'- and 'Measured Mineral Resources' as well as 'Probable' or 'Proved Mineral Reserves' are documented in the PERC Reporting Standard.

== PERC Committee ==
The Pan-European Reserves & Resources Reporting Committee – PERC is the organisation responsible for setting standards for public reporting of exploration results, mineral resources, and mineral reserves by companies listed on European markets.

PERC is formally registered as a legal entity (a not-for-profit organisation) in Brussels, at the office of one of its parent organisations, the European Federation of Geologists.

PERC is a constituent member of the Committee for Mineral Reserves International Reporting Standards – CRIRSCO and is the European equivalent of JORC in Australasia, CIM in Canada, SAMREC in South Africa and similar reserves standards bodies elsewhere. National Instrument 43-101, The legislation which specifies 'Standards of Disclosure' for Mineral Projects within Canada, is broadly comparable to the CRIRSCO reporting codes and standards.

PERC comprises a number of 'Participating Organisations', each of which has a right to nominate members onto the committee. The current member organisations of PERC are:

- the European Federation of Geologists (EFG)
- the Fennoscandian Association for Metals and Minerals Professionals (FAMMP)
- the Geological Society of London (GSL)
- the Iberian Mining Engineers Board (IMEB)
- the Institute of Geologists of Ireland (IGI)
- the Institute of Materials, Minerals, and Mining (IOM3)

Representation on PERC covers major and junior mining sectors, industrial minerals, aggregates, coal, the investment and financial community, and the professional accreditation organisations.

=== Activities ===
The principal activities of PERC are:

- to manage and update the PERC Reporting Standard;
- to represent the European region on CRIRSCO, the international body harmonising reserves reporting standards around the world;
- to liaise with ESMA, the London Stock Exchange, AIM, FSA and other stock exchanges and regulators in Europe, to assist them to incorporate into their rules the use of the PERC Reporting Standard in particular and CRIRSCO aligned codes in general;
- to promote good practice in the reporting of mineral resources and mineral reserves; and
- participation as advisers in national and international minerals statistics and similar projects.

== See also ==
- Pan African Resource Reporting Code
- United Nations Framework Classification for Resources
- United Nations Resource Management System
