= Mineral resource classification =

Economic classification systems used for minerals

There are several classification systems for the economic evaluation of mineral deposits worldwide. The most commonly used schemes base on the International Reporting Template, developed by the CRIRSCO – Committee for Mineral Reserves International Reporting Standards, like the Australian Joint Ore Reserves Committee – JORC Code 2012, the Pan-European Reserves & Resources Reporting Committee' – PERC Reporting Standard from 2021, the Canadian Institute of Mining, Metallurgy and Petroleum – CIM classification and the South African Code for the Reporting of Mineral Resources and Mineral Reserves (SAMREC). A more detailed description of the historical development concerning reporting about mineral deposits can be found on the PERC web site. In 1997, the United Nations Framework Classification for Resources (UNFC) was development by the United Nations Economic Commission for Europe (UNECE). The Pan African Resource Reporting Code (PARC) is based on UNFC.

== Mineral resources ==
A 'mineral resource' is a concentration or occurrence of material of intrinsic economic interest in or on the Earth's crust in such form, quality and quantity that there are reasonable prospects for eventual economic extraction. Mineral resources are further sub-divided, in order of increasing geological confidence, into inferred, indicated and measured as categories.

- Inferred mineral resource is the part of a mineral resource for which quantity, grade (or quality) and mineral content can be estimated with a low level of confidence. It is inferred from geological evidence and assumed—but not verified—geological or grade continuity. It is based on information gathered through appropriate techniques from such locations as outcrops, trenches, pits, workings and drill holes which may be of limited or uncertain quality and also its reliability.
- Indicated resources are simply economic mineral occurrences that have been sampled (from such locations as outcrops, trenches, pits and drill holes) to a point where an estimate has been made, at a reasonable level of confidence, of their contained metal, grade, tonnage, shape, densities, physical characteristics.
- Measured resources are indicated resources that have undergone enough further sampling that a 'competent person' (defined by the norms of the relevant mining code; usually a geologist) has declared them to be an acceptable estimate, at a high degree of confidence, of the grade (or quality), quantity, shape, densities, physical characteristics of the mineral occurrence.

The Canadian legislation (NI 43-101) concerning mineral projects within Canada appears to be similar to the CRIRSCO based reporting codes and standards. Generally, the classification of mineral deposits bases on an increasing level of geological/mineralogical knowledge about a mineral deposit. According to the CRIRSCO International Reporting Template, mineral deposits are classified as mineral resources or mineral reserves.

== Mineral reserves ==
A Mineral Reserve is the economically mineable part of a Measured Mineral Resource and/or Indicated Mineral Resource. Mineral Reserves are subdivided in order of increasing confidence into:

- Probable Mineral Reserve is the economically mineable part of an Indicated Mineral Resource, and in some circumstances, a Measured Mineral Resources. It includes diluting material and allowances for losses which may occur when the material is mined. A Probable Mineral Reserve has a lower level of confidence than a Proved Mineral Reserve but is of sufficient quality to serve as the basis for decision on the development of deposit.
- Proved Mineral Reserve is the economically mineable part of a Measured Mineral Resource. It includes diluting materials and allowances for losses which occur when the material is mined. It represents the highest confidence category of Mineral Reserve estimate. It implies a high degree of confidence in the geological factors and a high degree of confidence in the Modifying Factors. The style of mineralization or other factors could mean that Proved Mineral Reserves are not achievable in some deposits.

== Mineral resource estimation ==
=== Block model estimation ===
To determine and define the ore tonnage and grade of a geological deposit, from the developed block model, a mineral resource estimation is used. There are different estimation methods used for different scenarios dependent upon the ore boundaries, geological deposit geometry, grade variability and the amount of time and money available. A typical resource estimation involves the construction of a geological and resource model with data from various sources.

Once the geological modeling is completed, the geological envelopes are divided into block models. Subsequently, the estimation of these blocks is done from "composites" that are point measures of the grade of ore in the rock. Several different mathematical methods can be used to do the estimation depending on the desired degree of precision, quality and quantity of data and of their nature.

==== Nearest neighbor method ====
The nearest neighbor method assigns grade values to blocks from the nearest sample point to the block. Closest sample gets a weight of one; all others get a weight of zero. In two dimensions, this method generates a Voronoi diagram composed of polygons each with a unique grade; in three dimensions this method generates a Voronoi diagram composed of polyhedra each with a unique grade.

20 points and their Voronoi cells (larger version below).

In mathematics, a Voronoi diagram is a partitioning of a plane into regions based on distance to points in a specific subset of the plane. That set of points (called seeds, sites, or generators) is specified beforehand, and for each seed there is a corresponding region consisting of all points closer to that seed than to any other. These regions are called Voronoi cells. The Voronoi diagram of a set of points is dual to its Delaunay triangulation. Put simply, it is a diagram created by taking pairs of points that are close together and drawing a line that is equidistant between them and perpendicular to the line connecting them. That is, all points on the lines in the diagram are equidistant to the nearest two (or more) source points.

This method is easy to understand calculate manually, but it produces biased estimates of grade and tonnage above an ore waste cut-off. Which is called the volume variance relationship i.e. the variability of the grade distribution depends on the volume of samples. Large volume samples mean small variability whereas small volume samples mean large variability.

==== Inverse distance weighting method ====
The name "inverse distance weighting method" was motivated by the weighted average applied, since it resorts to the inverse of the distance to each known point ("amount of proximity") when assigning weights. This method is computationally simple and flexible, but the preferential sampling makes estimates unreliable.

The simplest weighting function in common usage is based upon the inverse of the distance of the sample from the point to be estimated, usually raised to the second power, although higher or lower powers may be useful.

$$w_i =  \left[\frac{1}{d_i}\right]^p$$

Samples closer to the point of interest get a higher weighting than samples farther away. Samples closer to the point of estimation are more likely to be similar in grade. Such inverse distance techniques introduce issues such as sample search and declustering decisions, and cater for the estimation of blocks of a defined size, in addition to point estimates.

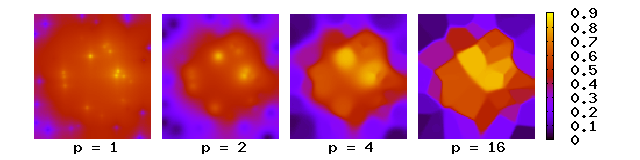
Inverse distance interpolation for different power parameters p, from scattered points on the surface $z=\exp(-x^2-y^2)$.

==== Kriging ====
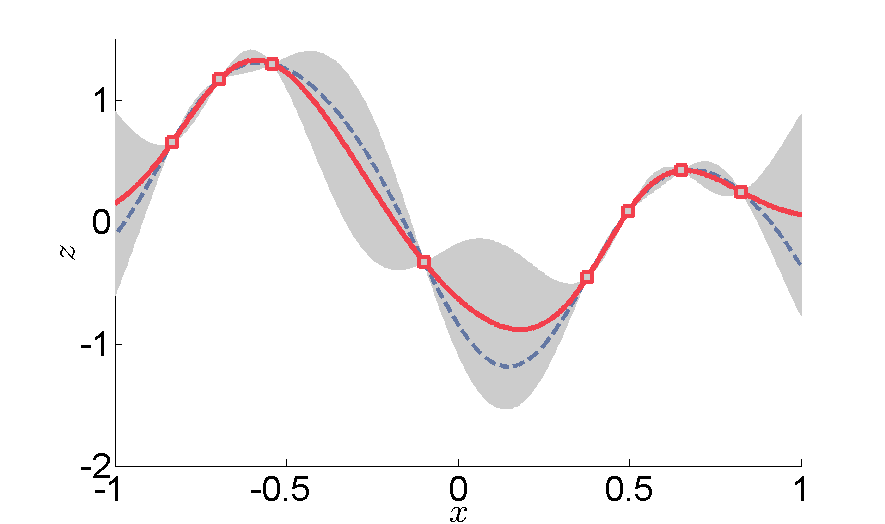
Example of one-dimensional data interpolation by Kriging, with confidence intervals. Squares indicate the location of the data. The Kriging interpolation, shown in red, runs along the means of the normally distributed confidence intervals shown in gray. The dashed curve shows a spline that while smooth nevertheless departs significantly from the expected intermediate values given by those means.

In statistics, originally in geostatistics, Kriging or Gaussian process regression is a method of interpolation for which the interpolated values are modeled by a Gaussian process governed by prior covariances, as opposed to a piecewise-polynomial spline chosen to optimize smoothness of the fitted values. Under suitable assumptions on the priors, Kriging gives the best linear unbiased prediction of the intermediate values. Interpolating methods based on other criteria such as smoothness need not yield the most likely intermediate values. The method is widely used in the domain of spatial analysis and computer experiments. The technique is also known as Wiener–Kolmogorov prediction, after Norbert Wiener and Andrey Kolmogorov.

The theoretical basis for the method was developed by the French mathematician Georges Matheron based on the Master's thesis of Danie G. Krige, the pioneering plotter of distance-weighted average gold grades at the Witwatersrand reef complex in South Africa. Krige sought to estimate the most likely distribution of gold based on samples from a few boreholes. The English verb is to krige and the most common noun is Kriging; both are often pronounced with a hard "g", following the pronunciation of the name "Krige".

This method is good in local and global estimates, but hard to comprehend, computationally intensive, and the flexibility and power created by many parameters also create arbitrariness and more possibilities for error.

=== Resource block model ===
The block model is created using geostatistics and the geological data gathered through drilling of the prospective ore zone. The block model is essentially a set of specifically sized "blocks" in the shape of the mineralized orebody. Although the blocks all have the same size, the characteristics of each block differ. The grade, density, rock type and confidence are all unique to each block within the entire block model. An example of a block model is shown on the right. Once the block model has been developed and analyzed, it is used to determine the ore resources and reserves (with project economics considerations) of the mineralized orebody. Mineral resources and reserves can be further classified depending on their geological confidence.

A mineral resource can be explained as a concentration or occurrence of diamonds, natural solid inorganic material, or natural solid fossilized organic material including base and precious metals, coal, and industrial minerals in or on the Earth's crust in such form and quantity and of such a grade or quality that it has reasonable prospects for economic extraction. The location, quantity, grade, geological characteristics and continuity of a mineral resource are known, estimated or interpreted from specific geological evidence and knowledge.

A Mineral Reserve is the economically mineable part of a Measured or Indicated Mineral Resource demonstrated by at least a Preliminary Feasibility Study. This Study must include adequate information on mining, processing, metallurgical, economic and other relevant factors that demonstrate, at the time of reporting, that economic extraction can be justified. A Mineral Reserve includes diluting materials and allowances for losses that may occur when the material is mined.

== Bre-X scandal ==
When the Bre-X Minerals ltd. scandal was revealed in the spring of 1997, it was one of the largest core salting scams in history and galvanised the development of the NI 43–101 reporting standards. While not the first (Tapin Copper salted samples in the 1970s), it is one of the most popular and the catalyst for reporting reform.

Bre-X was a group of companies in Canada. A major part of the group, Bre-X Minerals Ltd. based in Calgary, was involved in a major gold mining scandal when it reported it was sitting on an enormous gold deposit at Busang, Indonesia (in Borneo). Bre-X bought the Busang site in March 1993 and in October 1995 announced significant amounts of gold had been discovered, sending its stock price soaring. Originally a penny stock, its stock price reached a peak at CAD $286.50 (split adjusted) in May 1996 on the Toronto Stock Exchange (TSE), with a total capitalization of over CAD $6 billion. Bre-X Minerals collapsed in 1997 after the gold samples were found to be a fraud.

The purpose of the National Instrument 43-101 is to ensure that misleading, erroneous or fraudulent information relating to mineral properties is not published and promoted to investors on the stock exchanges overseen by the Canadian Securities Authority. It was created after the Bre-X scandal to protect investors from unsubstantiated mineral project disclosures.

The promulgation of a codified reporting scheme makes it more difficult for fraud to occur and reassures investors that the projects have been assessed in a scientific and professional manner. However, even properly and professionally investigated mineral deposits are not necessarily economic, nor does the presence of a NI 43-101-, JORC- or SAMREC and SAMVAL-compliant CPR or QPR necessarily mean that it is a good investment.

== See also ==
- Economic geology
- Mineral economics
- Mineral exploration
- Ore genesis
- Ore
- PERC Reporting Standard 2021
- Pan African Resource Reporting Code (PARC 2023)
- National Instrument 43-101
- United Nations Framework Classification for Resources
- United Nations Resource Management System
- Valuation (finance) § Valuation of mining projects
