= Gold (2016 film) =

2016 film by Stephen Gaghan

- Theatrical release poster
- Directed by: Stephen Gaghan
- Written by: Patrick Massett; John Zinman
- Produced by: Matthew McConaughey; Patrick Massett; John Zinman; Teddy Schwarzman; Michael Nozik
- Starring: Matthew McConaughey; Édgar Ramírez; Bryce Dallas Howard; Corey Stoll; Toby Kebbell; Craig T. Nelson; Stacy Keach; Bruce Greenwood
- Cinematography: Robert Elswit
- Edited by: Douglas Crise
- Music by: Daniel Pemberton
- Production companies: Black Bear Pictures; HWY 61; Sierra/Affinity; Boies/Schiller Films
- Distributed by: TWC-Dimension
- Release date: December 30, 2016 (United States)
- Running time: 121 minutes
- Country: United States
- Language: English
- Budget: $20 million
- Box office: $14.9 million

Gold is a 2016 American crime drama film directed by Stephen Gaghan and written by Patrick Massett and John Zinman. The film stars Matthew McConaughey, Édgar Ramírez, Bryce Dallas Howard, Corey Stoll, Toby Kebbell, Craig T. Nelson, Stacy Keach and Bruce Greenwood. The film is loosely based on the true story of the 1997 Bre-X mining scandal, when a massive gold deposit was supposedly discovered in the jungles of Indonesia; however, for legal reasons and to enhance the appeal of the film, character names and story details were changed.

Principal photography began on June 29, 2015, in New York City, New Mexico and Thailand. The film had a limited release in the United States on December 30, 2016, before going wide on January 27, 2017. It received mixed reviews from critics and grossed nearly $15 million against a $20 million budget. The film received a Golden Globe nomination for Best Original Song.

== Plot ==
In 1981, Kenny Wells helps to run a prospecting company, Washoe, with his father whom he clearly admires. But seven years after his father dies, the business and Kenny are nearly broke after having lost the office, so Kenny and his colleagues now work from his girlfriend's bar.

Kenny, now living with his girlfriend, Kay, has a dream that leads him to Indonesia where he meets up with geologist Michael Acosta. Both are struggling financially, but Kenny manages to convince Mike to go into business to acquire a gold prospect. Kenny then flies back to America and raises the promised money to finance their venture.

Unfortunately, the exploration program struggles and fails to show any gold, so the workers soon leave until Mike persuades them to come back with the promise of freshwater. Kenny contracts malaria and is bedridden for the next few weeks. When he finally wakes up, Mike reveals that they have had a strike and now have a huge gold deposit.

After celebrating, Kenny goes back to America where he sets up a new office for Washoe and is approached by a major Wall Street bank. Mike accompanies Kenny to their meeting and, after a disagreement, decides to bring some of the bank associates to Indonesia in order to show them the mine. This wins the bank over and it invests $20 million in Washoe, leading the venture to become a public company. Washoe proves to be a huge success and increases 70 points in its first day on the stock market.

Kenny's life becomes celebratory as he goes from one party to the next, but Kay, fearing that she will be tricked and cut out, argues with him and then leaves after seeing him flirting with another woman, Rachel Hill. He is interrupted by Mark Hancock, a high-profile executive of a major mining company, who approaches him regarding buying the company. Kenny meets with him the next day and is offered $300 million for a portion of the mine, but his company's name would be removed. Offended by this, Kenny declines the offer and storms out. The next day on his way into the office Mike phones to tell Kenny that the Indonesian Government has closed the mine; it is also revealed that a previous US president sits on the board in Hancock's company and that he is a friend of the Indonesian president Suharto.

Kenny is disconsolate and seems to be defeated, but Mike flies to the US and offers a plan to win their mine back. They manage to convince the president's son to join them in business after Kenny proves himself by stroking a tiger. The mine is reopened with Washoe receiving 15% of what now is a $30 billion business.

Kenny thinks of going back to Kay but, seeing her flirting with another man at her new job, decides against it. Kenny is then told that he has been honored with a golden pickaxe, the greatest prize for a prospector. The evening of the presentation comes, and he goes with Mike, who walks out during Kenny's speech.

The next day something has gone wrong as Kenny drives to his office and has to push his way through an angry crowd of people. It is then announced that Mike had faked the whole mine as he planted gold in the samples using a method called 'salting'. The gold that he planted was in fact 'river gold' that had been seen earlier in the film. Mike had traded freshwater for the people's river gold so that he could fake the gold mine. Mike is reported to have fled.

Kenny is then questioned by the FBI. He retells his story from a chair in his hotel room that he now cannot afford. The FBI agents seem to believe him and state that Mike was later captured by the Indonesian authorities while on the run and then possibly forced to jump out of a helicopter, some 1000 feet above the jungle. The corpse had its hands and face chewed clean off by wild animals, so Acosta's death is never proven. The agents also say that both the Indonesian minister and Mike dumped their stocks before the scandal broke and that Mike possessed $164 million when he fled.

Kenny returns to Kay's house where he apologizes and later looks through his mail received since they have been apart. He opens one envelope and finds the napkin Mike and he signed as a contract, reading "50–50". Beneath the napkin is a deposit slip for $82 million to First Bank of Gibraltar, Queens Lane Branch, United Kingdom.

== Cast ==
- Matthew McConaughey as Kenny Wells, based on Bre-X CEO David Walsh.
- Édgar Ramírez as Michael Acosta, a geologist based on Michael de Guzman.
- Bryce Dallas Howard as Kay, Wells' longtime girlfriend.
- Joshua Harto as Lloyd Stanton, the businessman's bank account manager.
- Timothy Simons as Jeff Jackson, a Wall Street banker who is coaxed by the duo to inspect the potential value of the company in the jungles of Borneo.
- Michael Landes as Glen Binkert
- Corey Stoll as Brian Woolf, a New York investment banker.
- Toby Kebbell as Paul Jennings, an FBI agent.
- Bruce Greenwood as Mark Hancock, boss of a major competitor.
- Stacy Keach as Clive Coleman
- Bill Camp as Hollis Dresher
- Rachael Taylor as Rachel Hill, an aggressively flirtatious finance hotshot.
- Macon Blair as Connie Wright
- Bhavesh Patel as Bobby Owens
- Patrick Duggan as Waldorf-Astoria Doorman
- Craig T. Nelson as Kenny Wells, Kenny's father.
- Danny Winn as the Angry Investor
- Jackamoe Buzzell as Kay's Boss - American Home
- Jirayu Tantrakul as Darmadi 'Danny' Suharto
- Ed Trucco as Bartender

== Production ==
=== Development ===
The project was first announced by Deadline on April 12, 2011, as a treasure hunt film titled Gold in the vein of The Treasure of the Sierra Madre, written by Patrick Massett and John Zinman as a writing sample and developed by Paul Haggis, who showed it to Michael Mann. Mann liked the script and joined as director and producer for his banner Forward Pass, which Haggis would also produce along with Michael Nozik. Later in August 2011, Variety reported that Christian Bale was being eyed for the lead role, and it was one of several projects he had to choose among at the time.

In March 2012, Mann exited the project due to his involvement in the development of the film Big Tuna and an untitled cyber thriller film (later titled Blackhat). On October 17, 2012, Black Bear Pictures came on board to fully finance and produce the film. Black Bear's Teddy Schwarzman and Ben Stillman would produce the film along with Haggis and Nozik through their Hwy61, and Massett and Zinman would also produce the film.

On May 16, 2013, TheWrap reported that Spike Lee replaced Mann to direct the film when Mann left to start production on his untitled cyber thriller film that was eventually titled Blackhat.

On August 22, 2014, Deadline confirmed that Matthew McConaughey would be next starring in the film Gold.

On January 28, 2015, it was announced that the film would be directed by Stephen Gaghan, replacing Lee, and it would be shot in June 2015 in New York City, New Mexico and Thailand, while the film's foreign sales would be handled by Sierra/Affinity. Producers would be Schwarzman and Nozik, along with Massett, Zinman and McConaughey, while Haggis would executive-produce along with Richard Middleton. On February 12, 2015, Sierra/Affinity sold the film to international distributors at European Film Market in Berlin. Édgar Ramírez was added to the cast on March 18, 2015, to play the role of geologist Michael Acosta. On March 30, 2015, The Weinstein Company acquired the film's US distribution rights for $15 million, and the film would release domestically through TWC-Dimension. On May 15, 2015, Michelle Williams was set to star alongside McConaughey, to play his character's wife. Joshua Harto signed-on on June 3, 2015, to play Lloyd Stanton, the businessman's bank account manager. Timothy Simons was added to the cast on June 12, 2015, to play a Wall Street banker who is coaxed by the duo to inspect the potential value of the company in the jungles of Borneo. Michael Landes also signed-on on June 29, 2015, to star in the film. On August 28, 2015, Bryce Dallas Howard was confirmed to cast in the film for the female lead role of Kay, Wells' longtime girlfriend, replacing Michelle Williams. The other cast added included Corey Stoll, Toby Kebbell, Bruce Greenwood, and Stacy Keach. Daniel Pemberton composed the film's score.

=== Filming ===
Principal photography on the film began on June 29, 2015, in Thailand. From mid-August to mid-September, the film shot in the Albuquerque, New Mexico area, before moving on to Reno, Nevada for exterior scenes. Early October, filming began in New York City in Manhattan.

== Release ==
Originally scheduled to open wide on December 25, 2016, it was pushed back to opening wide on January 27, with the December 25 release staying a limited release in order to qualify for awards. The film's limited release was then pushed back to December 30, 2016, four days after its presumed date. The Weinstein Company agreed to spend $20 million on marketing the film.

== Reception ==
=== Box office ===
It grossed $7.2 million in the United States and Canada and $7.6 million in other territories for a worldwide gross of $14.8 million, against 20 million dollars budget.

In the United States and Canada, Gold was released alongside A Dog's Purpose and Resident Evil: The Final Chapter, and was projected to gross around $3 million from 2,166 theaters in its opening weekend. It ended up grossing $3.5 million, finishing 10th at the box office. The film dropped 60% in its second weekend, grossing $1.4 million and finishing 14th at the box office.

=== Critical response ===
On review aggregation website Rotten Tomatoes the film holds an approval rating of 42% based on 187 reviews, with an average rating of 5.23/10. The site's critical consensus reads, "Gold boasts an impressively committed performance from Matthew McConaughey, but it's just one glittering nugget in an otherwise uneven heap of cinematic silt." On Metacritic, the film holds a rating of 49 out of 100, based on 40 critics, indicating "mixed or average" reviews. Audiences polled by CinemaScore gave the film an average grade of "B−" on an A+ to F scale, while PostTrak reported filmgoers gave the film a 67% overall positive score.

=== Accolades ===
Year	Award	Category	Recipient(s)	Result	Ref(s)
2016	20th Hollywood Film Awards	Hollywood Ensemble Award	Bryce Dallas Howard, Stacy Keach, Matthew McConaughey, and Édgar Ramírez	Won	
2017	74th Golden Globe Awards	Best Original Song	"Gold"; Stephen Gaghan, Danger Mouse, Daniel Pemberton, and Iggy Pop	Nominated	
2017	43rd Saturn Awards	Best Action or Adventure Film	Gold	Nominated	
2017	43rd Saturn Awards	Best Actor	Matthew McConaughey	Nominated	
2017	43rd Saturn Awards	Best Supporting Actress	Bryce Dallas Howard	Nominated	

== Music ==
Below is the track listing to the soundtrack for the film:

Track listing
No.	Title	Performed by	Length
1.	"Gold"	Iggy Pop	3:14
2.	"Ron Klaus Wrecked His House"	Big Dipper	5:06
3.	"This Must Be the Place (Naive Melody)"	Kishi Bashi	3:28
4.	"Spill The Wine"	The Isley Brothers	6:32
5.	"I Want To See The Bright Lights Tonight"	Richard & Linda Thompson	3:09
6.	"Rip It Up"	Orange Juice	5:21
7.	"Blue Monday"	New Order	7:00
8.	"Temptation"	New Order	6:59
9.	"Hey"	Pixies	3:32
10.	"Atmosphere"	Joy Division	4:10
11.	"1880 Or So (Clean)"	Television	3:39
