= Natural resource =

Resources that exist without actions of humankind

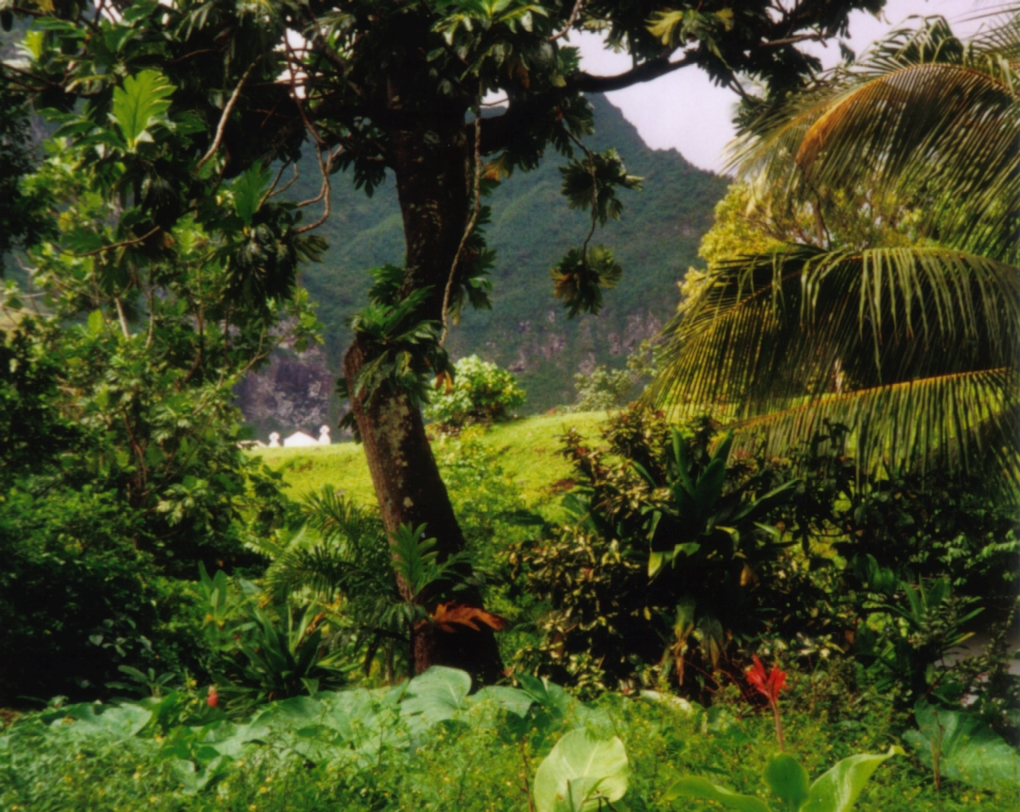
The rainforest in Amazon, in the Marquesas Islands, is an example of an undisturbed natural resource. The forest provides timber for humans, food, water and shelter for the flora and fauna tribes and animals. The nutrient cycle between organisms forms food chains and fosters a biodiversity of species.

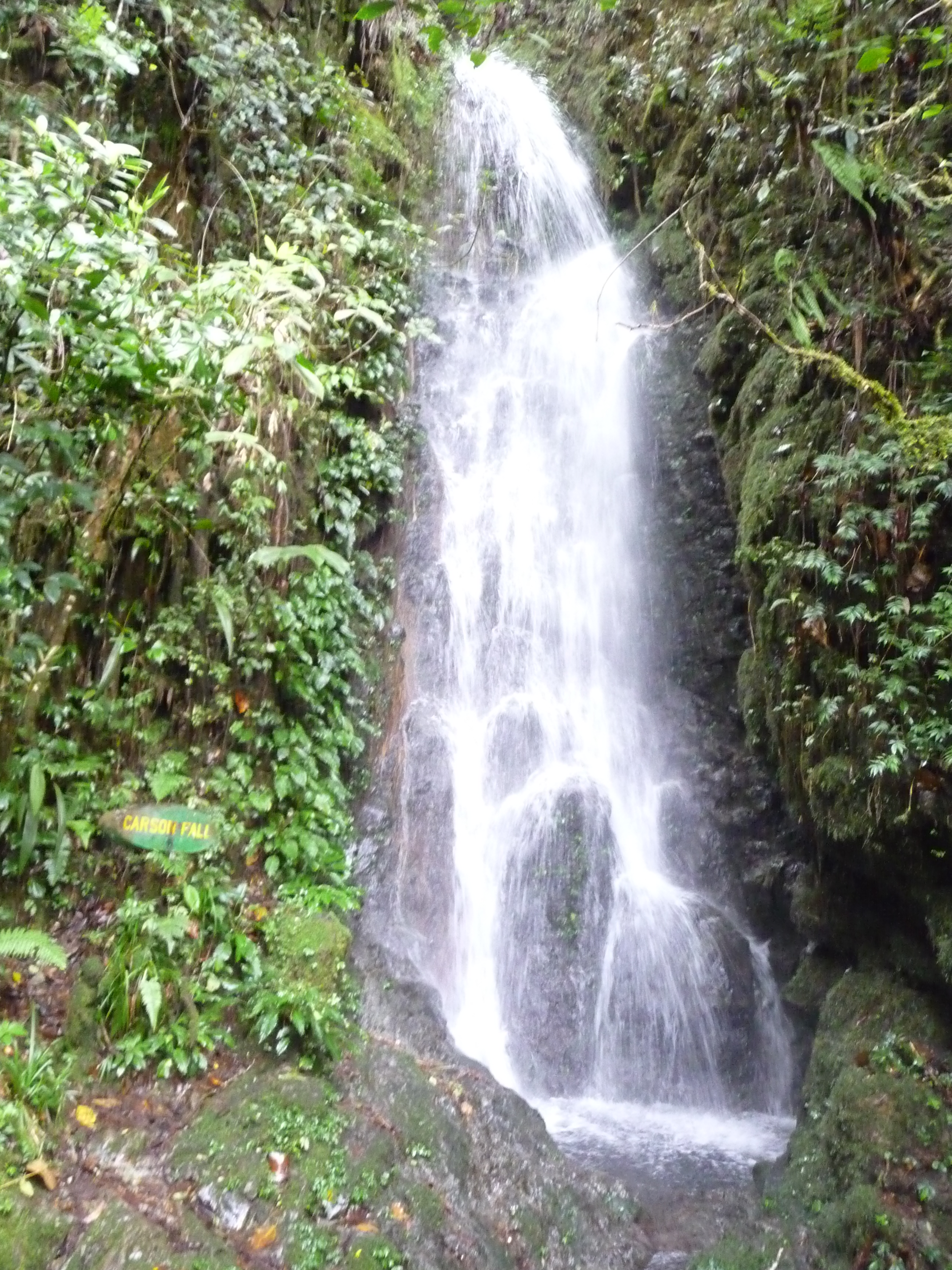
The Carson Fall in Mount Kinabalu, Malaysia is an example of undisturbed natural resources. Waterfalls provide spring water for humans, animals and plants for survival and habitat for marine organisms. The water current can be used to turn turbines for hydroelectric generation.

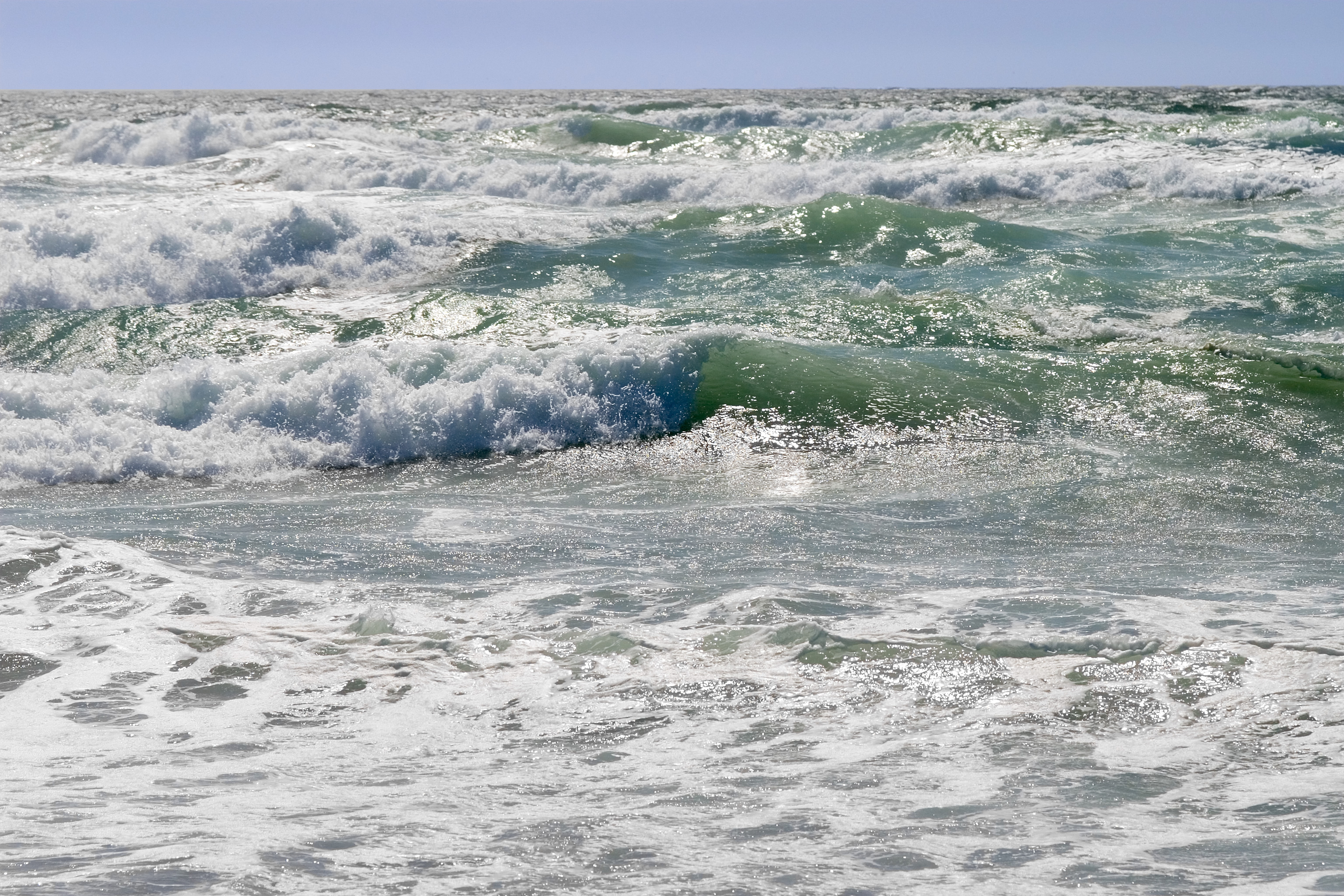
The ocean is an example of a natural resource. Ocean waves can be used to generate wave power, a renewable energy source. Ocean water is important for salt production, desalination, and providing habitat for deep-water fishes. There is biodiversity of marine species in the sea where nutrient cycles are common.

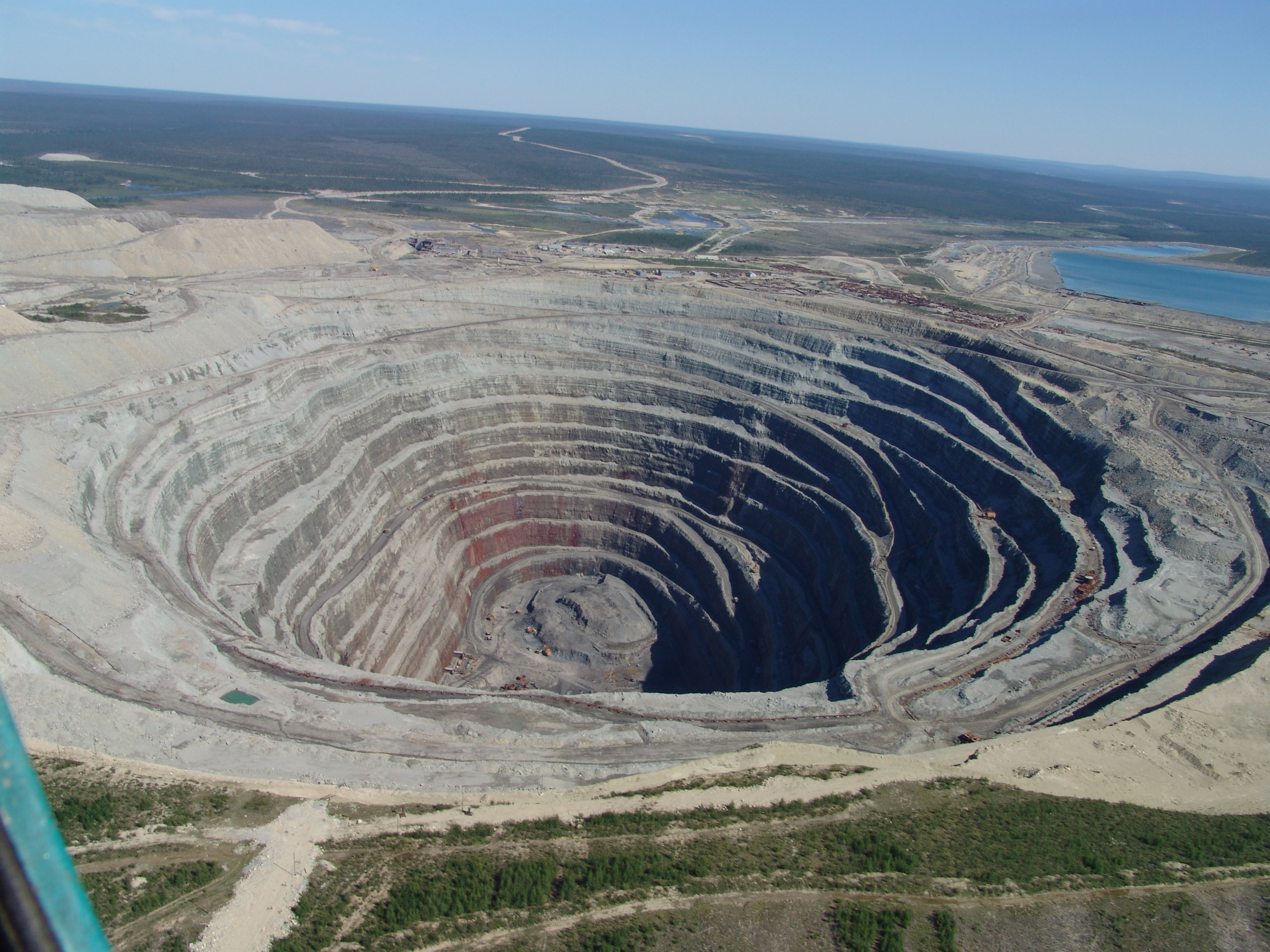
A picture of the Udachnaya pipe, an open-pit diamond mine in Siberia. An example of a non-renewable natural resource.

Natural resources are resources that are drawn from nature and used with few modifications. This includes the sources of valued characteristics such as commercial and industrial use, aesthetic value, scientific interest, and cultural value. On Earth, it includes sunlight, atmosphere, water, land, all minerals, along with all vegetation, and wildlife.

Natural resources are part of humanity's natural heritage or protected in nature reserves. Particular areas (such as the rainforest in Fatu-Hiva) often feature biodiversity and geodiversity in their ecosystems. Natural resources may be classified in different ways. Natural resources are materials and components (something that can be used) found within the environment. Every man-made product is composed of natural resources (at its fundamental level).

A natural resource may exist as a separate entity, such as freshwater, air, or any living organism, such as a fish, or it may be transformed by extractivist industries into an economically useful form that must be processed to obtain the resource, such as metal ores, rare-earth elements, petroleum, timber, and most forms of energy. Some resources are renewable, which means that they can be used at a certain rate, and natural processes will restore them. In contrast, many extractive industries rely heavily on non-renewable resources that can only be extracted once.

Natural resource allocations can be at the centre of many economic and political confrontations both within and between countries. This is particularly true during periods of increasing scarcity and shortages (depletion and overconsumption of resources). Resource extraction is also a major source of human rights violations and environmental damage. The Sustainable Development Goals and other international development agendas frequently focus on creating more sustainable resource extraction, with some scholars and researchers focused on creating economic models, such as circular economy, that rely less on resource extraction, and more on reuse, recycling and renewable resources that can be sustainably managed.

== Classification ==
There are various criteria for classifying natural resources. These include the source of origin, stages of development, renewability, and ownership.

=== Origin ===
- Biotic: Resources that originate from the biosphere and have life, such as flora and fauna, fisheries, livestock, etc. Fossil fuels such as coal and petroleum are also included in this category because they are formed from decayed organic matter.
- Abiotic: Resources that originate from non-living and inorganic material. These include land, water, air, rare-earth elements, and heavy metals, including ores, such as gold, iron, copper, silver, etc.

=== Stage of development ===
- Potential resources: Resources that are known to exist but have not been utilized yet. These may be used in the future. For example, petroleum in sedimentary rocks that, until extracted and put to use, remains a potential resource.
- Actual resources: Resources that have been surveyed, quantified, and qualified and are currently used in development. These are typically dependent on technology and the level of their feasibility, wood processing for example.
- Reserves: The part of an actual resource that can be developed profitably in the future.
- Stocks: Resources that have been surveyed but cannot be used due to lack of technology, hydrogen vehicles for example.

=== Renewability/exhaustibility ===
- Renewable resources: These resources can be replenished naturally. Some of these resources, like solar energy, air, wind, water, etc., are continuously available, and their quantities are not noticeably affected by human consumption. Though many renewable resources do not have such a rapid recovery rate, these resources are susceptible to depletion by overuse. Resources from a human use perspective are classified as renewable so long as the rate of replenishment/recovery exceeds that of the rate of consumption. Renewable resources replenish easily when compared to non-renewable resources.

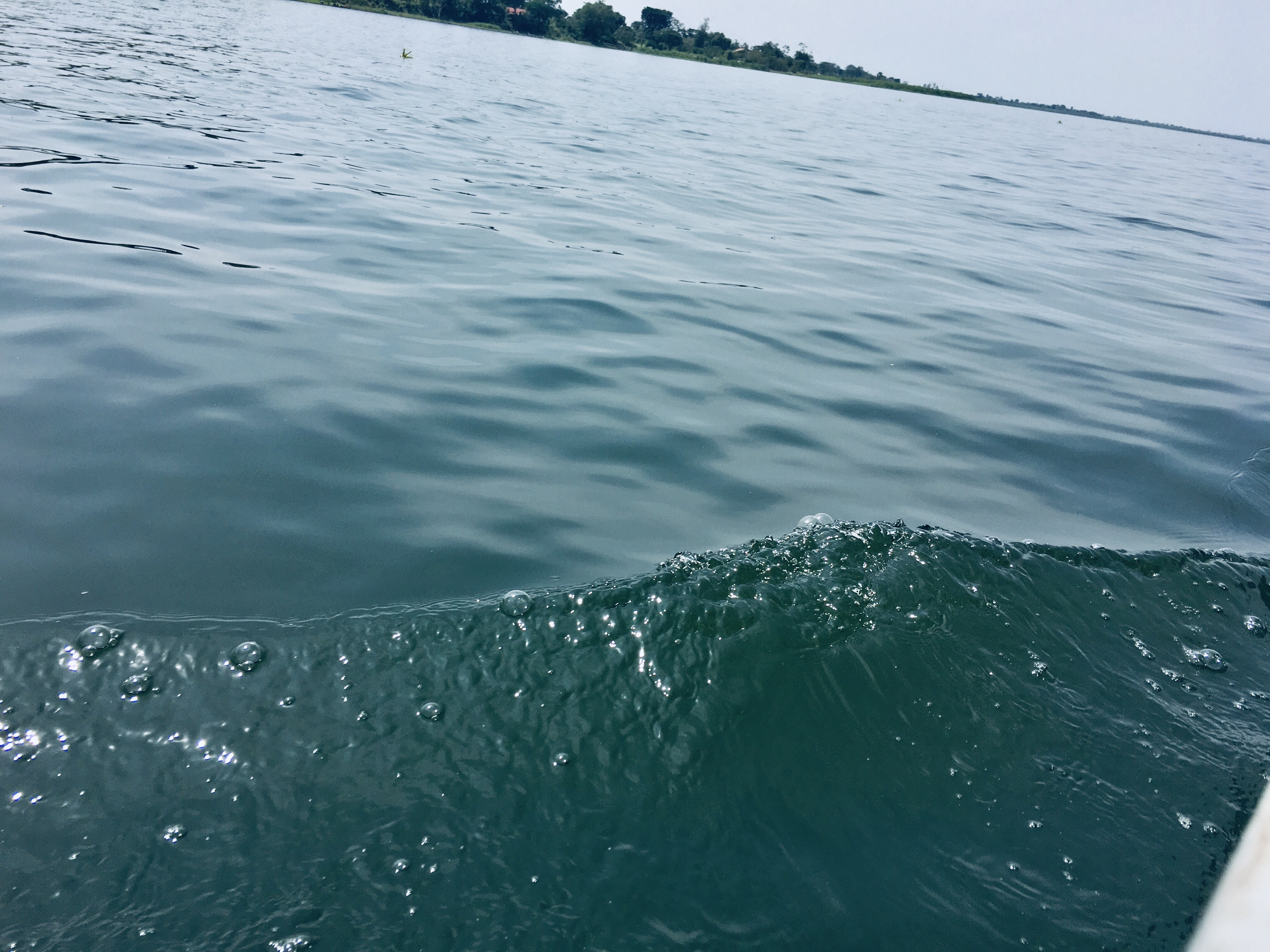
The waters of the White Nile River are a key natural resource for Uganda.

- Non-renewable resources: These resources are formed over a long geological time period in the environment and cannot be renewed easily. Minerals are the most common resource included in this category. From the human perspective, resources are non-renewable when their rate of consumption exceeds the rate of replenishment/recovery; a good example of this is fossil fuels, which are in this category because their rate of formation is extremely slow (potentially millions of years), meaning they are considered non-renewable. Some resources naturally deplete in amount without human interference, the most notable of these being radioactive elements such as uranium, which naturally decay into heavy metals. Of these, the metallic minerals can be reused by recycling them, but coal and petroleum cannot be recycled.

=== Ownership ===
- Individual resources: Resources owned privately by individuals. These include plots, houses, plantations, pastures, ponds, etc.
- Community resources: Resources that are accessible to all the members of a community, e.g., cemeteries.
- National resources: Resources that belong to the nation. The nation has legal powers to acquire them for public welfare. These also include minerals, forests and wildlife within the political boundaries and Exclusive economic zone.
- International resources: These resources are regulated by international organizations, e.g.: International waters.

== Extraction ==
Resource extraction involves any activity that withdraws resources from nature. This can range in scale from the traditional use of preindustrial societies to global industry. Extractive industries are, along with agriculture, the basis of the primary sector of the economy. Extraction produces raw material, which is then processed to add value. Examples of extractive industries are hunting, trapping, mining, oil and gas drilling, and forestry. Natural resources can be a substantial part of a country's wealth; however, a sudden inflow of money caused by a resource extraction boom can create social problems, including inflation harming other industries ("Dutch disease") and corruption, leading to inequality and underdevelopment. This is known as the "resource curse".

Extractive industries represent a large growing activity in many less-developed countries, but the wealth generated does not always lead to sustainable and inclusive growth. People often accuse extractive industry businesses of acting only to maximize short-term value, implying that less-developed countries are vulnerable to powerful corporations. Alternatively, host governments are often assumed to be only maximizing immediate revenue. Researchers argue there are areas of common interest where development goals and business cross. These present opportunities for international governmental agencies to engage with the private sector and host governments through revenue management and expenditure accountability, infrastructure development, employment creation, skills and enterprise development, and impacts on children, especially girls and women. A strong civil society can play an important role in ensuring the effective management of natural resources. Norway can serve as a role model in this regard, as it has good institutions and open and dynamic public debate with strong civil society actors that provide an effective checks and balances system for the government's management of extractive industries, such as the Extractive Industries Transparency Initiative (EITI), a global standard for the good governance of oil, gas, and mineral resources. It seeks to address the key governance issues in the extractive sectors. However, in countries that do not have a very strong and unified society, meaning that there are dissidents who are not as happy with the government as in Norway's case, natural resources can actually be a factor in whether a civil war starts and how long the war lasts.

== Depletion ==
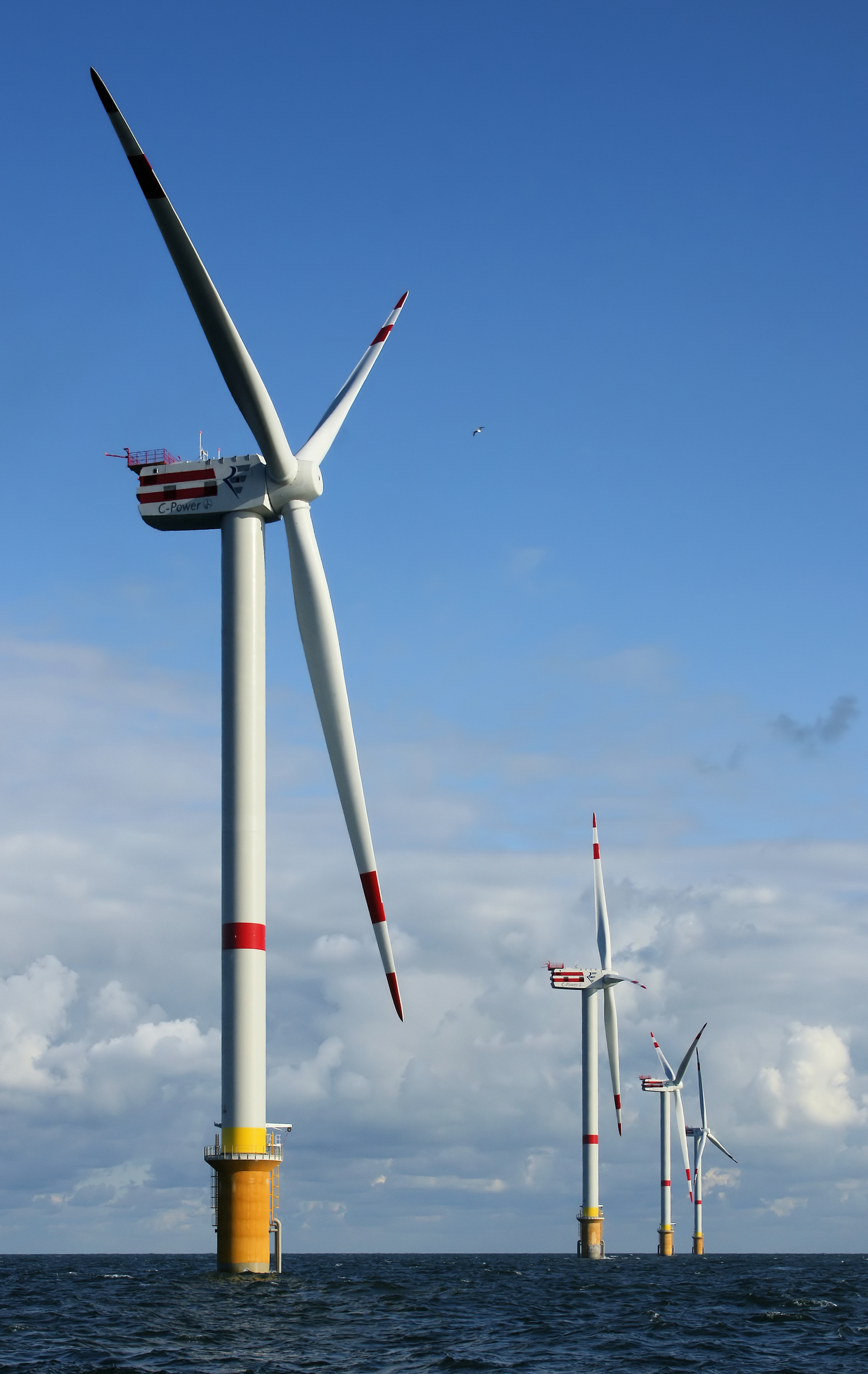
Wind is a natural resource that can be used to generate electricity, as with these 5 MW wind turbines in Thorntonbank Wind Farm 28 km (17 mi) off the coast of Belgium.

Recently, the depletion of natural resources has become a major focus of governments and organizations such as the United Nations (UN). This is evident in the UN's Agenda 21 Section Two, which outlines the necessary steps for countries to take to sustain their natural resources. The depletion of natural resources is considered a sustainable development issue. The term 'sustainable development' has many interpretations, most notably the Brundtland Commission's'to ensure that it meets the needs of the present without compromising the ability of future generations to meet their own needs'; however, in broad terms, it is balancing the needs of the planet's people and species now and in the future. In regard to natural resources, depletion is of concern for sustainable development as it has the ability to degrade current environments and the potential to impact the needs of future generations.

Depletion of natural resources is associated with social inequity. Considering most biodiversity is located in developing countries, depletion of this resource could result in losses of ecosystem services for these countries. Some view this depletion as a major source of social unrest and conflicts in developing nations.

At present, there is a particular concern for rainforest regions that hold most of the Earth's biodiversity. According to Nelson, deforestation and degradation affect 8.5% of the world's forests with 30% of the Earth's surface already cropped. If we consider that 80% of people rely on medicines obtained from plants and 3/4 of the world's prescription medicines have ingredients taken from plants, loss of the world's rainforests could result in a loss of finding more potential life-saving medicines.

The depletion of natural resources is caused by "direct drivers of change" such as mining, petroleum extraction, fishing, and forestry, as well as "indirect drivers of change", such as demography (e.g., population growth), economy, society, politics, and technology. The current practice of agriculture is another factor causing depletion of natural resources. For example, the depletion of nutrients in the soil due to excessive use of nitrogen and desertification. The depletion of natural resources is a continuing concern for society.

== Protection ==
In 1982, the United Nations developed the World Charter for Nature, which recognized the need to protect nature from further depletion due to human activity. All societal levels, from international to individual, must implement measures to safeguard nature. It outlines the need for sustainable use of natural resources and suggests that the protection of resources should be incorporated into national and international systems of law. To look at the importance of protecting natural resources further, the World Ethic of Sustainability, developed by the IUCN, WWF and the UNEP in 1990, set out eight values for sustainability, including the need to protect natural resources from depletion. Since the development of these documents, many measures have been taken to protect natural resources, including the establishment of the scientific field and the practice of conservation biology and habitat conservation, respectively.

Conservation biology is the scientific study of the nature and status of Earth's biodiversity with the aim of protecting species, their habitats, and ecosystems from excessive rates of extinction. It is an interdisciplinary subject drawing on science, economics, and the practice of natural resource management. The term "conservation biology" was introduced as the title of a conference held at the University of California, San Diego, in La Jolla, California, in 1978, organized by biologists Bruce A. Wilcox and Michael E. Soulé.

Habitat conservation is a type of land management that seeks to conserve, protect and restore habitat areas for wild plants and animals, especially conservation-reliant species, and prevent their extinction, fragmentation or reduction in range.

== Management ==
Natural resource management is a discipline in the management of natural resources such as land, water, soil, plants, and animals—with a particular focus on how management affects quality of life for present and future generations. Hence, sustainable development is followed according to the judicious use of resources to supply present and future generations. The disciplines of fisheries, forestry, and wildlife are examples of large subdisciplines of natural resource management.

Management of natural resources involves identifying who has the right to use the resources and who does not to define the management boundaries of the resource. The resources may be managed by the users according to the rules governing when and how the resource is used depending on local condition or the resources may be managed by a governmental organization or other central authority.

A "...successful management of natural resources depends on freedom of speech, a dynamic and wide-ranging public debate through multiple independent media channels and an active civil society engaged in natural resource issues..." because of the nature of the shared resources, the individuals who are affected by the rules can participate in setting or changing them. The users have rights to devise their own management institutions and plans under the recognition by the government. The right to resources includes land, water, fisheries, and pastoral rights. The users or parties accountable to the users have to actively monitor and ensure the utilisation of the resource in compliance with the rules and impose penalties on those people who violate the rules. These conflicts are resolved quickly and efficiently by the local institution according to the seriousness and context of the offense. The global science-based platform to discuss natural resources management is the World Resources Forum, based in Switzerland.

== See also ==
- Asteroid mining
- Citizen's dividend
- Conservation (ethic)
- Cultural resources
- Environmental movement
- Land (economics)
- Lunar resources
- Mining
- Nature-based solutions
- Resource nationalism
- Sustainable development
- United Nations Framework Classification for Resources
- United Nations Resource Management System
