= Critical Raw Materials Act =

European Union legislation

The Critical Raw Materials Act (CRM Act) is a regulation by the European Union (EU) which aims to secure supply of critical raw materials to EU member states. The CRM Act primarily focuses on the expansion of the EU's domestic capacities to extract, process, and recycle raw materials. It has entered into force on 23 May 2024.

Since 2011, the European Commission has triennially assessed a list of Critical Raw Materials (CRMs), with 14 CRMs identified in 2011, 20 in 2014, 27 in 2017, 30 in 2020 and 34 in 2023. These materials are mainly used in energy transition and digital technologies. Then, in March 2023, Commission President Ursula von der Leyen proposed the Critical Raw Materials Act, "for a regulation of the European Parliament and of the European Council establishing a framework for ensuring a secure and sustainable supply of critical raw materials". At the time, Europe depended on China for 98% of its rare-earth needs, 97% of its lithium supply and 93% of its magnesium supply.

== Definition ==
According to the Intergovernmental Forum on Mining, Minerals, Metals and Sustainable Development (IGF), criticality has no agreed definition, varies with time, and is specific to country and context. Critical materials have been defined by one academic group as "raw materials for which there are no viable substitutes with current technologies, which most consumer countries are dependent on importing, and whose supply is dominated by one or a few producers".

== European strategy pre-2023 ==
According to the United Nations in 2011, as the demand for rare metals will quickly exceed the consumed tonnage in 2013, it is urgent and priority should be placed on recycling rare metals with a worldwide production lower than 100 000 t/year, in order to conserve natural resources and energy. However, this measure will not be enough. Planned obsolescence of products which contain these metals should be limited, and all elements inside computers, mobile phones or other electronic objects found in electronic waste should be recycled. This involves looking for eco-designed alternatives, and changes in consumer behavior in favor of selective sorting aimed at an almost total recycling of these metals.

Europe alone produced about 12 million tons of metallic wastes in 2012, and this amount tended to grow more than 4% a year (faster than municipal waste). However, fewer than 20 metals, of the 60 studied by experts of the UNEP, were recycled to more than 50% in the world. 34 compounds were recycled at lower than 1% of the total discarded as trash.

According to the UNEP, even without new technologies, that rate could be greatly increased. The energy efficiency of the production and recycling methods has also to be developed.

Information about the location of deposits of rare metals is scarce. In 2013, the US DOE created the Critical Materials Institute, whose intended role was to focus on finding and commercializing ways to reduce reliance on the critical materials essential for American competitiveness in the clean energy technologies.

On 3 September 2020, the European Commission presented its strategy to both strengthen and better control its supply of some thirty materials deemed critical, in particular rare earths. The list includes, for example:

- graphite, lithium and cobalt, used in the manufacture of electric batteries;
- silicon, an essential component of solar panels;
- rare earths used for magnets,
- conductive seeds and electronic components.

Where European resources are insufficient, the Commission promises to strengthen long-term partnerships, notably with Canada, Africa and Australia.

== Issues ==
There are many issues about these resources and they concern a large number of people and human activities. It is possible to distinguish:

- Economic: the price of metals increases when their scarcity or inaccessibility increases, and not only according to demand for them. As part of transition management, the circular economy invites citizens to recycle these resources as well as to save them and/or to replace them with alternatives when it is possible.
- Geostrategic: These rare products are necessary for computer and other communications equipment and can themselves be the subject of armed conflict or simply provide armed conflict with a source of funding. Both coltan and blood diamonds have been examples of the resource curse that plagues some parts of Africa.
- Social: Increasing globalization and mobility of people, means that telecoms and social networks depend more and more on the availability of these resources.
- Health: Several critical metals or minerals are toxic or reprotoxic. Paradoxically, some cytotoxins are used in cancer therapy, and then improperly discarded though very dangerous for the environment; the average cost of the treatment of a lung cancer varied between 20,000 and 27,000 euros as of 2004. Thus, toxic and cancer-causing platinum is also widely used in cancer chemotherapy in the form of carboplatin and cisplatin, both cytotoxins combined with other molecules, including for example gemcitabine (GEM), vinorelbine (VIN), docetaxel (DOC), and paclitaxel (PAC).
- Energy: Production of these metals and their compounds requires a significant and increasing amount of energy, and when they become rarer, it is necessary to search deeper for them, and the further mineral recovered is sometimes less condensed than previous production had been. In 2012, from 7 to 8% of all the energy used in the world was used to extract these minerals. The magnets in electrical motors, or wind and water turbines, as well as some components of solar panels also need many of these same minerals or rare metals.

== The Act ==
The Call for evidence preliminary to the Act was made in autumn 2022. The Act "identifies a list of strategic raw materials, which are crucial to technologies important to Europe's green and digital ambitions and for defence and space applications, while being subject to potential supply risks in the future." By 2030, one single ex-EU country shall produce not more than 65% of the EU's annual consumption of each strategic raw material. Clear benchmarks have been set for domestic capacities of the EU, which will by 2030:

- extract at least 10% of the EU's annual consumption;
- process at least 40% of the EU's annual consumption;
- recycle at least 25% of the EU's annual consumption.

The Act will "reduce the administrative burden and simplify permitting procedures for critical raw materials projects in the EU. In addition, selected Strategic Projects will benefit from support for access to finance and shorter permitting timeframes (24 months for extraction permits and 12 months for processing and recycling permits). Member States will also have to develop national programmes for exploring geological resources."

The document acknowledges that the EU "will never be self-sufficient in supplying such raw materials and will continue to rely on imports for a majority of its consumption. International trade is therefore essential to supporting global production and ensuring diversification of supply. The EU will need to strengthen its global engagement with reliable partners to develop and diversify investment and promote stability in international trade and strengthen legal certainty for investors. In particular, the EU will seek mutually beneficial partnerships with emerging markets and developing economies, notably in the framework of its Global Gateway strategy."

In late 2026 a number of proposals went forward to augment the CRM Act.

== European lists of critical raw materials ==
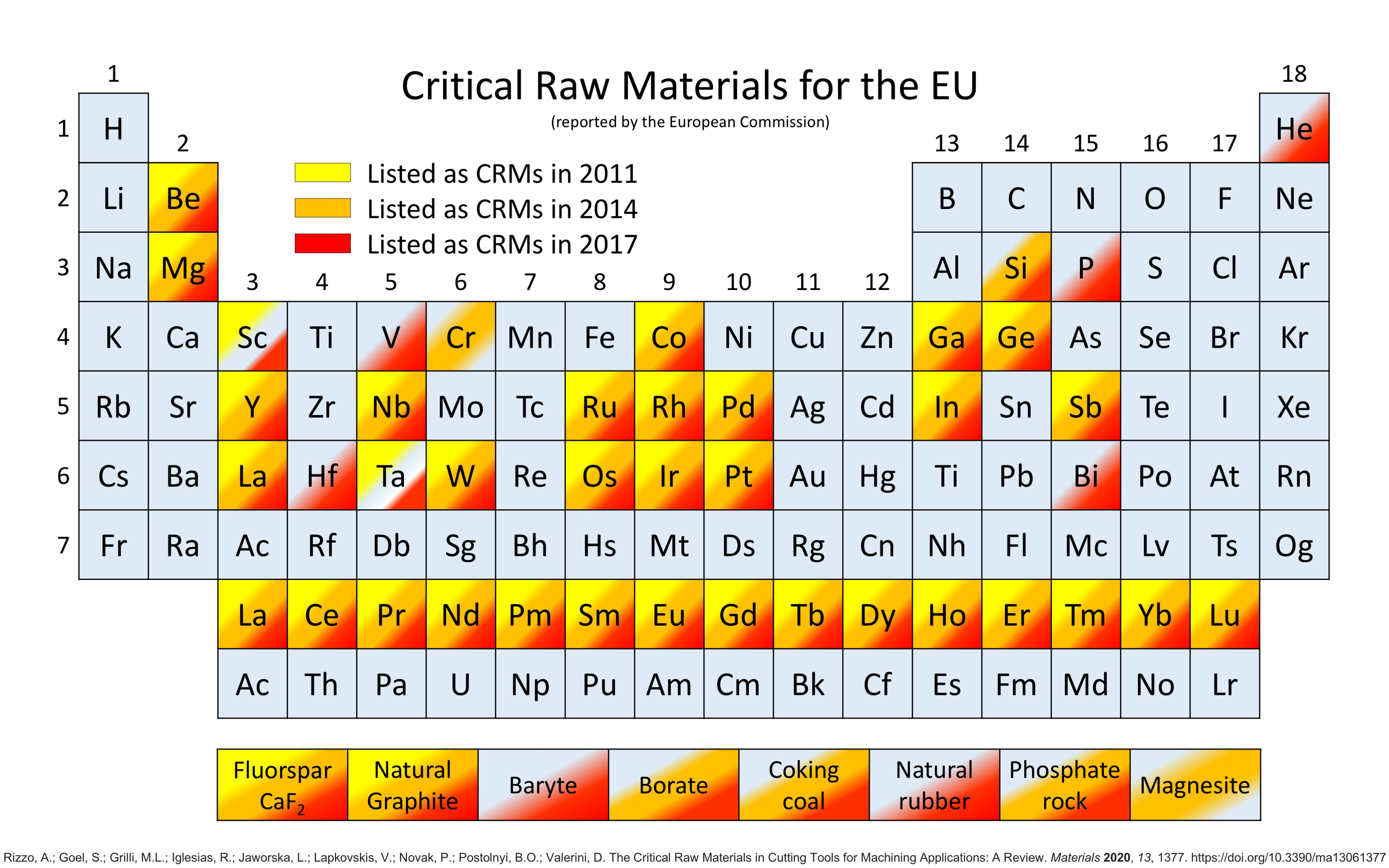
Figure gives a summary of critical raw materials lists reported by the European Commission in 2011, 2014 and 2017.

All critical raw materials are graphically summarised on the periodic table of elements published in the 2020 review paper "The Critical Raw Materials in Cutting Tools for Machining Applications: A Review". The list was updated in March 2023.

They are also shown in the table below.

2011	2014	2017	2020	2023
.	.	.	.	Aluminium
Antimony	Antimony	Antimony	Antimony	Antimony
.	.	.	.	Arsenic
.	.	.	Bauxite	Bauxite
.	.	Baryte	Baryte	Baryte
Beryllium	Beryllium	Beryllium	Beryllium	Beryllium
.	.	Bismuth	Bismuth	Bismuth
.	Borate	Borate	Borate	Borate
.	.	.	.	Boron
.	Chromium	.	.	.
Cobalt	Cobalt	Cobalt	Cobalt	Cobalt
.	.	.	.	Copper
.	Coking coal	Coking coal	Coking coal	Coking coal
.	.	.	.	Feldspar
Fluorspar	Fluorspar	Fluorspar	Fluorspar	Fluorspar
Gallium	Gallium	Gallium	Gallium	Gallium
Germanium	Germanium	Germanium	Germanium	Germanium
Graphite	Graphite	Graphite	Graphite	Graphite
.	.	Hafnium	Hafnium	Hafnium
.	.	Helium	.	Helium
Indium	Indium	Indium	Indium	Indium
.	.	.	Lithium	Lithium
.	Magnesite	.	.	.
Magnesium	Magnesium	Magnesium	Magnesium	Magnesium
.	.	.	.	Manganese
.	.	Natural rubber	Natural rubber	.
.	.	.	.	Nickel
Niobium	Niobium	Niobium	Niobium	Niobium
Platinum-group metals	Platinum group metals	Platinum group metals	Platinum group metals	Platinum group metals
.	Phosphate rock	Phosphate rock	Phosphate rock	Phosphate rock
.	.	Phosphorus	Phosphorus	Phosphorus
Scandium	.	Scandium	Scandium	Scandium
.	Silicon	Silicon	Silicon	Silicon
.	.	.	Strontium	Strontium
Tantalum	.	Tantalum	Tantalum	Tantalum
.	.	.	Titanium	Titanium
Rare-earth elements	Light rare earth	Light rare earth	Light rare earth	Light rare earth
Rare-earth elements	Heavy rare earth	Heavy rare earth	Heavy rare earth	Heavy rare earth
Tungsten	Tungsten	Tungsten	Tungsten	Tungsten
.	.	Vanadium	Vanadium	Vanadium

== See also ==
- Conflict resource
- Françafrique
- Kimberly process
- Petroleum politics
- Quad Critical Minerals Initiative Framework
- Strategic material
- United Nations Framework Classification for Resources
- United Nations Resource Management System
