= National instrument =

The term national instrument can refer to:

- National instrument (music), of particular cultural and social importance
- National Instrument 43-101, a national instrument for the Standards of Disclosure for Mineral Projects within Canada
- National Instruments, an American corporation
- National String Instrument Corporation, a defunct manufacturer of musical instruments
