= Quantitative mineral-resource assessments =

Quantitative mineral-resource assessments are defined as the numerical estimate of the amount, quality, and in some cases, value of undiscovered minerals (that is, metal or industrial mineral) present within a specified area (tract). Their purpose is to provide a framework for making decisions by governments or institutions concerning mineral resources under conditions of uncertainty. Due to the uncertainty inherent in assessment of unknown resources, the results are presented probabilistically. The resources are in undiscovered mineral deposits whose existence is postulated based on indirect geologic evidence. The mineral deposits are believed to exist within a specified distance from the surface of the ground, or an incompletely explored mineral occurrence or prospect that could have sufficient size and grade to be classed a deposit. A mineral concentration of sufficient size and grade richness that it might, under the most favorable of circumstances, be considered to have potential for economic development is a mineral deposit (Ore).

== Basis for making estimates ==
A key to the development of modern resource assessments was recognition that differences in locations, amounts, and qualities can be captured by knowing about different kinds of mineral deposits that contain the resources of interest. The large uncertainties inherent in estimating amounts of undiscovered non-renewable resources in an area of interest are significantly reduced by knowing if a deposit type (Mineral resource classification) could occur. Different kinds of mineral deposits occur in different geologic settings. The linkage between deposit types and geology is provided by mineral deposit models.3.

== Mineral deposit models ==
A descriptive mineral deposit model is set of data in a convenient form that describes a group of mineral deposits having similar characteristics. The model identifies the geologic environments in which the deposit type could be found and gives identifying characteristics of the type.

A grade and tonnage model consists of the frequency distributions and relationships of the grades and sizes of completely explored individual mineral deposits of a given type. These models document how commonly different grades and tonnages occur by deposit type.

Mineral deposit density models start with the areas of well-explored control tracts where the number of deposits that are consistent with the grade-and-tonnage model are used. The resulting frequency distributions serve as analogs for estimation of the number of undiscovered deposits in other tracts.

== Quantitative assessments ==
An integrated approach to mineral resource assessment uses three assessment parts and the models that support them. The first part uses models of tonnages and grades to estimate possible tonnages and grades of undiscovered deposits. The second part develops mineral resource maps that answer the question, does an area's geology permit the existence of one or more types of mineral deposits? The product of this part of the assessment is identification of so-called permissive tracts of land and is based on mapped geology in the region and descriptive models. For those areas that are permissive for a deposit type, the third part of the assessment develops estimates of the possible number of undiscovered deposits of each type based on deposit density models or expert judgment. These estimated undiscovered deposits are consistent with the grade and tonnage models of the first part and with documented deposit densities. This so-called three-part form of quantitative mineral resource assessments has been widely used. Among the places where they have been applied are the United States, Venezuela, parts of Canada, South America, Australia, Finland, and the Urals as part of a global assessment [10].

== See also ==
- Uncertainty
- Mineral resource classification
- Ore
