= National Instrument 43-101 =

Canadian regulatory instrument governing mining disclosures

National Instrument 43-101 Standards of Disclosure for Mineral Projects ("NI 43-101") is a securities regulatory instrument that governs how companies can disclose mining-related information in Canada. Its rules aim to prevent companies from sharing inaccurate or misleading information about their mineral assets with prospective investors and the public. It is overseen and enforced by the Canadian Securities Administrators.

NI 43-101 applies broadly to companies both public and private, and to a variety of disclosures types including mineral exploration reports, reporting of resources and reserves, presentations, oral comments, and websites. NI 43-101 covers mineral products such, precious metals and solid energy commodities as well as bulk minerals, dimension stone, precious stones and mineral sands commodities.

National Instrument 43-101 is comparable to the Joint Ore Reserves Committee Code (JORC Code) which regulates the publication of mineral exploration reports on the Australian Securities Exchange (ASX). It is also broadly comparable with the South African Code for the Reporting of Mineral Resources and Mineral Reserves (SAMREC). The reporting codes are, however, not entirely congruent in practice, in that NI 43-101 is more prescriptive in terms of the manner in which mineral exploration reporting is presented, although the content of the technical reports, and the scientific rigors to which the mineral resource classifications within them are put, are often very similar.

For TSX listing purposes, an NI 43-101 Technical Report would have to be accompanied by a Report prepared in accordance with NI 43-101. For ASX listings, a JORC Mineral Resource Statement needs to be accompanied by a Valmin Valuation Report, while for JSE listings, a Competent Person's Report (CPRs), which is compliant with SAMREC and The South African Code for the Valuation of Mineral Assets (SAMVAL), needs to be submitted.

In many cases, NI 43-101 and JORC Code technical reports are considered inter-changeable and may be accepted by either regulatory body in cases of dual listed entities and, indeed, are accepted as the de facto industry reporting standard by many other jurisdictions which lack similar rigorous reporting standards or internationally recognized industry professional bodies. The LSE, for instance, accepts CPRs, Qualified Person's Reports (QPRs), and Mineral Resource Statements, compiled using JORC, SAMREC and SAMVAL, or NI 43-101, when accompanied by a NI51-101 Valuation Form, for listing on the LSE. Likewise, the Hong Kong Stock Exchange accepts reports prepared in accordance with NI 43-101, SAMREC or JORC.

== Purpose ==
The purpose of National Instrument 43-101 is to ensure that misleading, erroneous or fraudulent information relating to mineral properties is not published and promoted to investors on the stock exchanges overseen by the Canadian Securities Administrators.

NI 43-101 was created after the Bre-X scandal to protect investors from unsubstantiated mineral project disclosures.

"The gold reserves at (Bre-X's) Busang were alleged to be 200 million ounces (6,200 t), or up to 8% of the entire world's gold reserves at that time. However, it was a massive fraud and there was no gold. The core samples had been faked by salting them with outside gold. An independent lab later claimed that the faking had been poorly done, including the use of shavings from gold jewelry. In 1997, Bre-X collapsed and its shares became worthless in one of the biggest stock scandals in Canadian history."

The promulgation of a codified reporting scheme makes it more difficult for fraud to occur and reassures investors that the projects have been assessed in a scientific and professional manner. However, even properly and professionally investigated mineral deposits are not necessarily economic, nor does the presence of a NI 43-101-, JORC- or SAMREC and SAMVAL-compliant CPR or QPR necessarily mean that it is a good investment.

Similarly, the publication of a complex technical report with all the inherent jargon, technical wording and abstract geological, metallurgical and economic information may not actually significantly advantage an investor who is not able to fully nor properly understand the content or importance of this information. In this way, NI 43-101 may not serve the interests of those it is designed to protect—the retail investors who may easily misinterpret such information. Because of this, many investors hire independent geology consultants to review the reports for them.

== Requirements ==
NI 43-101 stipulates and codifies the form and content of a compliant report (i.e.; a report that complies with the Reporting Standard).

Prescribed disclosure within the National Instrument relates to;

- All disclosure of scientific or technical information, including disclosure of a mineral resource or mineral reserve, concerning a mineral project on a property material to the issuer must be based upon information prepared by or under the supervision of a qualified person
- What the National Instrument is to be used for, such as which types of mineral properties must be covered by a compliant report
- Prescribes the terminology to be used to describe various features, both geologically and financially, within the report
- Stipulates the type of information to be discussed and the technical data which must be portrayed, for various levels of reporting
- Prescribes a list of approved Competent Persons, and the definition of Groups and Associations which may qualify to certify such a person as "Qualified"
- Prescribes that a Qualified Person vouches for the accuracy and completeness of the contained information and the manner in which it is presented
- Provides guidance on reporting Historical mineral resource estimates

Proscribed disclosure within the National Instrument precludes a company from reporting;

- Quantity, grade, or metal or mineral content of a deposit that has not been categorized as an inferred mineral resource, an indicated mineral resource, a measured mineral resource, a probable mineral reserve or a proven mineral reserve
- Results of an economic analysis that includes inferred mineral resources
  - Allows for the potential grade, quantity and metal or mineral content of an exploration property, provided that a qualifying statement is made as to this being conceptual in nature
- The term preliminary feasibility study, pre-feasibility study or feasibility study when referring to a study unless the study satisfies the criteria set out in the National Instrument

=== Comparison with the JORC Code ===
The National Instrument 43-101 requires substantially more technical disclosure to the market than the equivalent JORC Code, because the JORC Code is primarily a code for reporting the status of a mineral resource, whereas NI 43-101 is a code of securities disclosure. This distinction is based on the derivation of the two codes: the JORC Code is derived from the Joint Ore Reserves Committee, an independent mineral industry body formed from industry professional associations; NI 43-101 is a code derived from the Canadian Securities Authorities. The JORC Code, were it equal with NI 43-101 would be derived from the Australian Securities and Investment Commission, not the relevant industry bodies.

The technical information required in a Reserve declaration under NI 43-101 exceeds that within the JORC Code, primarily by stipulating that certain geological parameters of the mineral reserve must be presented within a report, published in full, and presented in a particular way. Conversely, in Australia, technical reports are prepared in accordance with JORC guidelines and are not commonly published in full upon the Australian Stock Exchange as this is not required by Australian regulatory authorities. Therefore, often a summary of the key points is published, which can often preserve commercially sensitive information, and often this could allow deleterious information to remain out of the public forum.

=== Qualified Persons Statement ===
The instrument requires that a "qualified person" be attributed to the information. This Qualified Person, in the spirit of the National Instrument, is required to be a reputable professional who is knowledgeable of the mineral property concerned, and who has sufficient experience and qualifications to make the statements which are made within the report. Often the Qualified Person need not be the author of the report, but in attributing the report as being compliant with the National Instrument, they are vouching for it. This is a matter of professional integrity and carries legal risk, as misleading statements can result in legal sanctions in Canadian and other jurisdictions.

A qualified person is defined in the National Instrument as:

- is an engineer or geoscientist with at least five years of experience in mineral exploration, mine development or operation or mineral project assessment, or any combination of these;
- has experience relevant to the subject matter of the mineral project and the technical report; and
- is in good standing with a professional association and, in the case of a foreign association, is of recognized stature within that organization.

The requirement for a Qualified Person in NI 43-101 is different from that required by the JORC Code, and the SAMREC and SAMVAL Codes, wherein the person must have 5 years experience relevant to the deposit type or style of mineralization but is otherwise similar in terms of who may or may not sign off on such a document.

The Qualified Person must declare whether a qualified person has verified the data disclosed, including sampling, analytical and test data underlying the information or opinions contained in the written disclosure; a description of how the data was verified and any limitations on the verification process; and an explanation of any failure to verify the data.

== See also ==
- Mineral resource classification
- Definition of Ore
- Mineral exploration
- Pan African Resource Reporting Code
- United Nations Framework Classification for Resources
- United Nations Resource Management System
