= UNFC =

UNFC may refer to:

- United Nationalities Federal Council
- United Nations Framework Classification for Resources
