= Ben Stillman =

American film producer

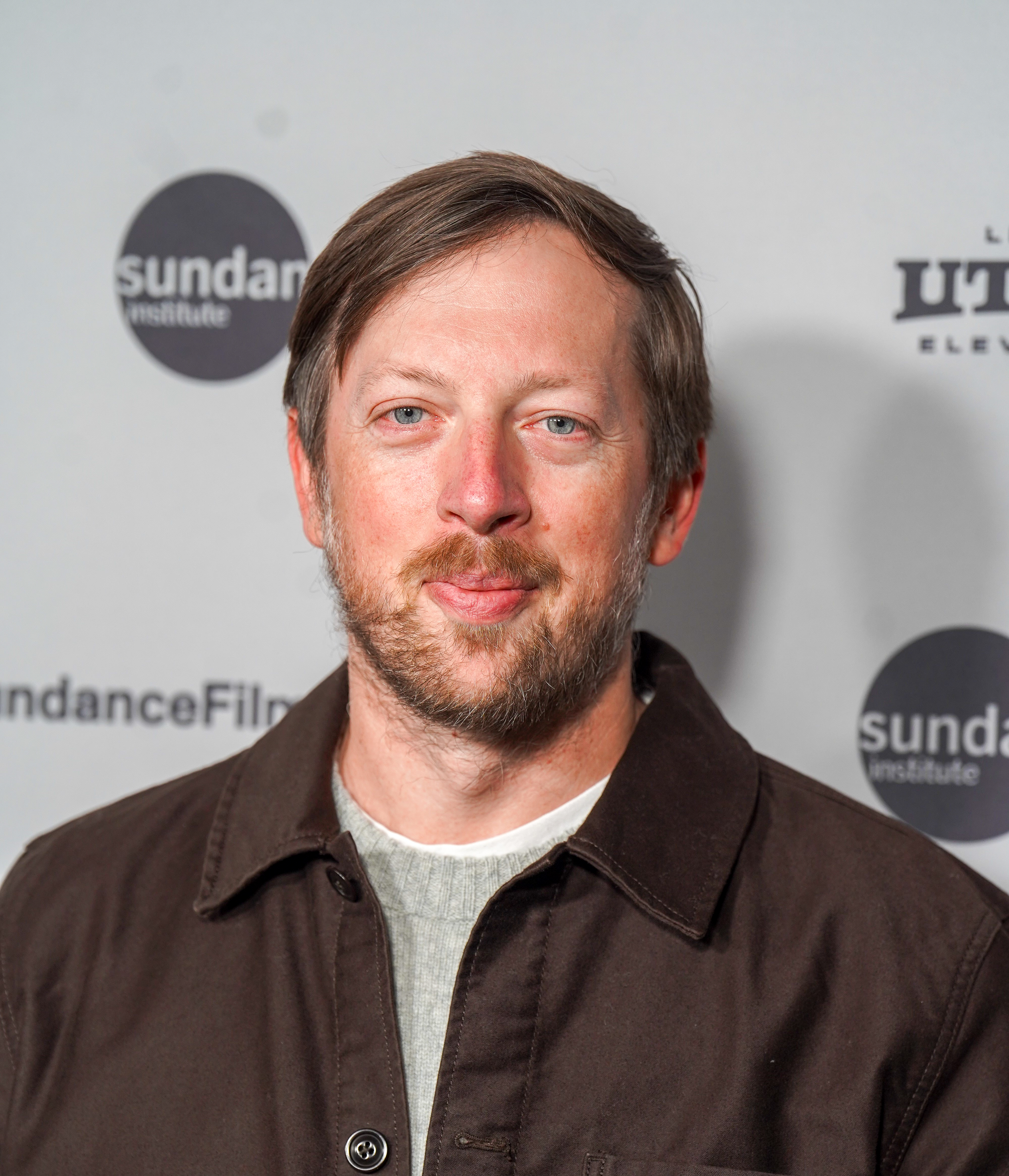
- Ben Stillman at the 2026 Sundance Film Festival
- Occupations: Film producer; Vice president of Black Bear Pictures
- Notable work: The Imitation Game, Gold

Ben Stillman is an American film producer. Stillman assisted in the development of the Oscar-winning film The Imitation Game in 2014. He has produced four films including Broken City, which premiered at Sundance Film Festival, and Gold (2016) starring Matthew McConaughey in 2016. Stillman is vice president of Black Bear Pictures.

== Career ==
In 2011, Black Bear Pictures was established and Stillman joined the company as creative executive after leaving Cinetic International. Stillman was associate producer of At Any Price in 2012. He was named vice president of Black Bear Pictures in 2013. He co-produced A.C.O.D. starring Adam Scott, as well as Broken City, starring Mark Wahlberg and Russell Crowe, in 2013. He was executive producer of Gold, a drama-thriller film about the search for gold in the jungles of Indonesia that was scheduled to be released in 2016.

== Filmography ==
He was producer for all films unless otherwise noted.

=== Film ===
| Year | Film | Credit |
|---|---|---|
| 2012 | At Any Price | Associate producer |
| 2013 | Broken City | Co-producer |
| 2013 | A.C.O.D. | Co-producer |
| 2016 | Barry | |
| 2016 | Gold | Executive producer |
| 2018 | The Happytime Murders | Executive producer |
| 2018 | Ben Is Back | Executive producer |
| 2019 | Light of My Life | Executive producer |
| 2019 | The Operative | Executive producer |
| 2019 | Our Friend | Executive producer |
| 2020 | I Carry You with Me | Executive producer |
| 2020 | The Rental | |
| 2020 | I Care a Lot | |
| 2020 | Little Fish | Executive producer |
| 2022 | Memory | Executive producer |
| 2023 | Somebody I Used to Know | |
| 2024 | Dreams in Nightmares | |
| 2026 | If I Go Will They Miss Me | |

Miscellaneous crew

| Year | Film | Role |
|---|---|---|
| 2013 | A.C.O.D. | Vice president: Black Bear Pictures |
| 2014 | The Imitation Game | Vice president: Black Bear Pictures |
