= The Rental =

2020 film by Dave Franco

- Theatrical release poster
- Directed by: Dave Franco
- Screenplay by: Dave Franco; Joe Swanberg
- Story by: Dave Franco; Joe Swanberg; Mike Demski
- Produced by: Dave Franco; Elizabeth Haggard; Teddy Schwarzman; Ben Stillman; Joe Swanberg; Christopher Storer
- Starring: Dan Stevens; Alison Brie; Sheila Vand; Jeremy Allen White; Toby Huss
- Cinematography: Christian Sprenger
- Edited by: Kyle Reiter
- Music by: Saunder Jurriaans; Danny Bensi
- Production company: Black Bear Pictures
- Distributed by: IFC Films (United States); STXfilms (International)
- Release dates: June 18, 2020 (Vineland Drive-In); July 24, 2020 (United States)
- Running time: 88 minutes
- Country: United States
- Language: English
- Budget: $3.5 million
- Box office: $4.3 million

The Rental is a 2020 American horror film co-written, produced and directed by Dave Franco, in his feature directorial debut. Franco co-wrote the screenplay with Joe Swanberg from a story by Franco, Swanberg, and Mike Demski. It stars Dan Stevens, Alison Brie, Sheila Vand, Jeremy Allen White, and Toby Huss, and follows two couples who begin to suspect they are being watched in the house they rented.

The film was released on video-on-demand (VOD) and in select theaters in the United States on July 24, 2020, by IFC Films. It received generally positive reviews from critics, and became the second film to ever top VOD charts and the box office in the same weekend.

== Plot ==
Charlie, his wife Michelle, his brother Josh, and Josh's girlfriend/Charlie's business partner Mina rent a remote house on the Oregon Coast for a weekend getaway. The caretaker, Taylor, gives them the housekey, but they get a negative impression of him. In the evening, Michelle gives the others MDMA (ecstasy), but she does not take any herself and goes to bed early. After Josh passes out on the couch, Mina and Charlie kiss in the hot tub and have sex in the shower.

The next morning, Michelle and Josh leave for a hike. Charlie and Mina agree their one-night stand was a mistake and will remain a secret. While taking a shower, Mina discovers a hidden camera and alerts Charlie; the two believe Taylor installed it. Charlie stops her from calling the police, fearing Michelle and Josh would learn of their affair. He assures her that Taylor would not reveal the footage because he would have to admit spying on them.

That night, Josh realizes his dog is missing, while Michelle takes ecstasy and calls Taylor over to fix the hot tub. Josh is suspicious that Taylor may have taken the dog, so he confronts Taylor upon his arrival, but he denies it. Taylor fixes the hot tub, and Mina privately confronts him about the hidden camera in the shower, which he claims to be unaware of. Mina threatens to call the police but Taylor calls her bluff and they start arguing loudly. Josh rushes in and, assuming Taylor was attacking Mina, beats him unconscious. Mina is forced to reveal the hidden camera, but while the group discusses what to do outside, a masked stranger sneaks in and suffocates Taylor. When the others find Taylor dead in the bathroom, they assume that he died from Josh's beating.

Frantic, Michelle demands they call the police, but Charlie refuses, unwilling to let Josh, who has previously been incarcerated, return to prison. He suggests staging Taylor's death as an accident by throwing him off the cliff into the ocean. Michelle refuses to take part and goes to the bedroom. The other three carry Taylor's body to the cliff. It falls onto an outcrop, forcing Josh to go down and push it into the sea. Back at the house, Michelle is lured into a room where a TV plays the footage of Charlie and Mina having sex. Michelle angrily confronts Charlie and drives off. Down the road, she runs over metal spikes, crashes into a tree, and is attacked by the stranger while texting Charlie for help.

Charlie goes to search for Michelle. He finds her dead body on the road and is then attacked and murdered by the stranger. Back at the house, Mina and Josh are looking for the shower camera's transceiver to destroy any footage it recorded. Josh receives a video from Charlie's phone showing him and Mina having sex. Josh then hears someone enter the house and, thinking it is Charlie, rushes to confront him. Instead, the stranger attacks and kills Josh as Mina flees. Pursued through the forest in darkness and fog, she accidentally runs off a cliff and falls into the ocean.

The stranger returns to the house, removing all evidence and surveillance equipment. As he is about to leave, Josh's dog enters through the back door. The killer pets the dog gently and departs. He rents a new property and installs cameras in it to carry out further serial killings.

== Cast ==
- Dan Stevens as Charlie
- Alison Brie as Michelle
- Sheila Vand as Mina Mohammadi
- Jeremy Allen White as Josh
- Toby Huss as Taylor

== Production ==
In March 2019, it was announced Alison Brie, Dan Stevens, Sheila Vand and Jeremy Allen White had joined the cast of the film, with Dave Franco directing from a screenplay he wrote alongside Joe Swanberg. Franco, Elizabeth Haggard, Ben Stillman, Teddy Schwarzman, Swanberg and Christopher Storer served as producers on the film, under their Ramona Films and Black Bear Pictures banners, respectively, while Michael Heimler and Sean Durkin acted as executive producers.

Principal photography began on April 22, 2019, lasting through May 24, in Bandon and Portland, Oregon.

Saunder Jurriaans and Danny Bensi composed the film's score, released by Lakeshore Records.

== Release ==
In April 2020, IFC Films acquired U.S. distribution rights to the film and scheduled it to be released on July 24, 2020. Due to the COVID-19 pandemic, the film held its premiere at the Vineland Drive-In theatre in City of Industry, California on June 18, 2020.

== Reception ==
=== Box office and VOD ===
The film made an estimated $130,000 from 251 theaters in its first day, and $420,871 over the weekend, topping the box office. It also was the top-rented film on Apple TV, the iTunes Store and other streaming services, becoming just the second film to ever top both the box office and rental charts. In its second weekend the film retained the top spot at the box office, grossing $290,272 from 242 theaters. It also remained in the top 10 at the iTunes Store, Apple TV, and Spectrum's rental charts. In its third weekend the film made $123,700 at the box office and came in fourth, while also remaining the top-rented horror film at iTunes.

=== Critical response ===
On review aggregator Rotten Tomatoes, the film holds an approval rating of 74% based on 196 reviews, with an average rating of 6.4/10. The website's critics consensus reads: "Some tricky genre juggling makes The Rental a bit of a fixer-upper, but effective chills and a solid cast make this a fine destination for horror fans." On Metacritic, the film has a weighted average score of 62 out of 100, based on 30 critics, indicating "generally favorable reviews".

Writing for the Chicago Sun-Times, Richard Roeper gave the film three-and-a-half stars out of four, saying: "The Rental would have worked purely as a compelling character study about four dysfunctional adults unraveling over the course of a long weekend — but when the presence of a homicidal maniac is introduced to the proceedings, the transition to horror film is brilliant and wacky and pretty darn great." Owen Gleiberman of Variety said the film had "tense flavor and skill" and wrote: "There's some crafty artistry at work in The Rental, and also some fairly standard pandering, which feels like a violation of the movie's better instincts. That said, most of it is skillful and engrossing enough to establish Franco as a director to watch." In a negative review, Oliver Jones of the Observer said the film’s ideas aren’t fully explored or developed enough, which results in "a tweener: a film that is part infidelity drama and part slasher film while never fully committing to either idea." Jones added the plot felt "paper-thin" and the characters insubstantial, concluding "there are seeds of ideas about the toxicity of aspirational real estate and those that indifferently own it that could have possibly have flowered into something worth exploring."

== Potential sequel ==
Franco has voiced his interest in a sequel, saying: "It was the intention from the beginning to leave the ending ambiguous enough that we carry on the story if given a chance... I have a very strong idea for what I would want to do with a sequel."
