= Joseph Groia =

Canadian lawyer

Joseph Groia is a Canadian lawyer specializing in securities litigation. He has been ranked as one of Canada's 500 Leading Lawyers (Lexpert) since 2000 and is consistently rated as one of Canada's top securities litigators by the same publication. He has worked on many of Canada's leading securities cases, including Asbestos Corp., Bre-X Minerals Ltd., Canadian Tire, Cinar Corporation, Hollinger, Torstar/Southam, Philip Services and YBM.

He received his BA and LL.B. from the University of Toronto in 1976 and 1979, respectively. He was called to the Ontario Bar in 1981. At the beginning of his career, he worked for McTaggart, Potts, Stone & Herridge and then McMillan Binch before moving to the Ontario Securities Commission in 1985 where he served as Associate General Counsel and then Director of Enforcement. In 1990, he joined the Toronto office of Heenan Blaikie as a litigation partner and stayed there until he founded Groia & Company in 2000, where he is a Principal.

== Bre-X and the trial of John B. Felderhof ==
Mr. Groia is perhaps best known for his successful defence of John Felderhof in an almost decade-long trial resulting from the Bre-X Minerals scandal, the largest mining fraud in Canadian history. The gold-mining scandal was the result of Bre-X Minerals's false reports of an enormous gold deposit at Busang, Indonesia. Bre-X bought the Busang site in March 1993 and, in October 1995, announced significant amounts of gold had been discovered, sending its stock price soaring. Originally a penny stock, its market price reached a peak at CAD $286.50 per share in May 1996 on the Toronto Stock Exchange (TSE), with a total capitalization of over CAD $6 billion. Bre-X Minerals collapsed in 1997 after the gold samples were found to be a fraud.

In May 1999, the Ontario Securities Commission charged Mr. Felderhof, Bre-X Minerals's Vice-President of Exploration, with insider trading and participating in misleading press releases. The trial was an acrimonious one and was suspended in April 2001 when the OSC tried to have the presiding judge, Justice Peter Hryn, removed for alleged bias against the prosecution. This request was denied by justice Archie Campbell, and, on 10 December 2003, the appeal was denied by the Ontario Court of Appeal. Felderhof's trial resumed in 2005, and he was acquitted on the merits of charges in a 600-page decision in 2007.

== Bre-X and the Law Society of Upper Canada ==
Since Felderhof's acquittal, the Law Society of Upper Canada has found Groia guilty of incivility during the defence of Felderhof. Groia's appeal against the LSUC's misconduct ruling was thrown out by an Ontario Divisional Court in early February 2015, but Groia stated that he intended to pursue the matter further at the Court of Appeal. The LSUC's judgement has been heavily criticized by numerous Canadian legal commentators, including the Criminal Lawyers Association, for its "potential chilling effect upon defence counsel". After a long legal battle, on 1 June 2018, Groia prevailed, as the Supreme Court of Canada ultimately concluded that a finding of professional misconduct by the Law Society's Appeal Tribunal “against [Groia] on the basis of incivility was unreasonable."

== Other activities ==
Mr. Groia has been committed to legal education throughout his career. He has presented securities and corporate law papers at McGill University's Meredith Lectures, the Peat Marwick Memorial Lectures, the Law Society of Upper Canada Special Lectures, the Langdon Hall Securities Law Practitioners' Programme and the Oxford Conference on International Securities Fraud. He has taught classes in securities law and trial practice at the University of Alberta, Windsor Law School, Osgoode Hall Law School, University of Western Ontario, Dalhousie University, University of Ottawa Law School, McGill University Faculty of Law and the University of Toronto.

In 2007, Mr. Groia and Pamela Hardie published Canada's first and only textbook on securities litigation, Securities Litigation and Enforcement. The second edition was published in 2012.

In 2018, Mr. Groia accepted to represent businessperson Kevin O'Leary in his lawsuit contesting the constitutionality of certain election finance rules.
