= David Walsh (mining) =

Canadian businessman

- Born: August 11, 1945; Montreal, Quebec, Canada
- Died: June 4, 1998 (aged 52); Nassau, Bahamas
- Known for: Founder of Bre-X
- Spouse: Jeannette Toukhmanian
- Children: 2

David Walsh (August 11, 1945 – June 4, 1998) was a Canadian businessman notable as the founder and largest shareholder of Bre-X, a mining firm that enacted the largest fraud in Canadian mining history.

== Biography ==
Walsh was born and grew up in Westmount, an English-speaking part of Montreal. His father was a stockbroker. At age 19, Walsh began work at investment desk of Eastern Trust while taking finance and accounting classes at night. In 1969, at age 24, he was head of the company’s investment department. When he was 29 years old, he was the youngest person ever to be named vice president of Midland-Doherty, a Montreal brokerage firm. In 1975, he was pressured to leave the firm after he arranged to sell stock shares that a friend of his had stolen.

In 1982, he moved to Calgary, where he first became involved in the mining industry. He founded Bresea Resources Ltd. in 1984, taking the name from the names of his sons, Brett and Sean.

The firm struggled for many years; Walsh and his wife were heavily in debt and declared personal bankruptcy in early 1993.

In March 1993, on the advice of geologist John Felderhof, Bre-X bought a property in the jungle near the Busang River in Kalimantan, Indonesia.

In 1996, the company moved its headquarters from the Walsh family home in Varsity, Calgary to Kensington, Calgary.

The company claimed it had found one of the largest gold deposits in the world at the mine, sending its share price soaring. Walsh and his family sold tens of millions of dollars in stock as the share price rose. In May 1997, Bre-X was exposed as a fraud and filed for bankruptcy protection; thousands of investors were defrauded.

Walsh and his wife moved to the Bahamas in April 1996, allegedly to be away from the public, where they purchased a multimillion-dollar colonial estate. In May 1998, two masked gunmen broke into his home in Nassau, tying him up, and threatened to shoot him unless he turned over all his money. The incident ended peacefully but three weeks later, on June 4, 1998, Walsh died of a brain aneurysm at age 52, four days after suffering a massive stroke and being put onto life support while in a coma at Doctors Hospital.

== Personal life ==
Walsh married Jeannette Toukhmanian, a secretary at Midland. At one point, Jeannette initiated divorce proceedings; however, they were dropped. They had two sons, Brett and Sean. Walsh was overweight and a heavy smoker and drinker.

== In popular culture ==
- The Bre-X scandal inspired the 2016 film Gold, in which Matthew McConaughey plays Kenny Wells, who is based on Walsh.
