= Business reporting =

Business reporting or enterprise reporting may refer to:

== Public reporting ==
- Annual report, yearly report on a company's activities
- Financial reporting, formal record of the financial activities and position of a business, person, or other entity
- SEC filings, type of financial statements in the United States

== Internal reporting ==
- Business intelligence, strategies and technologies used by enterprises for the data analysis and management of business information

== See also ==
- Reporting (disambiguation)
