= Bondan Winarno =

Indonesian writer and journalist

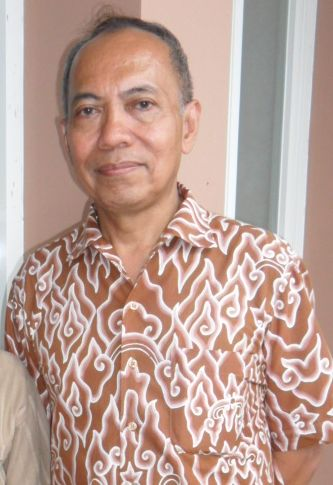
- Winarno in 2011
- Born: Bondan Haryo Winarno; 29 April 1950; Surabaya, East Java State, RUSI
- Died: 29 November 2017 (aged 67); Jakarta, Indonesia
- Occupations: Culinary expert, writer, journalist
- Known for: Journalist, writer, TV presenter
- Political party: Gerindra
- Spouse: Yvonne Raket (m. 1975)
- Children: Marisol Font Raket; Eliseo Font Raket; Gwendoline Winarno

Bondan Winarno (29 April 1950 – 29 November 2017) was an Indonesian writer and journalist with a variety of skills. He pioneered and became chairman of Jalansutra, a very popular culinary community in Indonesia. He also became a presenter in the culinary show Wisata Kuliner (Culinary Tour) on Trans TV. He was famous for his phrase "Pokoe maknyus!"
