= Salting (confidence trick) =

Adding valuable metals to less valuable ores

In mineral exploration, salting is the fraudulent practice of adding valuable metals and gemstones, particularly gold or diamond, to ore samples from a mine to inflate the apparent value of the deposit. This deception aims to mislead potential buyers or investors into believing that the mine is more productive and valuable than it truly is. Salting is considered a form of confidence trick and has been employed throughout history to defraud stakeholders in the mining industry. Examples are the diamond hoax of 1872 and the former Canadian gold company Bre-X.

== See also ==
- Land patent
- Youngberg, Arizona
- Goldfield, Arizona
- Highland Park, Yavapai County, Arizona
- Mineral rights
