= Bre-X =

Canadian mining company (1989–2003)

Bre-X Minerals Ltd.
- Type: Defunct
- Industry: Mining
- Founded: 1989; 37 years ago
- Founder: David Walsh
- Defunct: 2003; 23 years ago
- Fate: Bankruptcy
- Headquarters: Kensington, Calgary, Alberta, Canada
- Key people: Michael de Guzman, Chief Geologist; John Felderhof, VP of Exploration
- Products: Gold

Bre-X Minerals Ltd. was a Canadian company that perpetrated a major fraud when it claimed that there was an enormous gold deposit at its gold mine in Busang, East Kalimantan, Indonesia. However, samples from the mine were "salted" and, in reality, the mine did not contain much gold at all; an estimated 40,000 investors were defrauded and lost their entire investments.

Bre-X bought the Busang site in March 1993. In October 1995, the company announced that significant amounts of gold had been discovered, sending its stock price soaring. Originally a penny stock, its stock price reached a peak at CAD$286.50/share (split adjusted) in May 1996, with a total market capitalization of over CAD$6 billion.

The company collapsed in May 1997 after the gold samples were found to be fraudulent.

Filipino chief geologist Michael de Guzman is widely considered to be the mastermind behind the fraud. However, due to his highly suspicious death, the death of founder David Walsh, and a lack of evidence that other executives knew about the fraud, no one was criminally convicted.

== History ==
Bresea logo.

David Walsh founded Bre-X Minerals Ltd. in 1989 as a subsidiary of Bresea Resources Ltd. The name Bresea was derived from the first names of Walsh's two sons: Brett and Sean. Bre-X stock was listed on the Alberta Stock Exchange in 1989. The company always lost money. In March 1993, on the advice of geologist John Felderhof, the company bought a property in the jungle near the Busang River in Kalimantan, Indonesia. Felderholf had co-discovered the Ok Tedi Mine in Papua New Guinea in the late 1960s; it was later declared to be an environmental disaster.

In May 1993, Felderhof was hired as general manager in charge of Bre-X's Indonesian exploration and, in October 1994, he was appointed vice-president of exploration.

Early tests showed no gold at the site. However, in December 1993, days before the license was set to expire, de Guzman told Walsh that he knew the precise spot they needed to drill at Busang I; the location had come to him in a dream.

In May 1995, Bre-X began drilling at Busang II, with positive results.

The first estimate was approximately 2,000,000 troy ounces (69 short tons; 62 t) of gold at the site. In 1995, it was increased to 30,000,000 troy ounces (1,000 short tons; 930 t); in 1996, it was 60,000,000 troy ounces (2,100 short tons; 1,900 t); finally, in 1997, it was 70,000,000 troy ounces (2,400 short tons; 2,200 t), as estimated by Kilborn Engineering, a division of SNC-Lavalin of Montreal. Felderhof said that the mine even had the potential for 200,000,000 troy ounces (6,900 short tons; 6,200 t), although the company itself never confirmed those estimates. If Bre-X‘s gold claims had been real, the company would have had roughly 8% of the world's gold supply.

In 1996, the company moved its headquarters from the Walsh family home in Varsity, Calgary to Kensington, Calgary.

In April 1996, the company was listed on the Toronto Stock Exchange and opened for trading at $187.50/share. In August 1996, it was listed on the Montreal Exchange and the NASDAQ. The share price of Bre-X rose to CA$280 per share in 1997 (split adjusted) and at its peak it had a market capitalization of CAD$6 billion.

Stating that a small company like Bre-X could not exploit the site by itself, Indonesian President Suharto initially suggested that Bre-X share the site with Barrick Mining, in association with Suharto's daughter Siti Hardiyanti Rukmana.

Bre-X hired Suharto's son, Sigit Hardjojudanto. Bob Hasan, another Suharto acquaintance, negotiated a deal whereby Bre-X would have a 45% share, Freeport-McMoRan would run the mine, and Hasan would get a cut. Bre-X would have the land rights for 30 years. The deal was announced on February 17, 1997 and Freeport-McMoRan began its due diligence.

Placer Dome offered to buy Bre-X to finance development of the mine, but cancelled its offer on February 21, 1997.

On March 10, 1997, Freeport-McMoRan received due diligence results that showed an insignificant amount of gold in the mine.

== Death of Michael de Guzman ==
On March 19, 1997, at their request, de Guzman went to the mine site to meet with the Freeport due diligence team to discuss the negative results. Twenty minutes into the helicopter ride, Michael de Guzman died, reportedly by suicide by jumping from the helicopter, prompting a trading halt in the company's stock. de Guzman also allegedly suffered from Hepatitis B and recurring malaria and allegedly attempted to kill himself the day before the incident, although others said he was in good spirits. He left behind a few hastily scrawled suicide notes and a Rolex watch. A body was found 4 days later in the jungle, mostly eaten by animals, missing the hands and feet, which were "surgically removed". The body showed evidence of strangulation and did not have de Guzman's dentures, making it inconsistent with the suicide reports. The remains were found 400 metres from a logging road and could have been planted. According to journalist John McBeth, a body had gone missing from the morgue of the town from which the helicopter flew. No one saw the body except another Filipino geologist, who claimed it was de Guzman. The body was hastily cremated without DNA testing or confirmation of dental records. One of the five women who considered themselves to be de Guzman's wife claimed to receive a payment from de Guzman years after his alleged death, although she did not provide any evidence. These all led to speculation that de Guzman faked his own death and took his riches to South America or that he was killed by the Filipino mafia to keep him quiet.

== Fraud exposed ==
After Freeport confirmed that its testing showed "an insignificant amount of gold" at the mine, Bre-X demanded more reviews and commissioned a review of the test drilling. On April 1, 1997, Bre-X made a futile attempt to allay investor concerns. However, despite the evidence, several stock analysts still insisted that the company really did own the world’s biggest gold deposit.

An independent company, Strathcona Minerals, was hired to make its own analysis; on May 4, 1997, the firm reported that the crushed core samples that had been subjected to mineralogical examination by Bre-X's consultants were falsified by salting with gold dust. The lab's tests showed that gold in one hole had been shaved off gold jewellery though it has never been proved at what stage it had been added to those samples. This gold also occurred in quantities that did not support the original assays. De Guzman used realistic ratios of gold to rock to not cause alarm. Over 2.5 years, he purchased an estimated $61,000 worth of panned gold from locals to salt the mine.

On May 7, shares plunged to 6 cents each; volume set a record on the Toronto Stock Exchange. People bought shares in hopes that the stock certificates would become collectables.

On May 9, 1997, Bre-X Minerals Ltd., as well as sister companies Bresea and Bro-X, filed for bankruptcy protection. The Walsh family owned 19% of the company and Deloitte owned 12%.

== Aftermath ==
Among the major investors were three Canadian public sector organizations: The Ontario Municipal Employees Retirement Board (loss of $45 million), the Caisse de dépôt et placement du Québec, the Quebec Public Sector Pension fund (loss of $70 million), and the Ontario Teachers' Pension Plan (loss of $100 million). The fraud also proved a major embarrassment for Peter Munk, the head of Barrick Gold, as well as for the then-head of the Toronto Stock Exchange, resulting in his ousting by 1999.

On November 5, 1997, Deloitte was appointed as Trustee in Bankruptcy.

Walsh and his wife moved to the Bahamas in April 1996, allegedly to be away from the public, where they purchased a multimillion-dollar colonial estate. In May 1998, two masked gunmen broke into his home in Nassau, tying him up, and threatened to shoot him unless he turned over all his money. The incident ended peacefully but three weeks later, on June 4, 1998, Walsh died of a brain aneurysm at age 52.

In May 1999, the Royal Canadian Mounted Police (RCMP) ended its investigation without pressing criminal charges against anyone. Critics noted that the RCMP was underfunded and understaffed to handle complex criminal fraud cases, and that Canadian laws in this area were inadequate.

In May 1999, the Ontario Securities Commission (OSC) charged Felderhof with insider trading and spreading false information, the only charges filed by the OSC. Felderholf sold C$84 million of Bre-X stock in 1996. However, there was no evidence that Felderhof was either involved in or aware of the fraud. The OSC argued that he should have been aware based on "red flags". The trial was suspended in April 2001 when the OSC tried to have presiding judge Justice Peter Hryn removed for alleged bias against the prosecution. This was denied by an independent judge, and on December 10, 2003, the appeal was also denied by a panel of judges. The trial resumed in 2005. On August 9, 2007, Felderholf, represented by Joseph Groia, received a not-guilty verdict on the charge of insider trading.

After the plaintiffs realized their case was hopeless, the class action lawsuit was discontinued by court order in early 2014; lawyers received C$850,000 in fees and the C$3.5 million remaining in the trust was donated 80% to the Law Foundation of Ontario and 20% to the University of Ottawa since funds were deemed too low to be meaningfully distributed among the 40,000 investors.

Felderhof died in October 2019, in Manila, Philippines, aged 79.

Canadian securities regulation National Instrument 43-101 was created and went into force on February 1, 2001 to protect investors from unsubstantiated mineral project disclosures. It requires qualified persons to be involved, standardized reporting, and clearer boundaries around what could and could not be said.

== In popular media ==
=== Books ===
- Hutchinson, Brian (May 1, 1999). Fools' Gold: The Making of a Global Market Fraud. Knopf Canada. ISBN 978-0-676-97192-7.
- Bre-X: sebungkah emas di kaki pelangi by Bondan Winarno. ISBN 9789799523808 (1997)
- Bre-X: Gold Today, Gone Tomorrow by James Whyte and Vivian Danielson
- Indonesian Gold by Kerry B. Collison — a fictionalised account
- Hellman, Phillip (May 2002). "New Perspectives on Busang". The Northern Miner.
- Fever: The Dark Mystery of the Bre-X Gold Rush by Jennifer Wells
- Francis, Diane (1997). Bre-X, The Inside Story. Key Porter Books.
- Reporter. Forty Years Covering Asia by John McBeth, Talisman Publishing, Singapore, 2011. ISBN 9789810873646

=== Podcasts ===
- The Six Billion Dollar Gold Scam. April 25, 2024 – via Apple Podcasts.
- Swindled. November 24, 2025 – via Apple Podcasts.

=== Documentaries ===
- How The Bre-X Gold Mine Scandal Swindled Thousands - Masterminds - Fools Gold. Masterminds – via YouTube.

=== Film ===
The film Gold (2017) is a fictionalized drama, whose story and characters were inspired by Bre-X. The theme song for the movie, also titled "Gold", was written by Iggy Pop and Danger Mouse.
