= Pan African Resource Reporting Code =

The Pan-African Resource Reporting Code (PARC) is a standardized framework for public reporting of African mineral and energy resources. Developed under the auspices of the African Minerals Development Centre (AMDC), PARC aims to enhance transparency, consistency, and competence in the certification and reporting processes within the African mining sector.

== History ==
PARC was developed as part of the African Minerals and Energy Resources Classification and Management System (AMREC), a tool designed to implement the Africa Mining Vision (AMV). The AMV, adopted by African Heads of State in 2009, seeks to optimize the utilization of Africa's mineral resources for sustainable development. The policy document for AMREC/PARC was approved by the African Union's Special Technical Committee in September 2021 and was subsequently endorsed by the Executive Council in February 2022.

== Objectives ==
The primary objectives of PARC include:

- Standardizing the reporting processes for mineral and energy resources in Africa.
- Enhancing investor confidence by promoting transparency and consistency.
- Aligning resource reporting with the social, environmental, and economic goals outlined in the AMV and Agenda 2063.

== Governance and structure ==
PARC is governed by the AMDC, with oversight provided by a dedicated PARC Assessment Committee. This committee ensures adherence to the standards and principles outlined in the code. It is also responsible for accrediting Competent Persons (CPs) and Recognized Professional Organizations (RPOs) that meet PARC's stringent requirements.

== Standards and guidelines ==
PARC sets comprehensive guidelines for the public reporting of mineral and energy resources. PARC is based on the United Nations Framework Classification for Resources (UNFC) and the United Nations Resource Management System (UNRMS). Key aspects include:

- Classification based on the environmental-socio-economic viability (E), technical feasibility (F), and degree of confidence (G) axes.
- Detailed criteria for the qualifications and responsibilities of Competent Persons.
- Ethical standards and enforcement mechanisms to maintain the integrity of the reporting process.

== Implementation ==
The implementation of PARC involves:

- National and regional adoption of the code by African countries.
- Training and accreditation programs for Competent Persons.
- Continuous monitoring and updates to ensure the code remains relevant and effective.

== See also ==
- United Nations Framework Classification for Resources
- United Nations Resource Management System
