= United Nations Resource Management System =

The United Nations Resource Management System (UNRMS) is a voluntary global standard for managing natural resources sustainably. It is based on the United Nations Framework Classification for Resources (UNFC). UNRMS aims to support the Sustainable Development Goals (SDGs) by providing a comprehensive framework and methodology for resource progression, policy development, and financing.

== Background ==
UNRMS is a sustainable resource management system developed by the United Nations Economic Commission for Europe (UNECE). It was created to address unsustainable resource supply and use patterns to mitigate environmental and societal impacts while ensuring long-term resource availability. The UNRMS was initiated in 2017 and goes beyond classification, offering a holistic approach to resource management. It promotes technologies for efficient resource discovery, recovery, and processing. The UNRMS is a significant step towards harmonizing economic, environmental, and social objectives in resource utilization.

== Objectives and goals ==
UNRMS is a sustainable management framework that aims to enhance resource efficiency and reduce environmental impact. It is designed to promote circular economy by considering resources as interconnected elements of a broader ecosystem. The system supports stakeholders in adopting sustainable practices across various resource sectors, contributing to achieving SDGs and ensuring responsible production and use of natural resources for present and future generations.

== Framework and methodology ==
UNRMS framework is based on 12 fundamental principles and 54 requirements. It uses a unique methodology that assesses resources based on their environmental, social, and economic viability, technical feasibility and confidence in estimates. This approach is a sustainable pathway for resource progression, considering its impact on society and the environment. The methodology promotes high-impact technologies for efficient resource discovery, recovery, and processing, intending to advance sustainable resource management practices that can be adapted to various types of resources and geographical contexts.

The fundamental principles of UNRMs are:

1. State rights and responsibilities in the management of resources
2. Responsibility to the planet
3. Integrated management of resources
4. Social engagement
5. Service orientation
6. Comprehensive resource recovery
7. Value addition
8. Circularity
9. Health and safety
10. Innovation
11. Transparency
12. Continuous strengthening of core competencies and capabilities.

== Application and coverage ==
UNRMS extends its application across diverse resources, including minerals, petroleum, renewable energy, nuclear and anthropogenic resources, geological storage and groundwater. It is a versatile tool for stakeholders, encompassing governments, industries, and civil society, to manage resources that align with sustainable development goals. UNRMS's coverage is not limited to isolated sectors but spans a region's entire resource base, promoting an integrated approach to resource management that supports policy development, technological advancement, and sustainable financing.

Various regions have adopted UNRMS to improve the sustainability of their natural resource management, aligning with global sustainability goals and climate agreements. Assessments have demonstrated the effectiveness of the UNRMS by identifying gaps in existing resource management systems and providing actionable recommendations for improvements, thereby proving its utility in enhancing sustainable development practices. UNRMS has proven effective at the sub-national level by providing a comprehensive framework that guides regions in enhancing their resource management systems, leading to improved sustainability and adherence to global environmental standards.

== See also ==
- United Nations Framework Classification for Resources
- Pan African Resource Reporting Code
