= United Nations Framework Classification for Resources =

International standard for energy, mineral and raw material resources

United Nations Framework Classification for Resources (UNFC) is an international scheme for the classification, management and reporting of energy, mineral, and raw material resources. United Nations Economic Commission for Europe's (UNECE) Expert Group on Resource Management (EGRM) is responsible for the promotion and further development of UNFC.

== Development ==
Classification and management of natural resources such as minerals and petroleum are classified using differing schemes. In 1997, UNECE published the United Nations Framework Classification for Reserves and Resources of Solid Fuels and Mineral Commodities (UNFC-1997) as a unifying international system for classifying solid minerals and fuels. In 2004, the Classification was revised to include petroleum (oil and natural gas) and uranium and renamed the UNFC for Fossil Energy and Mineral Resources 2004 (UNFC-2004). In 2009, a simplified United Nations Framework Classification for Fossil Energy and Mineral Reserves and Resources 2009 (UNFC-2009) was published. In response to the application of UNFC being extended to renewable energy, injection projects for geological storage and anthropogenic resources, the name was changed in 2017 to the United Nations Framework Classification for Resources (UNFC). An updated version of UNFC, with improved terminology, was released in 2019.

== Application ==
The UNFC system is used for:

1. Policy formulation in energy and raw material studies
2. National resources management functions
3. Corporate business processes
4. Financial reporting

UNFC currently applies to minerals, petroleum, renewable energy, nuclear fuel resources, injection projects for geological storage, and anthropogenic resources. Application of UNFC to groundwater resources is being evaluated.

== Implementation ==
UNFC has been adopted as the basis of national resource classification in many countries including China, India, Mexico, Poland and Ukraine. African Union Commission has developed a UNFC-based African Mineral and Energy Resources Classification and Management System (AMREC) as a unifying system for Africa. AMREC includes a Pan African Resource Reporting Code (PARC 2023). European Commission is using UNFC to classify and report raw material resources of Europe and mandated the same in the Critical Raw Materials Act.

== See also ==
- United Nations Resource Management System
