= Distributed practice =

Learning strategy

Distributed practice (also known as spaced repetition, the spacing effect, or spaced practice) is a learning strategy, where practice is broken up into a number of short sessions over a longer period of time. Humans and other animals learn items in a list more effectively when they are studied in several sessions spread out over a long period of time, rather than studied repeatedly in a short period of time, a phenomenon called the spacing effect. The opposite, massed practice, consists of fewer, longer training sessions and is generally a less effective method of learning. For example, when studying for an exam, dispersing your studying more frequently over a larger period of time will result in more effective learning than intense study the night before.

== History ==
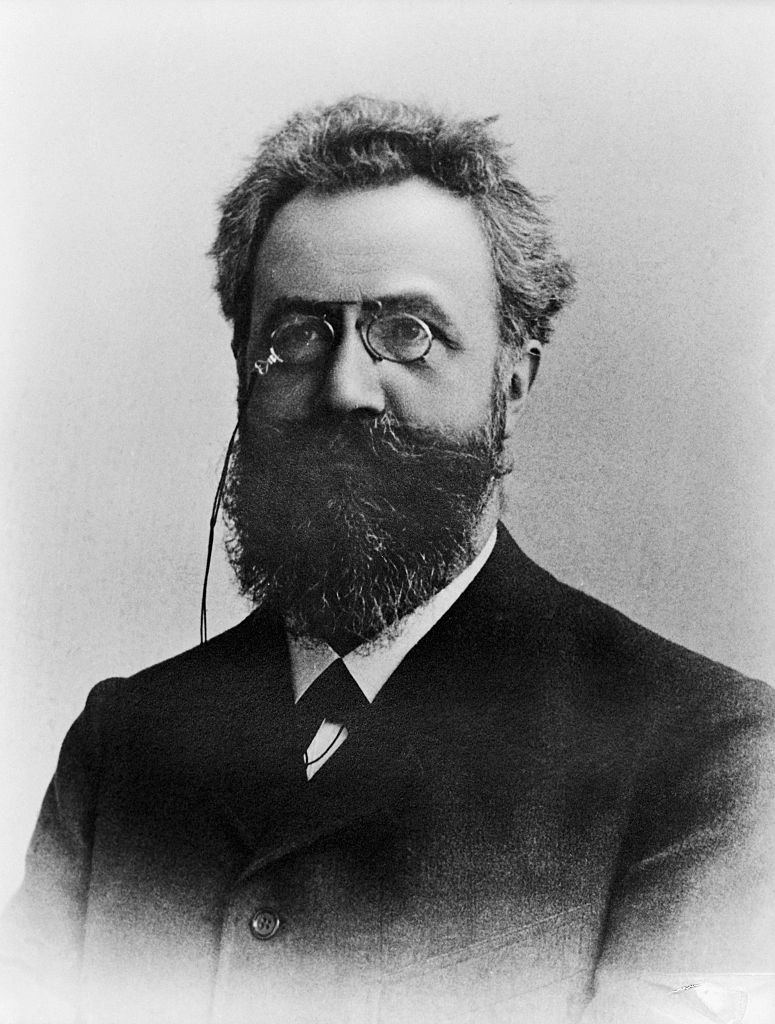
Hermann Ebbinghaus

Influential German psychologist Hermann Ebbinghaus first observed the effect of distributed learning, and published his findings in Memory: A Contribution to Experimental Psychology. Using himself as a subject, Ebbinghaus studied lists of nonsense syllables to control for confounding variables such as prior knowledge, allowing him to discover the spacing effect and serial position effect.

A more recent study that researched the effects of distributed practice was done by Alan Baddeley and Longman in 1978. They researched the effectiveness of distributed practice by teaching postmen how to type using a new system on a typewriter and comparing massed and spaced learning schedules. Baddeley found that although massed practice would seem a more effective learning method because the participants would be able to learn the material in fewer days, the postmen who were taught using shorter sessions stretched over multiple days learned the material better than those who had the longer training sessions. Those who learned how to type with shorter learning sessions, spaced over more days ended up with more accurate and quicker typing.

== Methodology ==
Multiple psychological functions are responsible for the beneficial effects of distributed practice. The most prevalent of these are procedural learning, priming effects, and expanding retrieval.

=== Procedural learning ===
Procedural learning is the act of repeating a complex activity over and over again, until all of the relevant neural systems work together to automatically produce the activity. Distributed practice is the most efficient method of procedural learning. By equally distributing the amount of practice of a given activity over a period of time, you will increase the efficiency of learning that skill.

=== Priming ===
Priming is an effect where an initial (often brief) exposure to a stimulus influences its subsequent recall or perception. This effect is most notable when dealing with semantic knowledge, but is also applicable to the acquisition of general skills. With regards to distributed practice, increasing the amount of practice when learning will result in an increased priming effect for subsequent practice sessions. This causes an increase in memory recall, which is equivalent to an increase in learning. This helps explain why equally distributing your practice sessions, rather than massing them into one session, allows for greater learning.

=== Expanding rehearsal ===
Expanding rehearsal refers to a learning schedule wherein items are initially tested after a short delay, with pre-test delay gradually increasing across subsequent trials. This phenomenon relies on the strength of the consolidated memory in order to efficiently increase success and learning. Memories that were poorly consolidated through inefficient means of practice will be harder to recall, and will reduce the learning achieved through expanding retrieval. Distributed practice directly influences the efficiency of expanding recall, as it provides the strongest basis for memory consolidation, from which to draw needed information.

== Theories ==
=== Free recall and cued-memory tasks ===
Different theories explain the spacing effect in free recall and in explicit cued-memory tasks. Robert Greene proposed a two-factor account of the spacing effect. The spacing effect in free recall tasks is accounted for by the study-phase retrieval account. Because free recall is sensitive to contextual associations, spaced items benefit from additional encoding of contextual information. Thus, the second occurrence of an item in a list reminds the learner of the first occurrence of the same item and of the contextual features surrounding that item. When items are distributed, different contextual information is encoded with each presentation, whereas for massed items, the difference in context is relatively small. This leads to more retrieval cues being encoded with spaced than with massed items, leading to improved recall.

Cued-memory tasks (for example, recognition memory, and frequency estimation tasks) rely more on item information and less on contextual information. Greene proposed that the spacing effect is due to the increased amount of voluntary rehearsal of spaced items. This is supported by findings that the spacing effect is not found when items are studied through incidental learning.

=== Semantic analysis and priming ===
Research has also shown reliable spacing effects in cued recall tasks under incidental learning conditions, where semantic analysis is encouraged through orienting tasks. Bradford Challis found a spacing effect for target words after the words were incidentally analyzed semantically. However, no spacing effect was found when the target words were shallowly encoded using a graphemic study task. This suggests that semantic priming underlies the spacing effect in cued-memory tasks.

When items are presented in a massed fashion, the first occurrence of the target to be memorized, semantically primes the mental representation of that target, such that when the second occurrence appears directly after the first, there is a reduction in its semantic processing. Semantic priming wears off after a period of time, which is why there is less semantic priming of the second occurrence of a spaced item. Thus, on the semantic priming account, the second presentation is more strongly primed, and receives less semantic processing when the repetitions are massed, compared to when presentations are spaced over short lags. This semantic priming mechanism provides spaced words with more extensive processing than massed words, producing the spacing effect.

=== Implications with nonsense stimuli ===
From this explanation of the spacing effect, it follows that this effect should not occur with nonsense stimuli that do not have a semantic representation in memory. A number of studies have demonstrated that the semantically based, repetition priming approach cannot explain spacing effects in recognition memory for stimuli, such as unfamiliar faces, and non-words that are not amenable to semantic analysis. Cornoldi and Longoni have even found a significant spacing effect in a forced-choice recognition memory task when nonsense shapes were used as target stimuli. Russo proposed that with cued memory of unfamiliar stimuli, a short-term perceptually based repetition priming mechanism supports the spacing effect. When unfamiliar stimuli are used as targets in a cued-memory task, memory relies on the retrieval of structural-perceptual information about the targets. When the items are presented in a massed fashion, the first occurrence primes its second occurrence, leading to reduced perceptual processing of the second presentation. Short-term repetition-priming effects for nonwords are reduced when the lag between prime and target trials is reduced, thus it follows that more extensive perceptual processing is given to the second occurrence of spaced items relative to that given to massed items. Hence, nonsense items with massed presentation receive less extensive perceptual processing than spaced items; thus, the retrieval of those items is impaired in cued-memory tasks.

Congruent with this view, Russo also demonstrated that changing the font in which repeated presentations of nonwords were presented reduced the short-term perceptual priming of those stimuli, especially for massed items. Upon a recognition memory test, there was no spacing effect found for the nonwords presented in different fonts during study. These results support the hypothesis that short-term perceptual priming is the mechanism that supports the spacing effects in cued-memory tasks when unfamiliar stimuli are used as targets.

Furthermore, when the font was changed between repeated presentations of words in the study phase, there was no reduction of the spacing effect. This resistance to the font manipulation is expected with this two-factor account, as semantic processing of words at study determines performance on a later memory test, and the font manipulation is irrelevant to this form of processing.

Mammarella, Russo, & Avons also demonstrated that changing the orientation of faces between repeated presentations served to eliminate the spacing effect. Unfamiliar faces do not have stored representations in memory, thus the spacing effect for these stimuli would be a result of perceptual priming. Changing orientation served to alter the physical appearance of the stimuli, thus reducing the perceptual priming at the second occurrence of the face when presented in a massed fashion. This led to equal memory for faces presented in massed and spaced fashions, hence eliminating the spacing effect.

=== Encoding variability ===
Encoding variability and assumes the benefits of spacing appear because spaced presentations lead to a wider variety of encoded contextual elements. Additionally, the variable encodings are thought to be a direct result of contextual variations which are not present in massed repetitions.

To test the encoding variability theory, Bird, Nicholson and Ringer (1978) presented subjects with word lists that either had massed or spaced repetitions. Subjects were asked to perform various "orienting tasks", tasks which require the subject to make a simple judgement about the list item (i.e. pleasant or unpleasant, active or passive). Subjects either performed the same task for each occurrence of a word or a different task for each occurrence. If the encoding variability theory were true, then different orienting tasks ought to provide variable encoding, even for massed repetitions, resulting in a higher rate of recall for massed repetitions than would be expected. The results showed no such effect, providing strong evidence against the importance of encoding variability.

=== Study-phase retrieval ===
The study-phase retrieval theory has gained a lot of traction recently. This theory assumes that the first presentation of an item is retrieved at the time of the second presentation. This leads to an elaboration of the first memory trace. Massed presentations do not yield advantages because the first trace is active at the time of the second, so it is not retrieved or elaborated on.

== Practical applications ==
=== Advertising ===
The spacing effect and its underlying mechanisms have important applications to the world of advertising. For instance, the spacing effect dictates that it is not an effective advertising strategy to present the same commercial back-to-back (massed repetition). If encoding variability is an important mechanism of the spacing effect, then a good advertising strategy might include a distributed presentation of different versions of the same ad. Appleton-Knapp, Bjork and Wickens (2005) examined the effects of spacing on advertising. They found that spaced repetitions of advertisements are more affected by study-phase retrieval processes than encoding variability. They also found that at long intervals, varying the presentation of a given ad is not effective in producing higher recall rates among subjects (as predicted by variable encoding). Despite this finding, recognition is not affected by variations in an ad at long intervals.

=== Individuals with memory deficits ===
Research shows individuals with traumatic brain injury often suffer memory deficits due to impairment in the acquisition phase. They take far more trials to reach a predetermined learning criterion, but having learned something, their ability to retrieve it is comparable to healthy controls. It is therefore important to aid them in acquiring new skills and memories. Relatively little research has been done examining how learning strategies which benefit healthy people apply to individuals with TBI. Goverover et al. examined the application of the spacing effect in improving functional tasks, such as route learning. Initial performance of the task was better for massed practice, but delayed recall was better for information learned using distributed practice. The longer the delay, the greater the spacing effect. This shows distributed practice has a role in rehabilitation, especially in helping patients with TBI retain new skills.

In clinical settings, using word lists, the spacing effect has proven effective with populations of people with memory deficits, including people with amnesia, multiple sclerosis, and TBI.

=== Long-term retention ===
Not much attention has been given to the study of the spacing effect in long-term retention tests. Shaughnessy found that the spacing effect is not robust for twice-presented items after a 24-hour delay in testing. The spacing effect is present, however, for items presented four or six times and tested after a 24-hour delay. This seems like a strange result and Shaughnessy interprets it as evidence for a multi-factorial account of the spacing effect.

The long-term effects of spacing have also been assessed in the context of learning a foreign language. Bahrick et al. examined the retention of newly learned foreign vocabulary words over a 9-year period, varying both the number of sessions and the space between them. Both the number of relearning sessions and the number of days in between each session have a major impact on retention (the repetition effect and the spacing effect), yet the two variables do not interact with each other. For all three difficulty rankings of the foreign words, recall was highest for the 56-day interval as opposed to a 28-day or a 14-day interval. Additionally, 13 sessions spaced 56 days apart yielded comparable retention to 26 sessions with a 14-day interval. These findings have implications for educational practices. Curricula rarely provide opportunities for periodic retrieval of previously acquired knowledge. Without spaced repetitions, students are more likely to forget foreign language vocabulary.

== Learning systems ==
Distributed learning has been shown to be an effective means to improve learning, and has been applied to many different methods of learning, including the Pimsleur method and the Leitner system.

=== Pimsleur method ===
The Pimsleur method, or Pimsleur language learning system is a language acquisition system developed by Paul Pimsleur which is sold commercially. The Pimsleur method is based on four principles: graduated interval recall, principle of anticipation, core vocabulary, and organic learning. The principle of graduated interval recall is based on the concept of distributed learning, where the learner is presented the information to be learned with gradual increases in the length of time between presentation. It uses the idea that learning can be optimized with a schedule of practice.

=== Leitner ===
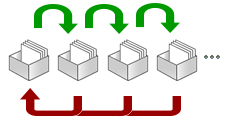

The Leitner system is a widely used method of efficiently using flashcards that was proposed by the German science journalist Sebastian Leitner in the 1970s. It exemplifies the principle of spaced repetition, where cards are reviewed at increasing intervals.

In this method, cards are sorted into separate boxes based on how well you know the material on that card. If you succeed in recalling the answer on the card, it is moved into the next box, and if you fail it is moved into a previous box (if there is one). The further into the chain of boxes a card goes, the longer you must wait before attempting to recall its solution. The Leitner method is another example of studying strategies that take advantage of distributed practice and its associated principles, in this case spaced repetition.

== Anatomy of learning ==
The central biological constructs involved in any kind of learning are those essential to memory formation, particularly those involved with semantic knowledge: the hippocampus and the surrounding Rhinal cortices. Each plays an important role in learning, and therefore in learning techniques such as distributed practice.

=== Hippocampus ===
The hippocampus has long been considered the central hub of all memory, and therefore responsible for a large majority of learning. Located in the ventral-medial temporal area of the brain, its importance regarding the consolidation of new memories, and thus the learning of new things, was demonstrated by the infamous case of HM, a man who had both medial temporal regions of his brain removed. This resulted in his inability to form new long-term memories.

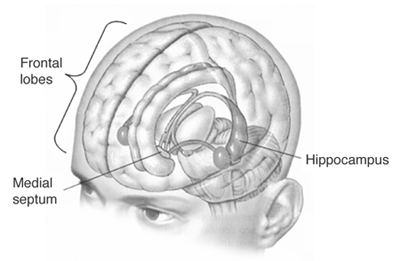
The location of the human hippocampus

Despite the overwhelming evidence provided by HM's case for the centrality of the hippocampus to memory and learning, he was still able to benefit from the effects of distributed practice with regards to certain tasks. During HM's formal assessment, he displayed notable improvement on tasks regarding unconscious learning such as the mirror-drawing test, where the patient must trace a star by watching their hand in a mirror. His improvement in this and other tasks illustrates that the hippocampus is not essential for all forms of learning, including the ability to benefit distributed practice. Without it, however, improvements are limited. For example, he displayed improvement in the Block-Tapping Memory-Span test, but only to a maximum of 5 blocks, implying his ability to improve through practice continued to exist, but that it does not supersede damage to other aspects of long-term memory formation that he suffered after his surgery.

Most famously, H.M. showed what has been termed temporally graded retrograde amnesia, meaning that he lost memories acquired shortly before his lobotomy, but that his amnesia spared remote memories acquired many years before his lobotomy. Distributed reinstatement theory postulates that it isn't the remoteness of the memories that spared them, but rather the repetition and recalling of those memories over the years that strengthened them.

Distributed learning's effectiveness appears to rely more on one's working memory rather than one's ability to form long-term memories. In studies involving the Morris water maze task, rats with hippocampal lesions displaying major reductions in working memory show very little improvement on the test they are working on, despite their supposedly intact ability to form long-term memories. This shows that the effects of practice can be essentially removed through reduction in working memory ability

=== Rhinal cortex ===
The rhinal cortex is an area of the brain surrounding the hippocampus. Multiple animal trials on different species have shown it to be as, if not more important for the existence of multiple different types of memory and learning, than the hippocampus. It is divided into two parts, the perirhinal cortex and the entorhinal cortex. Distributed practice exists to a limited degree in animals after the removal of the hippocampus, if the Rhinal cortices are un-damaged.

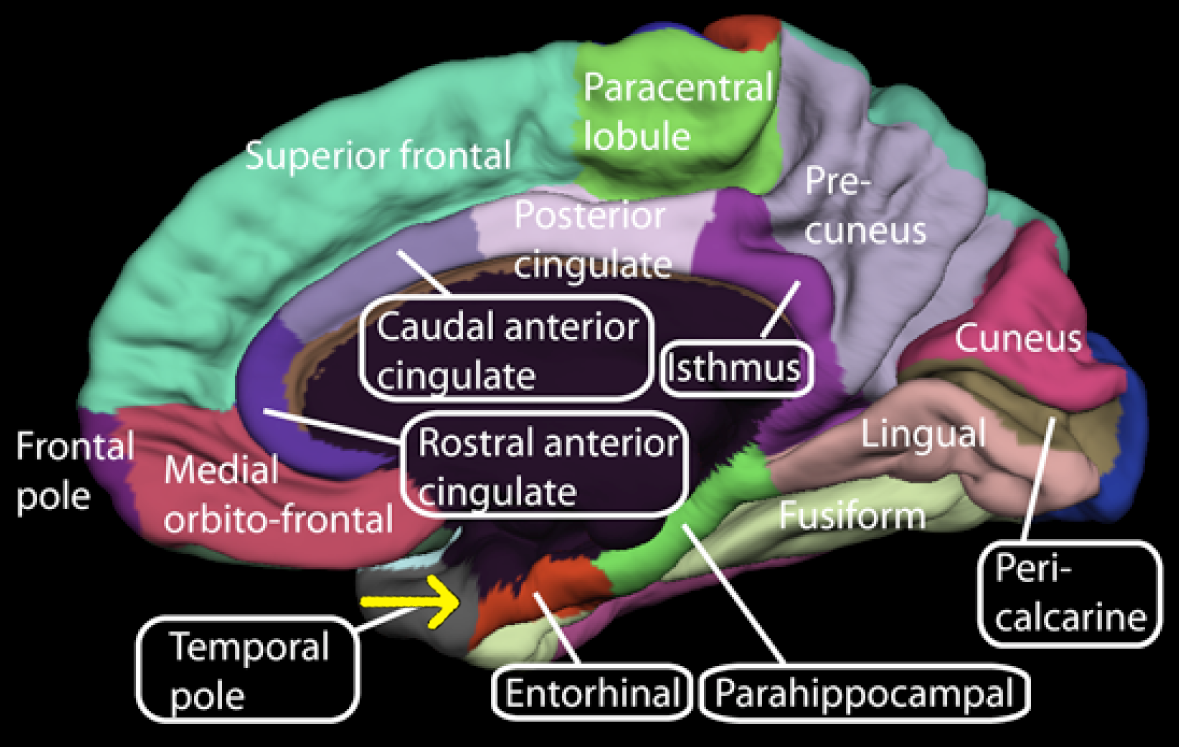
Location of entorhinal cortex in the human brain

In summary, damage to either the hippocampus or the rhinal cortices, which result in memory deficits in different areas, also results in a limitation of the effect of distributed practice on learning and memory consolidation, but never eliminates it. This shows that the ability to improve learning through distributed practice is not wholly dependent on either the hippocampus or the rhinal cortices but is dependent on the interaction between working memory abilities and the ability to form long-term memories, whether semantic or episodic, conscious or subconscious.

== See also ==
- Spaced learning
