= Incremental reading =

Software-assisted learning technique

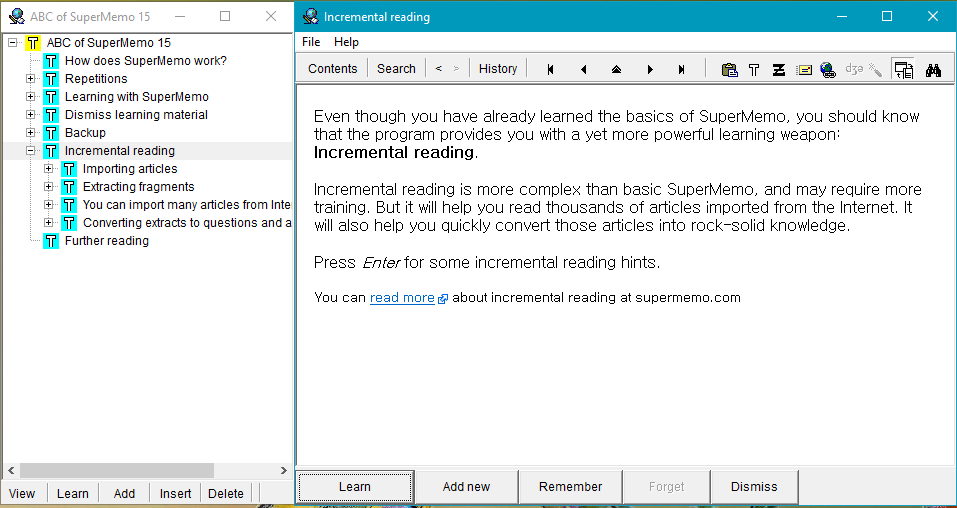
Introduction to incremental reading by SuperMemo 15 Freeware

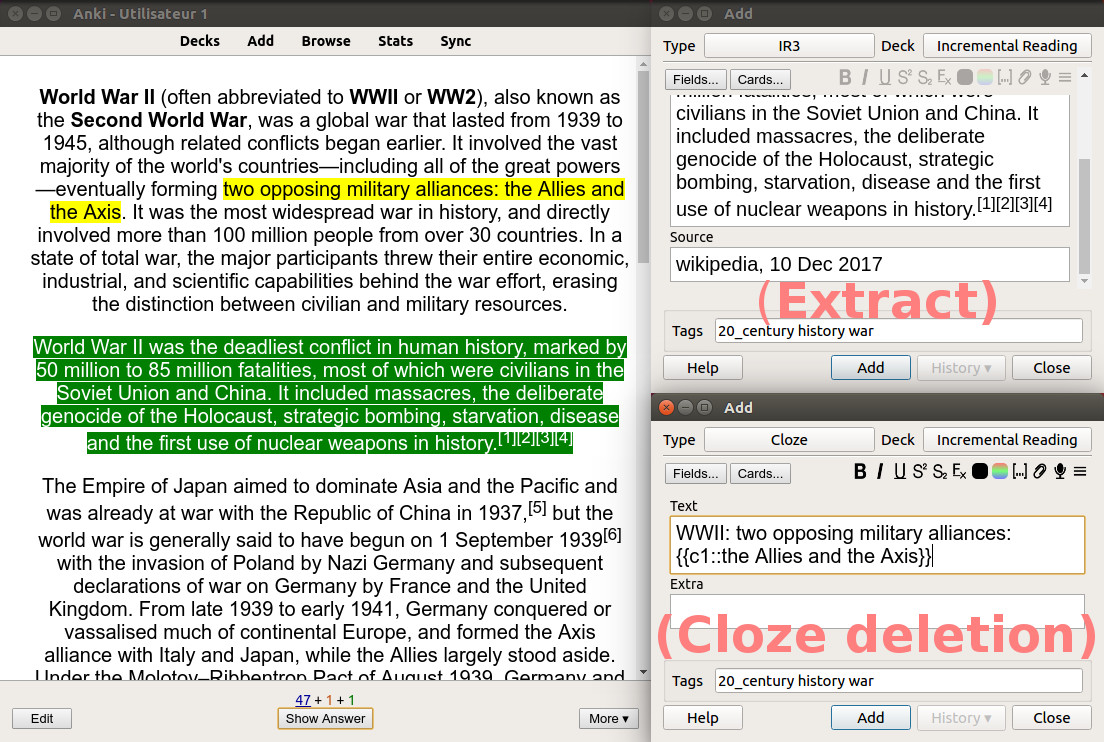
Using incremental reading with an Anki add-on: extracting a portion out of an article and creating a cloze deletion

Incremental reading is a software-assisted method for learning and retaining information from reading, which involves the creation of flashcards out of electronic articles. "Incremental reading" means "reading in portions". Instead of a linear reading of articles one at a time, the method works by keeping a large list of electronic articles or books (often dozens or hundreds) and reading parts of several articles in each session. The user prioritizes articles in the reading list. During reading, key points of articles are broken up into flashcards, which are then learned and reviewed over an extended period with the help of a spaced repetition algorithm.

This use of flashcards at later stages of the process is based on the spacing effect (the phenomenon whereby learning is greater when studying is spread out over time) and the testing effect (the finding that long-term memory is increased when some of the learning periods are devoted to retrieving the to-be-remembered information through testing). It targets people trying to learn for life a large amount of information, particularly if it comes from various sources.

== History ==
The method itself is often credited to the Polish software developer Piotr Woźniak. He implemented the first version of incremental reading in 1999 in SuperMemo 99, providing the essential tools of the method: a prioritized reading list and the possibility to extract portions of articles and to create cloze deletions. The term "incremental reading" itself appeared the following year with SuperMemo 10 (2000). Later SuperMemo programmes subsequently enhanced the tools and techniques involved, such as webpage imports, material overload handling, etc.

Limited incremental reading support for the text editor Emacs appeared in 2007.

An Anki add-on for incremental reading was later published in 2011; for Anki 2.0 and 2.1, another add-on is available.

Incremental reading was the first of a series of related concepts invented by Piotr Woźniak: incremental image learning, incremental video, incremental audio, incremental mail processing, incremental problem solving, and incremental writing. "Incremental learning" is the term Wozniak uses to refer to those concepts.

== Method ==
When reading an electronic article, the user extracts the most important parts (similar to underlining or highlighting a paper article) and gradually distills them into flashcards. Flashcards are information presented in a question-answer format (making active recall possible). Cloze deletions are often used in incremental reading, as they are easy to create from the text. Both extracts and flashcards are scheduled independently from the original article.

With time and reviews, articles are supposed to be gradually converted into extracts and extracts into flashcards. Hence, incremental reading is a method of breaking down information from electronic articles into sets of flashcards.

Contrary to extracts, flashcards are reviewed with active recall. This means that extracts such as "George Washington was the first U.S. president" must ultimately be converted into questions like "Who was the first U.S. president?" (answer: George Washington), or cloze deletions like "[...] was the first U.S. president."

This flashcard creation process is semi-automated – the reader chooses which material to learn and edits the precise wording of the questions. In contrast, the software assists in prioritizing articles and making the flashcards and does the scheduling: it calculates the time for the reader to review each chunk according to the rules of a spaced repetition algorithm. This means that all processed pieces of information are presented at increasing intervals.

Individual articles are read in portions proportional to the attention span, which depends on the user, their mood, the article, etc. This allows for a substantial gain in attention, according to Piotr Wozniak.

Without spaced repetition, the reader would quickly get lost in the glut of information when studying dozens of subjects in parallel. However, spaced repetition makes it possible to retain traces of the processed material in memory.

== See also ==
- Incremental search
