= Mnemosyne (software) =

Spaced repetition software developed in 2003

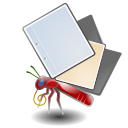
- Developer(s): Peter Bienstman
- Initial release: February 8, 2006; 19 years ago
- Stable release: 2.11 / November 12, 2023; 20 months ago
- Repository: github.com/mnemosyne-proj/mnemosyne
- Written in: Python
- Operating system: Windows, Linux, macOS, Android
- Size: 119.3 MB
- Type: Accelerated Learning & Memory Software
- License: AGPL v3 (except sync client), LGPL v3 (sync client)
- Website: mnemosyne-proj.org

Mnemosyne (named for the Greek goddess of memory, Mnemosyne) is a line of spaced repetition software developed since 2003. Spaced repetition is an evidence-based learning technique that has been shown to increase the rate of memorization.

== Features ==
- Spacing algorithm based on an early version of the SuperMemo algorithm, SM-2, with some modifications that deal with early and late repetitions.
- Supports pictures, sound, video, HTML, Flash and LaTeX
- Portable (can be installed on a USB stick)
- Categorization of cards
- Learning progress statistics
- Stores learning data (represented as decks of cards that each have a question and an answer side) in ".mem" database files, which are interoperable with a number of other spaced repetition applications
- Plugins and JavaScript support
- Review cards on Android devices.
- Synchronization between other machines

== Overview ==
Each day, the software displays each card that is scheduled for repetition. The user then grades their recollection of the card's answer on a scale of 0–5. The software then schedules the next repetition of the card in accordance with the user's rating of that particular card and the database of cards as a whole. This produces an active, rather than passive, review process. The rationale behind this approach is that (because of the spacing effect), over time, the number of repetitions done per day is reduced, increasing the rate of recall (when compared to passive learning techniques), with minimal time spent learning.

== Software ==
Mnemosyne is written in Python, which allows its use on Microsoft Windows, Linux, and Mac OS X. A client program for review on Android devices is also available but needs to be synchronized by the desktop program. Users of the software usually make their own database of cards, although pre-made Mnemosyne databases are available, and it is possible to import SuperMemo collections and text files. SQLite is used by the program to store files. Imports of flashcard databases from Anki, as well as databases from older versions of Mnemosyne are possible.

== Research ==
Mnemosyne collects data from volunteering users and is a research project on long-term memory.

An August 2009 version of the dataset was made available via BitTorrent; a January 2014 version is available for download. Otherwise, the latest version is available from the author, Peter Bienstman, upon request.

== See also ==
- Anki
- List of flashcard software
