= Cloze test =

"Fill-in-the-blank" language learning technique

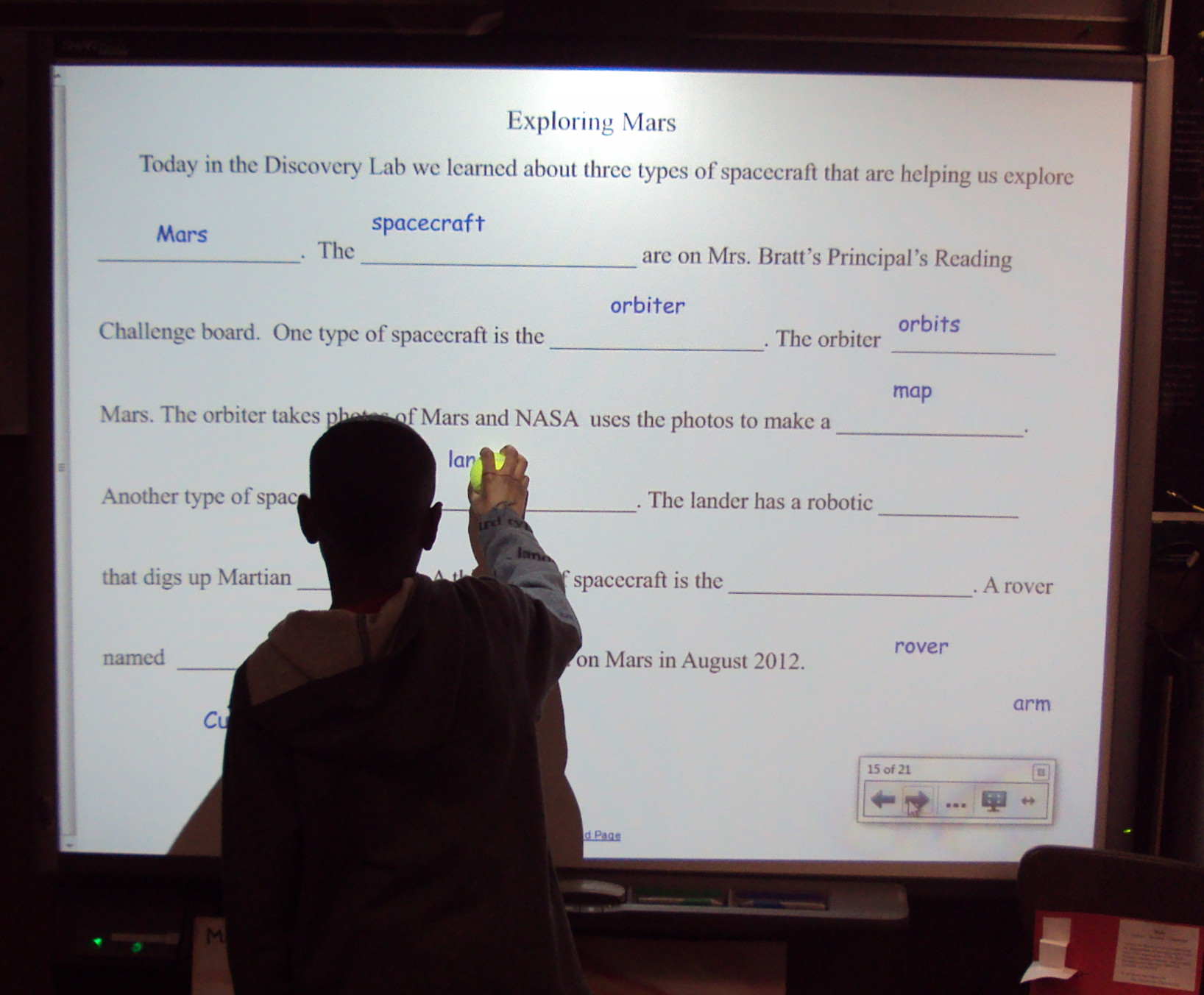
A student dragging terms on a smartboard to fill cloze text

A cloze test (also cloze deletion test or occlusion test) is an exercise, test, or assessment in which a portion of text is masked and the participant is asked to fill in the masked portion of text. Cloze tests require the ability to understand the context and vocabulary in order to identify the correct language or part of speech that belongs in the deleted passages. This exercise is commonly administered for the assessment of native and second language learning and instruction.

The word cloze is derived from closure in Gestalt theory. The exercise was first described by Wilson L. Taylor in 1953.

Words may be deleted from the text in question either mechanically (every nth word) or selectively, depending on exactly what aspect it is intended to test for. The methodology is the subject of extensive academic literature; nonetheless, teachers commonly devise ad hoc tests.

== Examples ==
A language teacher may give the following passage to students:

Today, I went to the ___________ and bought some milk and eggs. I knew it was going to rain, but I forgot to take my ________, and ended up getting wet on the way.

Students would then be required to fill in the blanks with words that would best complete the passage. The context in language and content terms is essential in most, if not all, cloze tests. The first blank is preceded by "the"; therefore, a noun, an adjective or an adverb must follow. However, a conjunction follows the blank; the sentence would not be grammatically correct if anything other than a noun were in the blank. The words "milk and eggs" are important for deciding which noun to put in the blank; "supermarket" is a possible answer; depending on the student, however, the first blank could be store, supermarket, shop, shops, market, or grocer while umbrella, brolly or raincoat could fit the second. A possible completed passage would be:

Today, I went to the supermarket and bought some milk and eggs. I knew it was going to rain, but I forgot to take my umbrella and ended up getting wet on the way.

Besides use for testing linguistic fluency, a cloze test may also be used for testing factual knowledge, for example:

________ is the anaerobic catabolism of glucose.

Possible answers would then include lactic acid fermentation, anaerobic glycolysis, and anaerobic respiration.

== Assessment ==
The definition of success in a given cloze test varies, depending on the broader goals behind the exercise. Assessment may depend on whether the exercise is objective (i.e. students are given a list of words to use in a cloze) or subjective (i.e. students are to fill in a cloze with words that would make a given sentence grammatically correct).

I saw a man lay his jacket on a puddle for a woman crossing the street. I thought that was very ______.

Given the above passage, students' answers may then vary depending on their vocabulary skills and their personal opinions. However, the placement of the blank at the end of the sentence restricts the possible words that may complete the sentence; following an adverb and finishing the sentence, the word is most likely an adjective. Romantic, chivalrous or gallant may, for example, occupy the blank, as well as foolish or cheesy. Using those answers, a teacher may ask students to reflect on the opinions drawn from the given cloze.

Recent research using eye-tracking has posited that cloze/gapfill items where a selection of words are given as options may be testing different kinds of reading skills depending on the language abilities of the participants taking the test. Lower ability test takers are suggested to be more likely to be concentrating on the information contained in the words immediately surrounding the gap, while higher ability test takers are thought to be able to use a wider context window, which is also true for more capable large language models, such as ChatGPT, in contrast to less able older models.

A number of the methodological problems pointed out by researchers regarding the open-ended type cloze item (readers must supply a correct word from long-term memory, how to score acceptable responses that are not the exact replacement, etc.) can be solved by the use of carefully designed multiple-choice cloze items. See sample test and practice activity from a pilot study in a rural Latin American community. Mostow and associates also showed how this approach is both practical and informative.

== Implementation ==
In addition to the usage in testing, cloze deletion can be used in learning, particularly language learning, but also learning facts. This may be done manually – for example, by covering sections of a text with paper, or highlighting sections of text with a highlighter, then covering the line with a colored ruler in the complementary color (say, a red ruler for a green highlighter) so the highlighted text disappears; this is popular in Japan, for instance. Cloze deletion can also be used as part of spaced repetition software. For example the SuperMemo and Anki applications feature semi-automated creation of cloze tests.

Programming software to accept all synonyms of a word as valid correct answers to a cloze test is a challenge, as all potential synonyms must be considered. An important concept that applies during the automatic creation of cloze tests by software is word clozability. Word clozability is defined as: "How often do participants who know this word guess it correctly when it is clozed in a sentence that they haven't seen before?"

Words that have a large amount of synonyms will have a low word clozability score as the likelihood that the given word will be guessed correctly is reduced. Words that are specific and have a low amount of synonyms will have a high clozability score.

Cloze deletion can also be applied to a graphic organizer, wherein a diagram, map, grid, or image is presented and contextual clues must be used to fill in some labels. In particular, when learning an image-heavy subject, such as anatomy, a user of Anki may employ an image occlusion to occlude parts of an image.

== Comparison to other testing methodologies ==
Glover compared different forms of recall and their effectiveness after time passed for forgetting to occur. He referred to cloze tests as cued recall, which was found to be less effective than free recall testing (generic cue was given to pupil, the pupil was expected to recall all they knew), but more effective than recognition tests.

== Natural language processing ==
Cloze test is often used as an evaluation task in natural language processing (NLP) to assess the performance of the trained language models. The tasks have a few different variants, like predicting the answer for the blank with and without providing the right options, predicting the ending sentence of a story or passage, etc. Since the design of the BERT encoder, it is also used in pre-training language models, in which case it is known as masked language modelling.

== See also ==
- Communicative competence
- English language learning and teaching
- Form letter
- Mad Libs
- Sentence completion tests

== More Information ==
- Hanzeli, Victor E. (May 1977). "The Effectiveness of Cloze Tests in Measuring the Competence of Students of French in an Academic Setting". The French Review. 50 (6): 865–874. JSTOR 389444.
- McCray, Gareth; Brunfaut, Tineke (November 2016). "Investigating the Construct Measured by Banked Gap-fill Items: Evidence from Eye-tracking". Language Testing. 35: 51–73. doi:10.1177/0265532216677105.
