= Overlearning =

Practicing newly acquired skills beyond the point of initial mastery

Overlearning refers to practicing newly acquired skills beyond the point of initial mastery. The term is also often used to refer to the pedagogical theory that this form of practice leads to automaticity or other beneficial consequences.

== Early studies ==
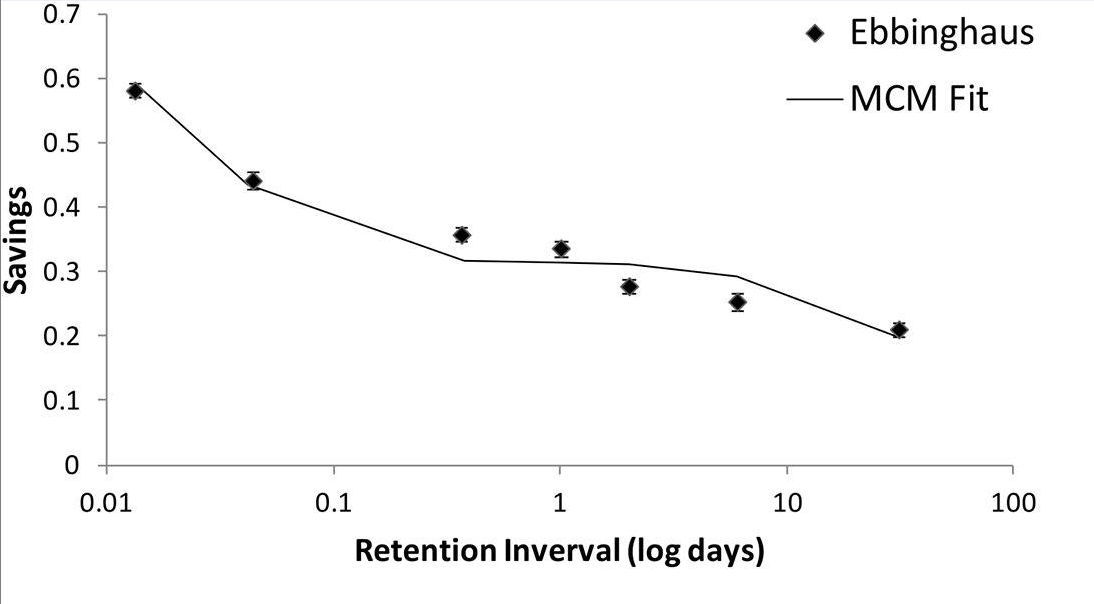
Data from Ebbinghaus showing recall falling over time

Memory researcher Hermann Ebbinghaus performed classical overlearning studies in the late 1890s. He noticed that memory for learned material decreased over time, following the line of a "forgetting curve". Ebbinghaus recognized that lists of nonsense syllables became more difficult to recall over time, and some lists required more review time to regain 100% recall. In subsequent experimental psychology, overlearning has been defined as the number of repetitions carried out after the subject has first achieved 100% accurate recall.

== Contemporary work ==
A 1992 meta-analysis suggested that overlearning does significantly affect recall over time. It also concluded that the size of this effect may be moderated by the amount of overlearning, task type, and length of retention. The meta-analysis included 15 studies. These 15 studies tested overlearning effects on physical and cognitive tasks. Both types of task showed an effect of overlearning. The effect size for physical tasks was smaller than the effect size for cognitive tasks. The amount of overlearning affected retention: more overlearning led to more retention on both types of task. The length of the retention interval also affected overlearning, but the effects were different for physical and cognitive tasks. Whereas participants overlearning physical tasks increased in ability during the retention interval, participants who overlearned cognitive tasks decreased in recall ability over time.

Some recent studies explicitly examined the interaction of overlearning with retention interval, and concluded that the effects of overlearning tend to be fairly short-lived. Overlearning may be more useful in instances when learners only need short-term retention of the material.

=== Overlearning geography facts and word definitions ===
In one study, researchers examined the effects of overlearning geography facts or word definitions. After one week, overlearners recalled more geography facts and word definitions than non-overlearners, but this improvement gradually disappeared after the study. This research suggests that overlearning may be an inefficient study method for long-term retention of geography facts and word definitions. Overlearning improves short-term retention of material, but learners must also spend more time studying. Over time the improvements created by overlearning fade, and the learner is no better off than someone who did not spend time overlearning the material.

=== Overlearning mathematics ===
In another study, researchers compared the effects of overlearning and distributed practice on mathematics knowledge. Distributed practice refers to practice that is spaced over time. In Experiment 1, participants completed 10 math problems either all at once or distributed across two sessions. Participants in the distributed practice condition performed no differently from participants in the single-session condition one week later, but distributed practice participants did perform better than single-session participants four weeks later. In Experiment 2, participants completed either three or nine practice problems in one sitting. When participants were retested one or four weeks later, no differences were found between three-problem and nine-problem participants. Researchers found no effect of overlearning on mathematics retention.

== See also ==
- Spaced repetition
- Educational technology – Use of technology in education to enhance learning and teaching
- Muscle memory – Consolidating a motor task into memory through repetition
