= StoryChopsticks =

Language-learning platform

- Company type: Private
- Headquarters: Singapore
- Owner: Sistero Private Limited
- Founders: Sun Yuanxin, Chuang Wan Ting; Kelvin Quee
- Industry: Language learning, Online education, E-learning, Edtech
- Products: Children's literature, Flashcard
- Website: storychopsticks.com
- Launched: 3 May 2020; 6 years ago

StoryChopsticks
- Chinese: 故事筷子
Transcriptions
Standard Mandarin
- Hanyu Pinyin: Gùshìkuàizi

StoryChopsticks is a Singapore-based language-learning platform that helps children learn languages, most notably Chinese. The platform creates storybooks, drawing books, flashcards, and toys to help children break down foreign languages into small building blocks.

StoryChopsticks was launched on 3 May 2020 by Sun Yuanxin, Chuang Wan Ting and Kelvin Quee.

== Concept ==
StoryChopsticks makes building blocks for children to use to help them create stories in new languages. Like structures built with Lego, the platform allows children to pick up new words and sentence structures, and put them in different contexts as they create their own story. Young learners follow the process of storytelling, keywords recall, speaking, creating their own stories, drawing, and writing to learn the foreign language in the context of stories.
