= Yabla =

Language-learning company

Yabla Inc. is an online computer-assisted language learning (CALL) company featuring interactive videos of various difficulty levels and genres (including television dramas, music videos, animation, interviews, and grammar/vocabulary lessons). Yabla is currently available in Spanish, French, Italian, German, Mandarin Chinese, and English. Based in New York, NY, Yabla was incorporated in 2001 and began accepting subscribers to its French and Spanish sites in 2005. Its customer base is mainly composed of native English speakers from the United States, Canada, Great Britain, and Australia.

== Yabla player ==
The interactive Yabla video player includes dual-language captions that can be independently displayed or hidden according to the user’s preference. Users can also click on a word in the captions to view its definition in an integrated dictionary tool and add it to a list of flashcards. The Yabla player also includes pitch-corrected slow play, which allows users to slow down the speech in each caption. A vocabulary review exercise and a cloze-based listening game provide further opportunities for user interaction.

== Video content and sources ==
Yabla videos feature native speakers, and the majority are licensed from third parties, such as Telefe in Argentina, RAI in Italy, and rheinmaintv in Germany, with additional videos produced by the company. All licensed material features authentic content, or content that is produced specifically for native speakers. Yabla’s interactive, multimodal features act as “mediators” between the user and the native speakers in the videos, thus offering an immersive approach to language learning. The Yabla player was the first of its kind in the CALL field to offer mediated, user-controlled access to authentic content.

== Subscribers and educational partners ==
Yabla offers a subscription-based service geared toward individuals, high schools, universities, and other organizations. Yabla subscribers have included such institutions as the U.S. Military Academy, the U.S. State Department, and the University of Michigan. Institutions have the option of tailoring Yabla features and content to their specific needs. Recently, Yabla supplied videos and technology to the McGraw-Hill university Spanish textbook Dos Mundos.

== Iowa State University study ==
A study on LoMásTv (the former name of the Yabla Spanish site) was conducted by Cristina Pardo-Ballester of Iowa State University, focusing on the use of the website in the university’s intermediate Spanish courses.
