= Spaced learning =

Spaced learning is a learning method in which highly condensed learning content is repeated three times, with two 10-minute breaks during which distractor activities such as physical activities are performed by the students. It is based on the temporal pattern of stimuli for creating long-term memories reported by R. Douglas Fields in Scientific American in 2005. This 'temporal code' Fields used in his experiments was developed into a learning method for creating long-term memories by Paul Kelley, who led a team of teachers and scientists as reported in Making Minds in 2008.

A paper on the method has been published in Frontiers in Human Neuroscience. This makes a substantial scientific case for this approach to learning based on research over many years in different species. The distinctive features of the approach are made clear: the speed of instruction being minutes (as opposed to hours, days or months), the spaces and their function, and why content is repeated three times. Spaced learning has been reported in other species as being required for long-term memory creation, a finding that gives considerable weight to its use in education.

== Background ==
Spaced Learning had been developed by Kelley and his team over years and rather confusingly was not called 'Spaced Learning' at first. Earlier descriptions of Spaced Learning often led to its being misunderstood, and the scientific origins of the approach ignored. When the initial reports of outcomes were made public, media seized upon the condensed learning content as the key element in the approach used and the BBC national television news, The Sunday Times, The Independent, and The Economist reported the approach largely in those terms ('8 minute lessons'). This emphasis was misplaced, since Spaced Learning as a method depends on the length and number of the spaces (Fields' 'temporal code'), not the content presentation (which can vary). However, this misunderstanding was also included in reports in the educational press, notably The Times Educational Supplement.

The description of the approach as 'Spaced Learning', clarifying the importance of the spaces, only appeared later. Additional research reported in The Times Educational Supplement, The Guardian, The Times, and The Daily Telegraph on 30 January 2009 reported that Spaced Learning successfully prepared students for a national examination in less than two hours with no traditional teaching at all.

The use of the term 'spaced' reflects the distinction in other research between 'spaced training' and 'massed training' where there have been conflicting results reported (for example, see spaced repetition). Spaced retrieval practice – trying to recover long-term memories quickly and accurately – is the subject of a different line of research but also shows that spaced practice (for example, taking a practice test every month) is more effective than massed practice.

The significance of Spaced Learning may prove important in different ways:

1. as a demonstration that neuroscience is now producing outcomes that can be directly implemented in education – as asserted by Kelley. This seems established now through the academic paper in Frontiers in Human Neuroscience
2. as a demonstration that primary neuroscientific research can demonstrate processes that have not been used in formal education, yet are of fundamental importance in the learning process
