= Julius Ebbinghaus =

German philosopher

Julius Ebbinghaus (9 November 1885, Berlin – 16 June 1981, Marburg an der Lahn) was a German philosopher, one of the closest followers of Immanuel Kant active in the twentieth century. He was influenced by the Heidelberg school of neo-Kantianism of Wilhelm Windelband and wrote on the philosophy of law and the categorical imperative. He took on the title of Professor at Marburg University (Philipps-Universität Marburg) in 1940. In 1954, he became professor emeritus while continuing lectures until 1966. In October 1945, he became installed as Rector Magnificus by order of the American occupation forces.

He was the son of famous psychologist Hermann Ebbinghaus.
