= Thea Leitner =

Austrian author and journalist

Thea Leitner (June 2, 1921 in Vienna – August 2016) was an Austrian author and journalist. She has written numerous books for young people and was decorated, in May, 2003 for service to Vienna with the "Silbernes Ehrenzeichen für Verdienste um das Land Wien" (the Silver Order of Merit for Service to Vienna).

She was the wife of German commentator and science popularizer Sebastian Leitner with whom she lived in Vienna until his death in 1989.

She died on Tuesday, August 9, 2016 in Vienna.

== Bibliography ==
- Körner aus der Nähe. 1951
- Das Bilderbuch vom Bauernhof. ISBN 3-219-10315-4
- Habsburgs verkaufte Töchter. 1987, ISBN 3-8000-3248-1, ISBN 978-3-8000-3248-8
- Schicksale im Hause Habsburg. 2003, ISBN 3-492-23980-3
- Habsburgs Goldene Bräute. Durch Mitgift zur Macht. 2003, ISBN 3-492-23525-5
- Hühnerstall und Nobelball. Leben in Krieg und Frieden 1938-1955. 2003, ISBN 3-8000-3927-3 (autobiographical)
