= Forgetting curve =

Decline of memory retention in time

A representation of the forgetting curve showing retained information halving after each day

The Ebbinghaus forgetting curve measures the decline of memory retention across time, showing how information is lost when there is no attempt to retain it. A related concept is the strength of memory that refers to the durability that memory traces in the brain. The stronger the memory, the longer period of time that a person is able to recall it. A typical graph of the forgetting curve purports to show that humans tend to halve their memory of newly learned knowledge in a matter of days or weeks unless they consciously review the learned material.

The forgetting curve supports one of the seven kinds of memory failure discussed in The Seven Sins of Memory: transience, which is the process of forgetting what occurs with the passage of time.

== History ==
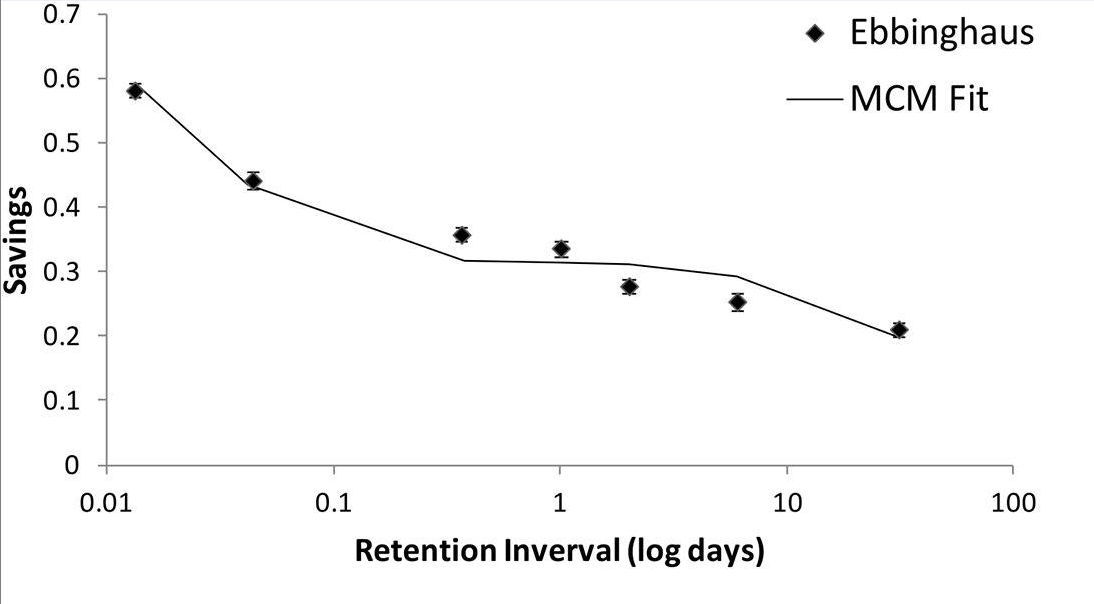
The forgetting curve, with original data from Ebbinghaus

From 1880 to 1885, Hermann Ebbinghaus ran a limited, incomplete study on himself and published his hypothesis in 1885 as Über das Gedächtnis (later translated into English as Memory: A Contribution to Experimental Psychology). Ebbinghaus studied the memorisation of nonsense syllables, such as "WID" and "ZOF" (CVCs or Consonant–Vowel–Consonant) by repeatedly testing himself after various time periods and recording the results. He plotted these results on a graph creating what is now known as the "forgetting curve". Ebbinghaus investigated the rate of forgetting, but not the effect of spaced repetition on the increase in retrievability of memories.

Ebbinghaus's publication also included an equation to approximate his forgetting curve:

$$b = \frac{100k}{(\log(t))^c +k}$$

Here, $b$ represents 'Savings' expressed as a percentage, and $t$ represents time in minutes, counting from one minute before end of learning. The constants c and k are 1.25 and 1.84 respectively. Savings is defined as the relative amount of time saved on the second learning trial as a result of having had the first. A savings of 100% would indicate that all items were still known from the first trial. A 75% savings would mean that relearning missed items required 25% as long as the original learning session (to learn all items). 'Savings' is thus, analogous to retention rate.

In 2015, an attempt to replicate the forgetting curve with one study subject has shown the experimental results similar to Ebbinghaus's original data.

Ebbinghaus's experiment has significantly contributed to experimental psychology. He was the first to carry out a series of well-designed experiments on the subject of forgetting, and he was one of the first to choose artificial stimuli in the research of experimental psychology. Since his introduction of nonsense syllables, a large number of experiments in experimental psychology has been based on highly controlled artificial stimuli.

== Increasing rate of learning ==
Hermann Ebbinghaus hypothesized that the speed of forgetting depends on a number of factors such as the difficulty of the learned material (e.g. how meaningful it is), its representation and other physiological factors such as stress and sleep. He further hypothesized that the basic forgetting rate differs little between individuals. He concluded that the difference in performance can be explained by mnemonic representation skills.

He went on to hypothesize that basic training in mnemonic techniques can help overcome those differences in part. He asserted that the best methods for increasing the strength of memory are:

1. better memory representation (e.g. with mnemonic techniques)
2. repetition based on active recall (especially spaced repetition).

Forgetting Curve with Spaced Repetition

His premise was that each repetition in learning increases the optimum interval before the next repetition is needed (for near-perfect retention, initial repetitions may need to be made within days, but later they can be made after years). He discovered that information is easier to recall when it's built upon things you already know, and the forgetting curve was flattened by every repetition. It appeared that by applying frequent training in learning, the information was solidified by repeated recalling.

Later research also suggested that, other than the two factors Ebbinghaus proposed, higher original learning would also produce slower forgetting. The more information was originally learned, the slower the forgetting rate would be.

Spending time each day to remember information will greatly decrease the effects of the forgetting curve. Some learning consultants claim reviewing material in the first 24 hours after learning information is the optimum time to actively recall the content and reset the forgetting curve. Evidence suggests waiting 10–20% of the time towards when the information will be needed is the optimum time for a single review.

Some memories remain free from the detrimental effects of interference and do not necessarily follow the typical forgetting curve as various noise and outside factors influence what information would be remembered. There is debate among supporters of the hypothesis about the shape of the curve for events and facts that are more significant to the subject. Some supporters, for example, suggest that memories of shocking events such as the Kennedy Assassination or 9/11 are vividly imprinted in memory (flashbulb memory). Others have compared contemporaneous written recollections with recollections recorded years later, and found considerable variations as the subject's memory incorporates after-acquired information. There is considerable research in this area as it relates to eyewitness identification testimony, and eyewitness accounts are found demonstrably unreliable.

== Equations ==
Many equations have since been proposed to approximate forgetting, perhaps the simplest being an exponential curve described by the equation

$$R = e^{-\frac{t}{S}},$$

where $R$ is retrievability (a measure of how easy it is to retrieve a piece of information from memory), $S$ is stability of memory (determines how fast $R$ falls over time in the absence of training, testing or other recall), and $t$ is time.

Simple equations such as this one were not found to provide a good fit to the available data.

== See also ==
- Atrophy – Partial or complete wasting away of a part of the body
- Learning curve – Relationship between proficiency and experience
- Overlearning – Practicing newly acquired skills beyond the point of initial mastery
- Spacing effect
- Spaced repetition – Learning technique performed with flashcards
