= Flashcard =

Tool for systematic learning

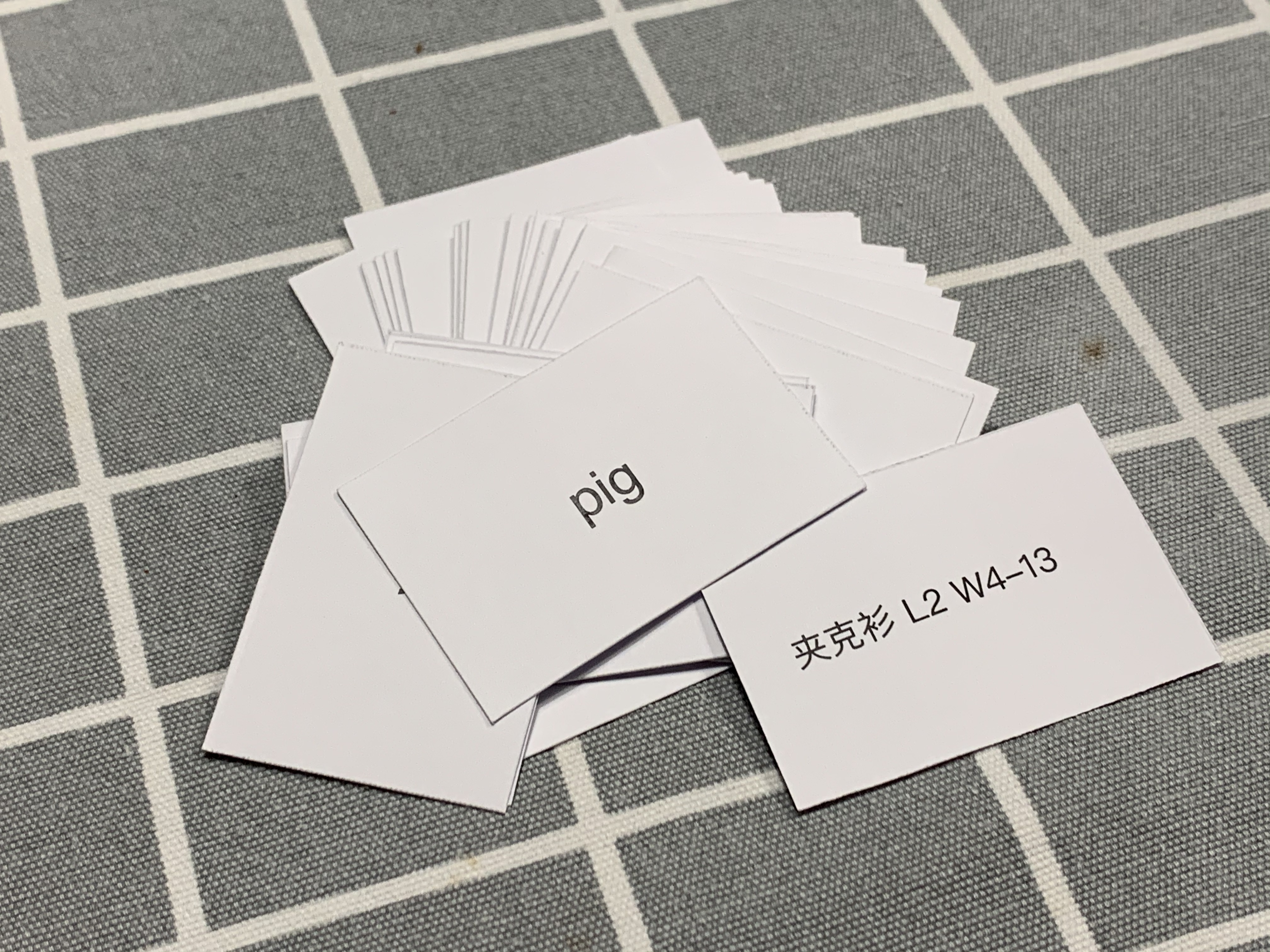
Physical flashcards with Chinese words on one side and English on the other, for learning a language

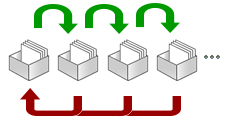
A set of flashcards demonstrating the Leitner system. Cards that the learner knows are promoted to a box for less frequent review (indicated by green arrows); cards for which the learner has forgotten the meaning are demoted to be studied more frequently (indicated by red arrows).

A flashcard or flash card is a card bearing information on both sides, usually intended to practice and/or aid memorization. It can be virtual (part of a flashcard software) or physical.

Typically, each flashcard bears a question or definition on one side and an answer or target term on the other. As such, flashcards are often used to memorize vocabulary, historical dates, formulae, or any subject matter that can be learned via a question-and-answer format.

Flashcards are an application of the testing effect, the finding that long-term memory is increased when some part of an individual's learning period is devoted to retrieving information through testing with proper feedback. Study habits affect the rate at which a flashcard user learns, and proper spacing of flashcards has been proven to accelerate learning.

== Format ==
=== Two-sided cards ===
Physical flashcards are two-sided. They have a number of uses and can be simple or elaborate depending on the user's needs and preferences. One may also use two parallel decks in tandem, such as an English-Japanese deck in conjunction with a Japanese-English deck.

==== Example ====
An English-speaking student learning the Chinese word 人 (rén 'person' or 'people') may write a card with the following sides.

Front:

Q: person
A: 人, rén

Reverse:

Q: 人
A: rén, person

=== Three-sided cards ===
Electronic flashcards may have a three-sided card. Such a card has three fields, Q, A, and A*, where Q & A are reversed on flipping, but A* is always in the answer—the two "sides" are thus Q/A,A* and A/Q,A*. These are most often used for learning foreign vocabulary, where the foreign pronunciation is not transparent from the foreign writing. In this case, the question (Q) is the native word, the answer (A) is the foreign word (written), and the pronunciation is always part of the answer (A*). This is particularly the case for character-based languages like Chinese hanzi and Japanese kanji, but it can also be used for other non-phonetic spellings such as English as a second language.

The purpose of three-sided cards is to provide the benefits of two-sided cards—ease of authoring (enter data once to create two cards), synchronized updates (changes to one are reflected in the other), and spacing between opposite sides (so opposite sides of the same card are not tested too close together)—without the card needing to be symmetric. It is analogous to an arbitrary number of data fields associated with a single record, with each field representing a different aspect of a fact or bundle of facts.

== Psychology ==
Flashcards specifically exercise the mental process of active recall: given a question, one must produce the correct answer. However, many have raised several questions regarding optimal usage of flashcards: how does one precisely use them, how frequently does one review, and how does one react to errors, either complete failures to recall or partial mistakes? Various systems have been developed, mostly based around spaced repetition, the technique of increasing time intervals between reviews whenever a card is recalled correctly.

=== Spaced repetition ===
Spaced repetition is an evidence-based learning technique which incorporates increasing time intervals between each review of a flashcard in order to harness the spacing effect.

Newly introduced and more difficult flashcards are shown more frequently, whereas older and less difficult flashcards are shown less frequently. The use of spaced repetition has been shown to generally increase one's rate of learning. Although the principle is useful in many contexts, spaced repetition is commonly applied in contexts in which a learner must memorize a large number of items and retain them in long-term memory. It is therefore often used in vocabulary acquisition amidst second language learning. Additionally, spaced repetition software has been developed to aid the learning process through a virtual format as opposed to merely a physical one.

==== Leitner system ====
In the Leitner system, correctly answered cards are advanced to the next, less frequent box, while incorrectly answered cards return to the first box for more aggressive review and repetition.

The Leitner system is a widely used method of efficiently using flashcards. Originally proposed by the German science journalist Sebastian Leitner in the 1970s, it is a simple implementation of the principle of spaced repetition where cards are reviewed at increasing intervals.

In this method, flashcards are sorted into groups according to how well the learner knows each one in the Leitner's learning box. The learners then try to recall the solution written on a flashcard. If they succeed, they send the card to the next group. If they fail, they send it back to the first group. Each succeeding group has a longer period of time before the learner is required to revisit the cards. In Leitner's original method published in his book So lernt man Lernen (How to learn to learn), the schedule of repetition was governed by the size of the five partitions in the learning box, which were 1, 2, 5, 8, and 14 centimetres (0.4, 0.8, 2.0, 3.1, and 5.5 in), respectively. The learner only reviewed some of the cards in a section whenever it became full, subsequently moving them forward or backward depending on whether they remembered them.

==== Software ====
Example of a virtual flashcard: using flashcard software Anki to review a mathematical formula. First, only the question is displayed. Then the answer is displayed too, for verification.

There is a wide range of software, including open source and online services, available for creating and using virtual flashcards as a learning aid.

== History ==
Todd Pruzan claimed that a set of illustrations in Reading Disentangled (1834) by the English educator Favell Lee Mortimer represents the earliest known use of flashcards, although the book itself does not mention any such use. Instead, it instructs the teacher or child to point to the illustration or the word on the page. A single-sided hornbook was also known to have been used for early literacy education.

The Leitner system for scheduling flashcards was introduced by German scientific journalist Sebastian Leitner in the 1970s with his book, So lernt man lernen. Later, the SuperMemo program and algorithm (specifically the SM-2 algorithm, which is the most popular in other programs) was introduced in 1987 by Polish researcher Piotr Woźniak.
