= Piotr Woźniak (researcher) =

Polish researcher (born 1962)

- Born: March 1962 (age 63); Milanówek, Poland
- Known for: SuperMemo

Academic background
- Education: Adam Mickiewicz University in Poznań (MS); Poznań University of Technology (MS); Wrocław University of Economics (PhD)
- Thesis: Economics of Learning: New Aspects in Designing Modern Computer Aided Self-Instruction Systems (1995)
- Doctoral advisor: Witold Abramowicz
- Website: supermemo.guru

Piotr A. Woźniak (Polish pronunciation: [pjɔtr ˈvɔʑɲak]; born 1962) is a Polish researcher best known for his work on SuperMemo, a learning system based on spaced repetition.

== Life ==
Woźniak was born in March 1962 in Milanówek, Poland.

He began to develop his spaced-repetition software after struggling to retain course material as a student at the Poznań University of Technology in the 1980s.

He received a doctorate from the Wrocław University of Economics in 1995. His doctoral dissertation was entitled Economics of Learning: New Aspects in Designing Modern Computer Aided Self-Instruction Systems.

He prefers anonymity as it allows him to focus on his learning without distraction.

== Interests and ideas ==
In addition to the theory of spaced repetition, Woźniak's research interests include incremental reading and the optimization of sleep.

He has written extensively about the failure of schooling, believing that learning needs to be driven by the natural "learn drive".

He supports the idea of a single international auxiliary language, and for two years kept a diary in Esperanto.

== Partial bibliography ==
- Woźniak, Piotr A.; Biedalak, Krzysztof (1992). "The SuperMemo Method: Optimization of Learning". Informatyka. 10: 1–9.
- Woźniak, Piotr A.; Gorzelanczyk, Edward J. (1994). "Optimization of Repetition Spacing in the Practice of Learning". Acta Neurobiologiae Experimentalis. 54: 59–62. PMID 8023714.
