= Corsi block-tapping test =

Psychological test of working memory

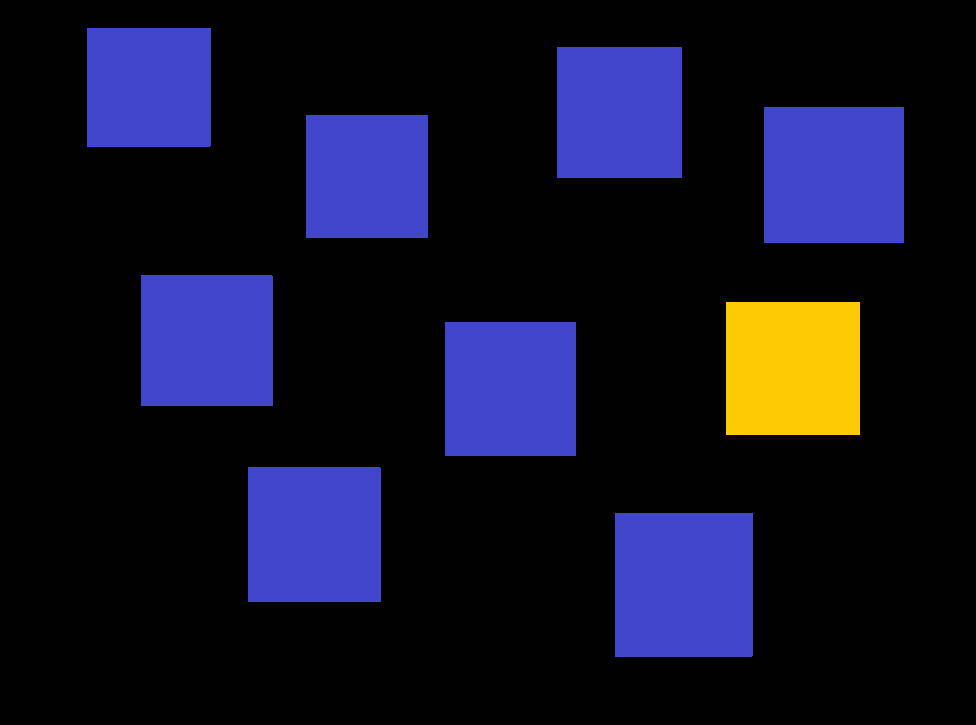
- This is an example of the computer version of the task. The yellow symbolizes the current block in the sequence.
- Purpose: Assesses visuo-spatial short term working memory

The Corsi block-tapping test is a psychological test that assesses visuo-spatial short term working memory. It involves mimicking a researcher as they tap a sequence of up to nine identical spatially separated blocks. The sequence starts out simple, usually using two blocks, but becomes more complex until the subject's performance suffers. This number is known as the Corsi Span, and average is about 5–6 for typically 'normal' human subjects.

== History ==
The Corsi block tapping task originated in the early 1970s as a set of 9 identical wooden blocks positioned on a board. The subject was required to point at the blocks in the order they were presented, or "tapped". It was based on the digit span task, but instead of the verbal form of the Digit Span, it required the use of visuo-spatial memory.

== Process ==
This number is known as the Corsi Span, and average is about 5–6 for normal human subjects. An fMRI study involving subjects undergoing this test revealed that while the sequence length increases, general brain activity remains the same. So while humans may show encoding difficulty, this is not related to overall brain activation. Whether able to perform the task well or not the ventrolateral prefrontal cortex is highly involved. Corsi blocks tasks with a normal forward order requires support from the visuospatial sketch pad, but not from the phonological loop. When the sequence to be recalled becomes longer than three or four items, central executive resources are used.

=== Uses ===
The Corsi block tapping task is used to test a variety of things including memory loss, testing of brain damaged patients, spatial memory, and nonverbal working memory.

=== Backward Corsi block tapping ===
The backward Corsi block tapping is a slightly altered version of the original Corsi block tapping task. In the backward task, the subjects are asked to watch the sequence and instead of mimicking the researcher's pattern, they are asked to repeat the sequence in backward order.

Although the format of the forward and backward Corsi block test are analogous to the forward and backward forms of the digit span task (which tests verbal memory span rather than visuo-spatial memory span), the backward Corsi block tapping test differs from the backwards digit span task in its relative difficulty. For example, in a study done on the Corsi block tapping task and the digit span task both forward and backward, researchers found that although the backward version of the digit span task was significantly harder than the forward, there was no significant difference between the forward and backwards version of the Corsi block tapping task.

The backward Corsi block tapping task has also been used in studying the differences in the processes used between the Digit Span forward and backward and the Corsi block tapping forward and backward. In a study with visuospatial learning disabled (VSLD) children, they found that only the VSLD children had significantly impaired performance on the Corsi backward task as compared to the forward, while both the control group and the VSLD group showed poor performance on the digit span backward compared to the forward. This indicates that the backward Corsi block tapping uses specific spatial processes.
