= Anki =

Free and open-source flashcard program

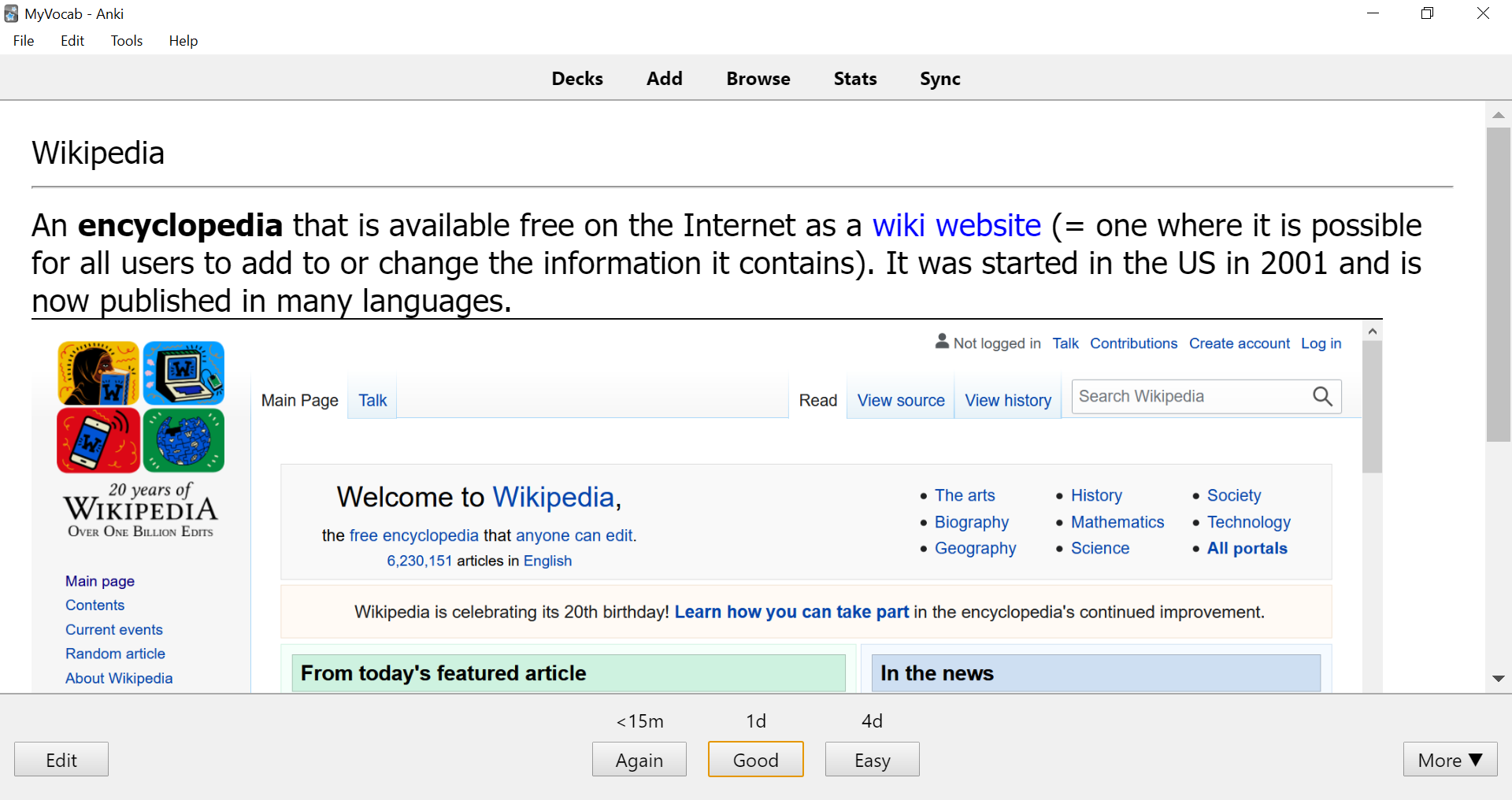
- Anki 2.1.6
- Developer: Damien Elmes
- Release: 5 October 2006; 20 years ago
- Stable release: 26.09.4 / 4 November 2026; 10 days ago
- Written in: Rust, Python, TypeScript, Svelte, among others
- Operating system: Windows, macOS, Linux, FreeBSD; Android and iOS (special versions)
- Available in: 52 (desktop)/25 (AnkiMobile) languages
- List of languages: Desktop: Afrikaans, Arabic, Armenian, Basque, Belarusian, Bulgarian, Catalan, Simplified Chinese, Traditional Chinese, Croatian, Czech, Danish, Dutch, English (United Kingdom), English (United States), Esperanto, Estonian, Finnish, French, Galician, German, Greek, Hebrew, Hungarian, Irish, Italian, Japanese, Korean, Latin, Lojban, Malay, Mongolian, Norwegian, Occitan, Odia, Persian, Polish, Portuguese, Brazilian Portuguese, Romanian, Russian, Serbian, Slovak, Slovenian, Spanish, Swedish, Thai, Turkish, Ukrainian, Urdu, Uyghur, Vietnamese; AnkiMobile: English, Arabic, Belarusian, Catalan, Czech, Finnish, French, German, Hebrew, Irish, Italian, Japanese, Korean, Malayalam, Oriya, Persian, Polish, Portuguese, Romanian, Russian, Simplified Chinese, Spanish, Traditional Chinese, Turkish, Vietnamese
- Type: Flashcard; Spaced repetition
- License: Desktop: GNU AGPL v3+; Android: GNU GPL v3
- Website: apps.ankiweb.net
- Repository: github.com/ankitects/anki

Anki is a free and open-source flashcard program. It uses techniques from cognitive science such as active recall testing and spaced repetition to aid the user in memorization. The name comes from the Japanese word for "memorization" (暗記, anki; Japanese: [aŋʲ.kʲi]).

The SM-2 algorithm, created for SuperMemo in the late 1980s, has historically formed the basis of the spaced repetition methods employed in the program. Anki's implementation of the algorithm has been modified to allow priorities on cards and to show flashcards in order of their urgency. Anki 23.10 and later also have a native implementation of the Free Spaced Repetition Scheduler (FSRS) algorithm, which allows for more efficient spacing of card repetitions.

Anki is content-agnostic, and the cards are presented using HTML and may include text, images, sounds, videos, and LaTeX equations. The decks of cards, along with the user's statistics, are stored in the open SQLite format.

== Features ==
=== Notes ===
In Anki, cards are generated from information stored in notes. A note functions as a database record and contains one or more fields, such as an expression, its meaning, audio, or additional context. Notes do not correspond directly to flashcards; instead, the note type determines how many cards are created from the fields and how the information is presented during review. For example, with respect to learning a language, a note may have the following fields and example entries:

- Field 1: Expression in target language – "gâteau"
- Field 2: Pronunciation – [sound file with the word "gâteau" pronounced]
- Field 3: Expression in familiar language – "cake"

From this single note, Anki can generate multiple cards using card templates. One template might test the meaning of the expression, while another tests recognition of the pronunciation. Because all related cards originate from the same note, any correction to a field (such as fixing a spelling error) automatically updates every associated card. Anki also spaces related cards apart to avoid showing closely linked prompts in close succession.

Anki includes a dedicated Cloze note type, which allows the user to create cards through cloze deletion (for example, {{c1::...}}). Each cloze deletion automatically generates a separate card. This system replaces older mechanisms for cloze cards used in early versions of Anki.

=== Syncing ===
Anki supports synchronization with a free and proprietary online service called AnkiWeb. This allows users to keep decks synchronized across multiple computers and to study online or on a cell phone.

There also is a third-party open-source (AGPLv3) AnkiWeb alternative, called anki-sync-server, which users can run on their own local computers or servers.

Anki 2.1.57+ includes a built-in sync server. Advanced users who cannot or do not wish to use AnkiWeb can use this sync server instead of AnkiWeb.

=== Japanese and Chinese reading generation ===
Anki can automatically fill in the reading of Japanese and Chinese text. Since version 0.9.9.8.2, these features are in separate plug-ins.

=== Add-ons ===
More than 1600 add-ons for Anki are available, often written by third-party developers. They provide support for speech synthesis, enhanced user statistics, image occlusion, incremental reading, more efficient editing and creation of cards through batch editing, modifying the GUI, simplifying import of flashcards from other digital sources, adding an element of gamification, etc.

=== Shared decks ===
While Anki's user manual encourages the creation of one's own decks for most material, there is still a large and active database of shared decks that users can download and use.

== Comparisons ==
=== Current algorithms ===
Anki's current scheduling algorithm is derived from SM-2 (an older version of the SuperMemo algorithm), though the algorithm has been significantly changed from SM-2 and is also far more configurable. One of the most apparent differences is that while SuperMemo provides users a 6-point grading system (0 through 5, inclusive), Anki only provides at most 4 grades (again, hard, good, and easy). Anki also has significantly changed how review intervals grow and shrink (making many of these aspects of the scheduler configurable through deck options), though the core algorithm is still based on SM-2's concept of ease factors as the primary mechanism of evolving card review intervals.

In 2023 (version 23.10) the Free Spaced Repetition Scheduler (FSRS), a new scheduling algorithm, was integrated into Anki as an optional feature.

FSRS is based on a variant of the DSR (Difficulty, Stability, Retrievability) model, which is used to predict memory states. The default FSRS parameters are based on about 727 million reviews from 10 thousand users and are more accurate in comparison to the standard SM2 algorithm, according to benchmarks, leading to fewer necessary reviews for the same retention rate.

=== Other algorithms ===
Anki was originally based on the SM-5 algorithm, but the implementation was found to have seemingly incorrect behaviour (harder cards would have their intervals grow more quickly than easier cards in certain circumstances) leading the authors to switch Anki's algorithm to SM-2 (which was further evolved into the modern Anki algorithm). At the time, this led Elmes to claim that SM-5 and later algorithms were flawed which was strongly rebutted by Piotr Woźniak, the author of SuperMemo. Since then, Elmes has clarified that it is possible that the flaw was due to a bug in their implementation of SM-5 (the SuperMemo website does not describe SM-5 in complete detail), but added that due to licensing requirements, Anki will not use any newer versions of the SuperMemo algorithm. The prospect of community-funded licensing of newer SuperMemo algorithms is often discussed among users. However, there exists a greater focus on the development of the software itself and its features. The latest version of the SuperMemo algorithm is SM-20, released in 2026.

Some Anki users who have experimented with the Anki algorithm and its settings have published configuration recommendations, made add-ons to modify Anki's algorithm, or developed their own separate software.

== Mobile versions ==
The following smartphone/tablet and Web clients are available as companions to the desktop version:

- AnkiMobile for iPhone, iPod Touch or iPad (paid)
- AnkiWeb (online server, free to use; includes add-on and deck hosting)
- AnkiDroid for Android (free of charge, under GPLv3; by Nicolas Raoul)

The flashcards and learning progress can be synchronized both ways with Anki using AnkiWeb. With AnkiDroid it is possible to have the flashcards read in several languages using text-to-speech (TTS). If a language does not exist in the Android TTS engine (e.g. Russian in the Android version Ice Cream Sandwich), a different TTS engine such as SVOX TTS Classic can be used.

== History ==
Damien Elmes, the Australian programmer behind the app, originally created it for learning Japanese. The oldest mention of Anki that the developer Damien Elmes could find in 2011 was dated 5 October 2006, which was thus declared Anki's birthdate.

- Version 2.0 was released on 6 October 2012.
- Version 2.1 was released on 6 August 2018.
- Version 23.10 was released on 31 October 2023, changing the version numbering scheme to year.month.
- Version 23.12 was released on 24 December 2023.
- Version 24.04 was released 31 March 2024.
- Version 24.06 was released 6 June 2024.

In 2026, Damien announced he would be gradually transitioning business operations and open source stewardship to AnkiHub.

== Utility ==
While Anki may primarily be used for language learning or a classroom setting, many have reported other uses for Anki: scientist Michael Nielsen uses it to remember complex topics in a fast-moving field, while others are using it to remember memorable quotes, the faces of business partners or medical residents, or to remember business interviewing strategies.

In 2010, Roger Craig obtained the then-all-time record for single-day winnings on the quiz show Jeopardy! after using Anki to memorize a vast number of facts.

=== Medical education ===
A study in 2015 at Washington University School of Medicine found that 31% of students who responded to a medical education survey reported using Anki as a study resource; the same study found a positive relationship between the number of unique Anki cards studied and USMLE Step 1 scores in a multivariate analysis. In the same year, another study showed that students had a one-point increase on their licensing exams for every 1,700 unique Anki flashcards they used.

Another study in 2024 found that Anki was commonly used among American medical students. 86.2% of surveyed students reported some Anki use and 66.5% used it daily. AnKing, an Anki deck developed by students at the University of Utah School of Medicine aggregates information from multiple third-party resources and has become the primary method of USMLE Step1 and Step2 study for many students, having been downloaded over 300,000 times as of 2024.

=== App selections ===
Anki offers user-made decks, which are commonly used in medical education and for learning a range of subjects including Chemistry, Biology, Geography, History, Law, Mathematics, Music, and Physics. User-made decks are also available for learning languages such as Albanian, Arabic, Chinese, Croatian, English, French, German, Hebrew, Japanese, Korean, Russian, and Spanish.

== See also ==
- List of flashcard software
- Computer-assisted language learning
