= Victor Hanzeli =

American linguist (1925–1991)

Victor Egon Hanzeli Sr. (1925 – April 23, 1991) was an American linguist and professor of Romance Languages and Literature at the University of Washington. His pioneering 1969 book, Missionary Linguistics in New France, is considered the best in its field. He spoke five languages.

== Early life and education ==
Victor Hanzeli was born in Hungary in 1925. He started his academic studies at the University of Vienna and went on to graduate from the University of Budapest.

In 1947, Hanzeli moved to France, and in 1951 he moved to the United States. He continued his studies at Indiana University Bloomington where received his doctorate in French literature and linguistics. His 1961 dissertation is titled Early descriptions by French missionaries of Algonquian and Iroquoian languages: A study of seventeenth- and eighteenth-century practice in linguistics.

== Career ==
Hanzeli joined the University of Washington faculty in 1957. He was active in University affairs and over the course of his career, served in several different roles in addition to teaching.

For five years he served as Chair of the Department of Romance Languages and Literature. He also served as Director of the Washington Foreign Language Program and coauthored a report to the Ford Foundation on it. In addition to these academic roles, he was also President of the university's chapter of the American Association of University Professors and served as faculty representative to the Washington State Legislature.

Hanzeli was one of only a few academics (the most notable exception being James Axtell) to study role of linguistics in the activities of Catholic and Protestant missionaries among Native American populations. His 1969 book, Missionary Linguistics in New France, is considered a pioneering study of missionary linguists in New France. It is still considered the best in the field.

== Personal life ==
Hanzeli married his wife, Eva, sometime before moving to France in 1947. They had five children: Victor Jr., of Marysville, Washington; Beatrice, of Seattle; Tina Hodgins, of Olympia; Dennis, of Brier; and Gabriel, of Kent.

Hanzeli died on April 23, 1991, after a long illness.

== Works ==
=== Dissertation ===
- Hanzeli, Victor (1961). Early descriptions by French missionaries of Algonquian and Iroquoian languages: A study of seventeenth- and eighteenth-century practice in linguistics (PhD dissertation). Bloomington: Indiana University.

=== Articles and contributions ===
- Elliott, A. V. P.; Hanzeli, Victor Egon (1957). Language Teaching in African Schools. Longmans, Green & Company.
- Hanzeli, Victor E. (October 1968). "Linguistics and the Language Teacher". Foreign Language Annals. 2 (1): 42–50. doi:10.1111/j.1944-9720.1968.tb00283.x.
- Hanzeli, Victor E. (January 1971). "Foreign Language Teachers and the 'New' Student: A Review Article". The Modern Language Journal. 55 (1): 15–21. doi:10.1111/j.1540-4781.1971.tb03596.x.
- Hanzeli, Victor E.; William, F.; Love, D. (March 1972). "From Individualized Instruction to Individualized Learning". Foreign Language Annals. 5 (3): 321–330. doi:10.1111/j.1944-9720.1972.tb00696.x.
- Hanzeli, Victor E. (December 1975). "Learner's Language: Implications of Recent Research for Foreign Language Instruction". The Modern Language Journal. 59 (8): 426–432. doi:10.1111/j.1540-4781.1975.tb04724.x.
- Hanzeli, Victor E. (May 1977). "The Effectiveness of Cloze Tests in Measuring the Competence of Students of French in an Academic Setting". The French Review. 50 (6): 865–874. JSTOR 389444.

=== Books ===
- Ristinen, Elaine K.; Hanzeli, Victor Egon (1957). Az Angol Beszélt Nyelv Nyelvkőnyv Magyar Tanulók Számára: Spoken English for Hungarians (in Hungarian). Indiana University.
- Hanzeli, Victor Egon (1969). Missionary Linguistics in New France: a Study of Seventeenth- and Eighteenth-Century Descriptions of American Indian Languages. The Hague: Mouton de Gruyter. ISBN 3110995212.
- Hanzeli, Victor Egon (1973). Readjustment Rules in French Morphophonology. University of Washington. OCLC 500490503.
- Altman, Howard B.; Hanzeli, Victor E., eds. (1974). Essays on the Teaching of Culture: A Festschrift to Honor Howard Lee Nostrand. Detroit, MI: Advancement Press of America. OCLC 1617008.
- Selinker, Larry; Tarone, Elaine; Hanzeli, Victor, eds. (1981). English for Academic and Technical Purposes: Studies in Honor of Louis Trimble. Rowley, MA: Newbury House. ISBN 0883771780.

=== Translations ===
- Gyarmathi, Sámuel (1983). Grammatical Proof of the Affinity of the Hungarian Language with Languages of Fennic Origin. Translated by Hanzeli, Victor. John Benjamins Publishing. ISBN 9027209766.
