= Hermann Ebbinghaus =

German psychologist (1850–1909)

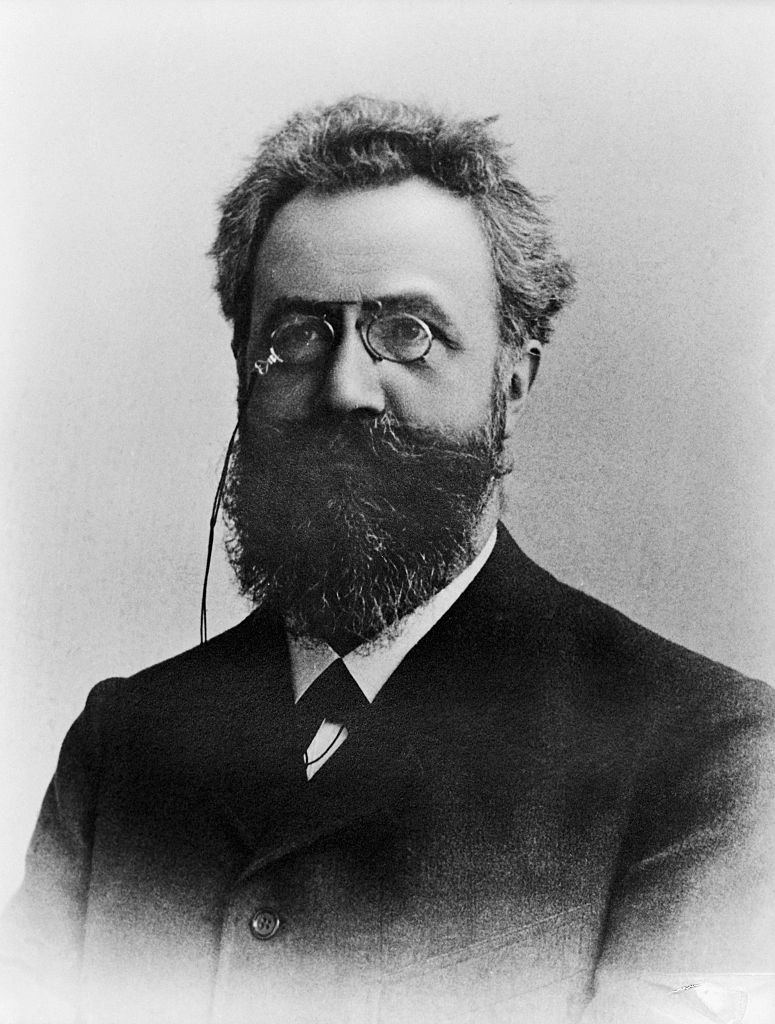
- Born: 24 January 1850; Barmen, Rhine Province, Kingdom of Prussia
- Died: 26 February 1909 (aged 59); Halle, German Empire
- Known for: Serial position effect
- Scientific career
- Fields: Psychology
- Workplaces: University of Berlin; University of Breslau; University of Halle

Hermann Ebbinghaus (24 January 1850 – 26 February 1909) was a German psychologist who pioneered the experimental study of memory. Ebbinghaus discovered the forgetting curve and the spacing effect. He was the first person to describe the learning curve. He was the father of the neo-Kantian philosopher Julius Ebbinghaus.

== Early life ==
Ebbinghaus was born in Barmen, in the Rhine Province of the Kingdom of Prussia, as the son of a wealthy merchant, Carl Ebbinghaus. Little is known about his infancy except that he was brought up in the Lutheran faith and was a pupil at the town Gymnasium. At the age of 17 (1867), he began attending the University of Bonn, where he had planned to study history and philology. However, during his time there he developed an interest in philosophy. In 1870, his studies were interrupted when he served with the Prussian Army in the Franco-Prussian War. Following this short stint in the military, Ebbinghaus finished his dissertation on Eduard von Hartmann's Philosophie des Unbewussten (philosophy of the unconscious) and received his doctorate on 16 August 1873, when he was 23 years old. During the next three years, he spent time at Halle and Berlin.

== Professional career ==
After acquiring his PhD, Ebbinghaus moved around England and France, tutoring students to support himself. In England, he may have taught in two small schools in the south of the country (Gorfein, 1885). In London, in a used bookstore, he came across Gustav Fechner's book Elemente der Psychophysik (Elements of Psychophysics), which spurred him to conduct memory experiments. After beginning his studies at the University of Berlin, he founded the third psychological testing lab in Germany (third to Wilhelm Wundt and Georg Elias Müller). He began his memory studies here in 1879. In 1885 — the same year that he published his monumental work, Über das Gedächtnis. Untersuchungen zur experimentellen Psychologie, later published in English under the title Memory: A Contribution to Experimental Psychology — he was made a professor at the University of Berlin, most likely in recognition of this publication. In 1890, along with Arthur König, he founded the psychological journal Zeitschrift für Physiologie und Psychologie der Sinnesorgane ("The Psychology and Physiology of the Sense Organs'").

In 1894, he was passed over for promotion to head of the philosophy department at Berlin, most likely due to his lack of publications. Instead, Carl Stumpf received the promotion. As a result of this, Ebbinghaus left to join the University of Breslau (now Wrocław, Poland), in a chair left open by Theodor Lipps (who took over Stumpf's position when he moved to Berlin). While in Breslau, he worked on a commission that studied how children's mental ability declined during the school day. While the specifics on how these mental abilities were measured have been lost, the successes achieved by the commission laid the groundwork for future intelligence testing. At Breslau, he again founded a psychological testing laboratory.

In 1902, Ebbinghaus published his next piece of writing entitled Die Grundzüge der Psychologie (Fundamentals of Psychology). It was an instant success and continued to be long after his death. In 1904, he moved to Halle where he spent the last few years of his life. His last published work, Abriss der Psychologie (Outline of Psychology) was published six years later, in 1908. This, too, continued to be a success, being re-released in eight different editions. Shortly after this publication, on 26 February 1909, Ebbinghaus died from pneumonia at the age of 59.

== Research on memory ==
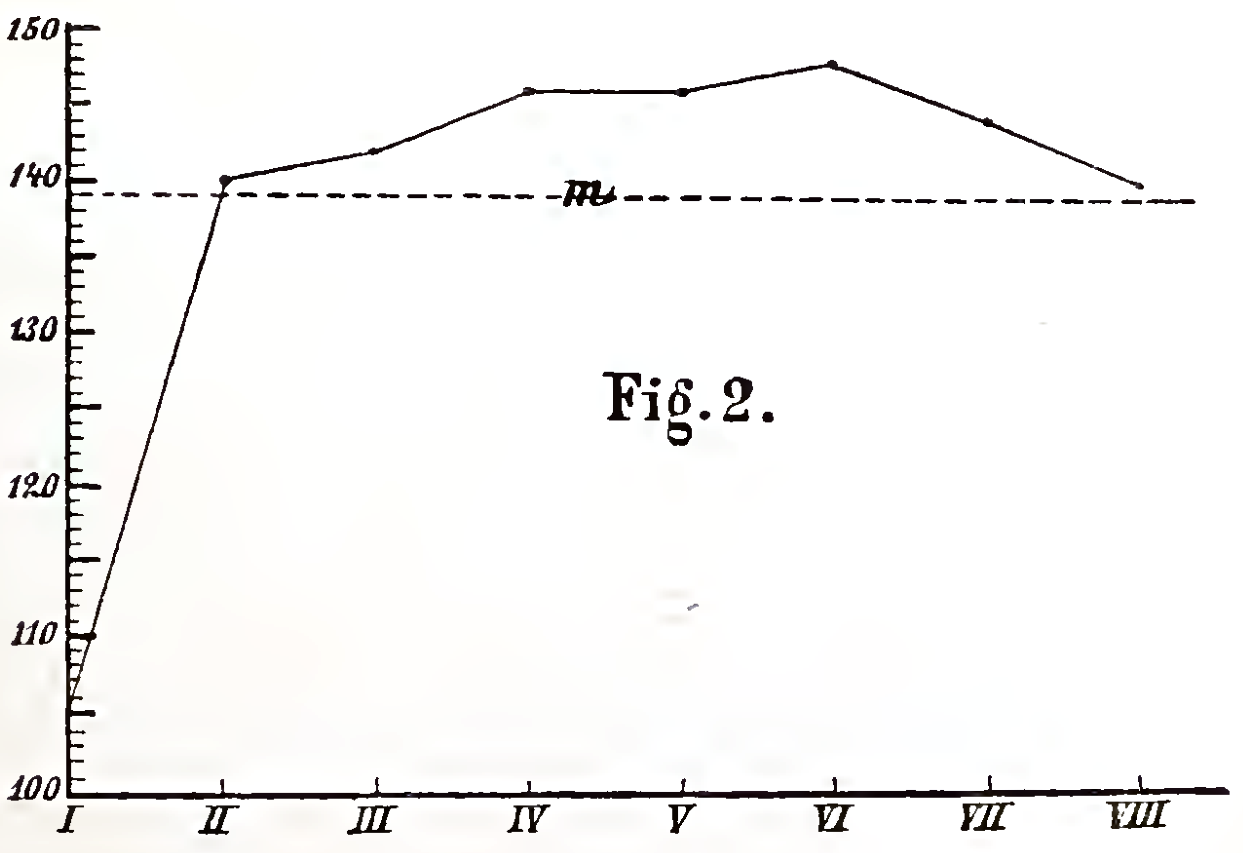
Figure 2 from Ebbinghaus' Über das Gedächtnis. Ebbinghaus ran a series of 92 tests. In each test, he gave the subject 8 blocks of 13 random syllables each, and plotted the average time taken for the subject to memorize the block.

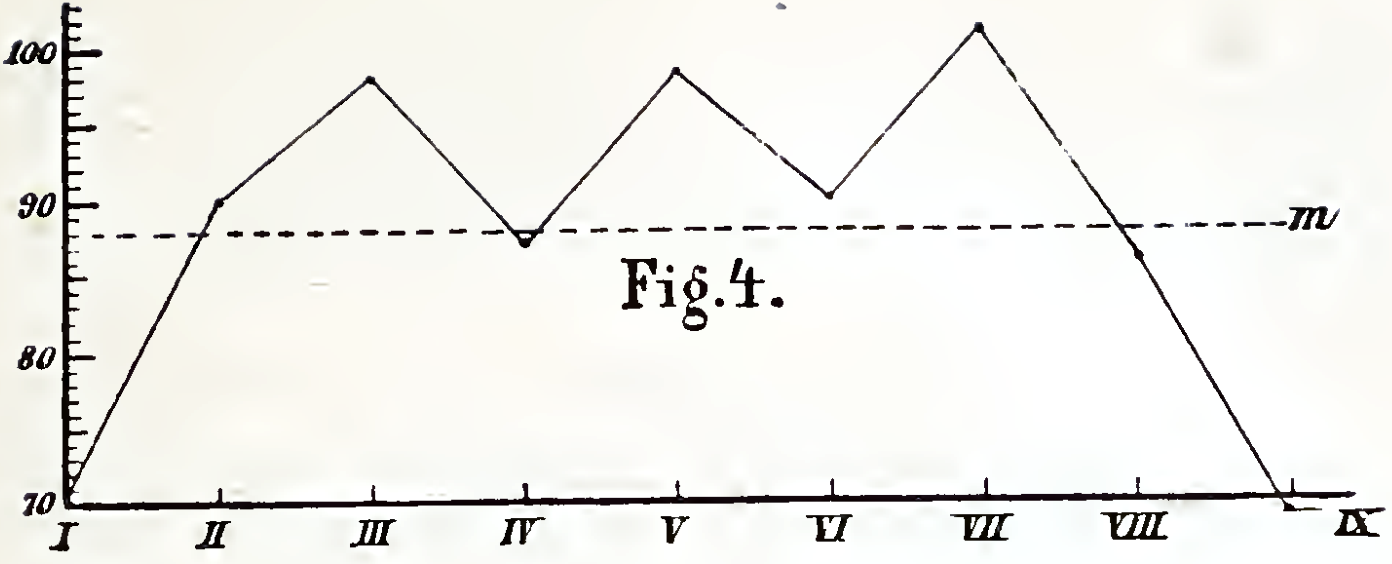
Figure 4 from Über das Gedächtnis. The same test with 9 blocks of 12 syllables each. This shows an oscillating pattern.

Ebbinghaus was determined to show that higher mental processes could actually be studied using experimentation, which was in opposition to the popularly held thought of the time. To control for most potentially confounding variables, Ebbinghaus wanted to use simple acoustic encoding and maintenance rehearsal for which a list of words could have been used. As learning would be affected by prior knowledge and understanding, he needed something that could be easily memorized but which had no prior cognitive associations. Easily formable associations with regular words would interfere with his results, so he used items that would later be called "nonsense syllables" (also known as the CVC trigram). A nonsense syllable is a consonant-vowel-consonant combination, where the consonant does not repeat and the syllable does not have prior meaning. BOL (sounds like "Ball") and DOT (already a word) would then not be allowed. However, syllables such as DAX, BOK, and YAT would all be acceptable (though Ebbinghaus left no examples). After eliminating the meaning-laden syllables, Ebbinghaus ended up with 2,300 resultant syllables. Once he had created his collection of syllables, he would pull out a number of random syllables from a box and then write them down in a notebook. Then, to the regular sound of a metronome, and with the same voice inflection, he would read out the syllables, and attempt to recall them at the end of the procedure. One investigation alone required 15,000 recitations.

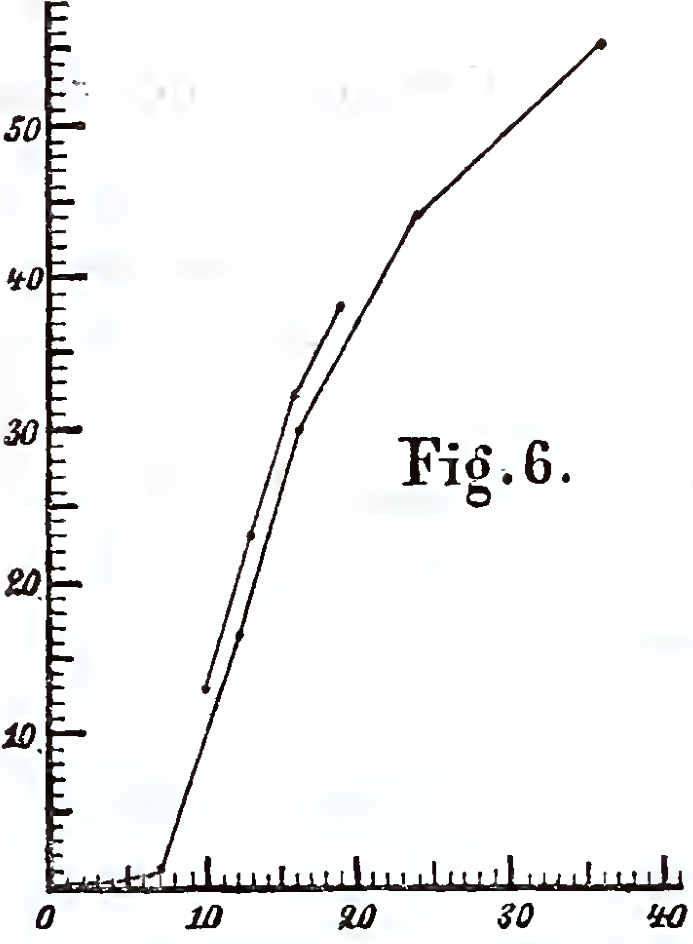
Figure 6 from Über das Gedächtnis. Ebbinghaus found that he could recite 6-8 random syllables correctly after only one reading, but not more than 8. So he studied how many repetitive readings it takes for a subject to memorize more syllables. This is plotted in the graph. The x-axis is number of syllables and the y-axis is the number of required repetitive readings for memorizing.

It was later determined that humans impose meaning even on nonsense syllables to make them more meaningful. The nonsense syllable PED (which is the first three letters of the word "pedal") turns out to be less nonsensical than a syllable such as KOJ; the syllables are said to differ in association value. It appears that Ebbinghaus recognized this, and only referred to the strings of syllables as "nonsense" in that the syllables might be less likely to have a specific meaning and he should make no attempt to make associations with them for easier retrieval.

=== Limitations ===
There are several limitations to his work on memory. The most important one was that Ebbinghaus was the only subject in his study. This limited the study's generalizability to the population. Although he attempted to regulate his daily routine to maintain more control over his results, his decision to avoid the use of participants sacrificed the external validity of the study despite sound internal validity. In addition, although he tried to account for his personal influences, there is an inherent bias when someone serves as researcher as well as participant. Also, Ebbinghaus's memory research halted research in other, more complex matters of memory such as semantic and procedural memory and mnemonics.

=== Contributions ===
In 1885, he published his groundbreaking Über das Gedächtnis ("On Memory", later translated to English as Memory. A Contribution to Experimental Psychology) in which he described experiments he conducted on himself to describe the processes of learning and forgetting.

Ebbinghaus made several findings that are still relevant and supported to this day. First, Ebbinghaus made a set of 2,300 three letter syllables to measure mental associations that helped him find that memory is orderly. Second, and arguably his most famous finding, was the forgetting curve. The forgetting curve describes the exponential loss of information that one has learned. The sharpest decline occurs in the first twenty minutes and the decay is significant through the first hour. The curve levels off after about one day.

A typical representation of the forgetting curve

The learning curve described by Ebbinghaus refers to how fast one learns information. The sharpest increase occurs after the first try and then gradually evens out, meaning that less and less new information is retained after each repetition. Like the forgetting curve, the learning curve is exponential. Ebbinghaus had also documented the serial position effect, which describes how the position of an item affects recall. The two main concepts in the serial position effect are recency and primacy. The recency effect describes the increased recall of the most recent information because it is still in the short-term memory. The primacy effect causes better memory of the first items in a list due to increased rehearsal and commitment to long-term memory.

Another important discovery is that of savings. This refers to the amount of information retained in the subconscious even after this information cannot be consciously accessed. Ebbinghaus would memorize a list of items until perfect recall and then would not access the list until he could no longer recall any of its items. He then would relearn the list, and compare the new learning curve to the learning curve of his previous memorization of the list. The second list was generally memorized faster, and this difference between the two learning curves is what Ebbinghaus called "savings". Ebbinghaus also described the difference between involuntary and voluntary memory, the former occurring "with apparent spontaneity and without any act of the will" and the latter being brought "into consciousness by an exertion of the will".

Prior to Ebbinghaus, most contributions to the study of memory were undertaken by philosophers and centered on observational description and speculation. For example, Immanuel Kant simply described recognition and its components. On the other hand, Sir Francis Bacon claimed that the simple observation of the rote recollection of a previously learned list wasn't useful to understanding memory. This dichotomy between descriptive and experimental study of memory would resonate later in Ebbinghaus's life, particularly in his public argument with former colleague Wilhelm Dilthey. However, more than a century before Ebbinghaus, Johann Andreas Segner invented the "Segner-wheel" and would use both by seeing how fast a wheel with a hot coal attached had to move for the red ember circle from the coal to appear complete (see iconic memory). He proceeded to view the length of the after images.

Ebbinghaus's effect on memory research was almost immediate. With very few works published on memory in the previous two millennia, Ebbinghaus's works spurred memory research in the United States in the 1890s, with 32 papers published in 1894 alone. This research was coupled with the growing development of mechanized mnemometers (an outdated mechanical device used for presenting a series of stimuli to be memorized).

The reaction to his work in his day was mostly positive. Psychologist William James called the studies "heroic" and said that they were "the single most brilliant investigation in the history of psychology". Edward B. Titchener also mentioned that the studies were the greatest undertaking in the topic of memory since Aristotle.

== Research on cramming ==
Ebbinghaus is the first person to compare distributed learning to cramming and one of the first people to carry out research on cramming.

== Sentence completion, illusion and research report standardization ==
Ebbinghaus pioneered sentence completion exercises, which he developed in studying the abilities of schoolchildren. Alfred Binet borrowed and incorporated them into the Binet-Simon intelligence scale. Sentence completion was used extensively in memory research, especially in measuring implicit memory, and in psychotherapy to help find patients' motivations. He influenced Charlotte Bühler, who studied language meaning and society.

The Ebbinghaus Illusion. The orange circles appear to be of different sizes, despite their being equal.

Ebbinghaus discovered an optical illusion now known as the Ebbinghaus illusion, based on relative size perception. Despite the large amount of research done on this and similar illusions, little is known about why it occurs, but many speculate. During the illusion, two circles of identical size are placed near each other. One is surrounded by large circles while the other is surrounded by small circles, making the first appear smaller. Factors such as the different illustrations around the circles are called inducers and targets. Many theorists and scholars believe one of the main reasons for the illusions occurring are the geometrical features surrounding the spheres. This illusion is now used extensively in cognitive psychology research, to help map perception pathways in the human brain.

Ebbinghaus drafted the first standard research report. He arranged his paper on memory into four sections: the introduction, the methods, the results, and the discussion. The clear organization of this format so impressed his contemporaries that it became standard in the discipline.

== Discourse on the nature of psychology ==
In addition to pioneering experimental psychology, Ebbinghaus was also a strong defender of this direction of the new science, as is illustrated by his public dispute with University of Berlin colleague, Wilhelm Dilthey. Shortly after Ebbinghaus left Berlin in 1893, Dilthey published a paper extolling the virtues of descriptive psychology, and condemning experimental psychology as boring, claiming that the mind was too complex, and that introspection was the desired method of studying the mind. The debate at the time had been primarily whether psychology should aim to explain or understand the mind and whether it belonged to the natural or human sciences. Many had seen Dilthey's work as an outright attack on experimental psychology, Ebbinghaus included, and he responded to Dilthey with a personal letter and also a long scathing public article. Amongst his counterarguments against Dilthey he mentioned that it is inevitable for psychology to do hypothetical work and that the kind of psychology that Dilthey was attacking was the one that existed before Ebbinghaus's "experimental revolution". Charlotte Bühler echoed his words some forty years later, stating that people like Ebbinghaus "buried the old psychology in the 1890s". Ebbinghaus explained his scathing review by saying that he could not believe that Dilthey was advocating the status quo of structuralists like Wilhelm Wundt and Titchener and attempting to stifle psychology's progress.

== Influences ==
There has been some speculation as to what influenced Ebbinghaus in his undertakings. None of his professors seem to have influenced him, nor are there suggestions that his colleagues affected him. Von Hartmann's work, on which Ebbinghaus based his doctorate, did suggest that higher mental processes were hidden from view, which may have spurred Ebbinghaus to attempt to prove otherwise. The one influence that has always been cited as having inspired Ebbinghaus was Gustav Fechner's two-volume Elemente der Psychophysik. ("Elements of Psychophysics", 1860), a book which he purchased second-hand in England. It is said that the meticulous mathematical procedures impressed Ebbinghaus so much that he wanted to do for psychology what Fechner had done for psychophysics. This inspiration is also evident in that Ebbinghaus dedicated his second work Principles of Psychology to Fechner, signing it "I owe everything to you."

== Selected publications ==
- Ebbinghaus, H. (1885). Memory: A contribution to experimental psychology. New York: Dover.
- Ebbinghaus, H. (1902). Grundzüge der Psychologie. Leipzig: Veit & Co.
- Ebbinghaus, H. (1908). Psychology: An elementary textbook. New York: Arno Press.
