= Sebastian Leitner =

Sebastian Leitner (1919 – 1989) was a German commentator and science popularizer. In his 1972 book So lernt man Lernen (Learning to Learn) he advocated learning with flashcards.

Leitner was born in 1919 in Salzburg.

As a student in Vienna, he was briefly kept in custody by the Nazis in 1938 because of his opposition to the annexation of Austria into Greater Germany. Later he moved to Frankfurt to study law, and he joined the Nazi army in 1942. After spending several years in a Soviet POW camp, he returned to Germany in 1949 and started a career as a commentator. His wife was the Austrian journalist and author Thea Leitner.

== Books ==
- Leitner, Sebastian (1972). So lernt man lernen. Der Weg zum Erfolg [How to learn to learn: The way to success] (in German). Freiburg im Breisgau: Verlag Herder. ISBN 3-451-05060-9.
- Leitner, Sebastian (1974). So lernt man leben [How to learn to live] (in German). Munich: Droemer Knaur. ISBN 3-426-04571-0.
