= Spacing effect =

Psychological effect that people learn more by spreading studying out in time

The spacing effect demonstrates that learning is more effective when study sessions are spaced out. This effect shows that more information is encoded into long-term memory by spaced study sessions, also known as spaced repetition or spaced presentation, than by massed presentation ("cramming").

The phenomenon was first identified by Hermann Ebbinghaus, and his detailed study of it was published in the 1885 book Über das Gedächtnis. Untersuchungen zur experimentellen Psychologie (Memory: A Contribution to Experimental Psychology), which suggests that active recall with increasing time intervals reduces the probability of forgetting information. This robust finding has been supported by studies of many explicit memory tasks such as free recall, recognition, cued-recall, and frequency estimation (for reviews see Crowder 1976; Greene, 1989).

Researchers have offered several possible explanations of the spacing effect, and much research has been conducted that supports its impact on recall. In spite of these findings, the robustness of this phenomenon and its resistance to experimental manipulation have made empirical testing of its parameters difficult.

While many others have contributed important research regarding the spacing effect, Robert Bjork and his associates in the Bjork Learning and Forgetting Lab and Cogfog group at UCLA have performed much research into various aspects of this phenomenon as well as into its practical application for education.

== Causes ==
Decades of research on memory and recall have produced many different theories and findings on the spacing effect. In a study conducted by Cepeda et al. (2006) participants who used spaced practice on memory tasks outperformed those using massed practice in 259 out of 271 cases.

As different studies support different aspects of this effect, some now believe that an appropriate account should be multi-factorial, and at present, different mechanisms are invoked to account for the spacing effect in free recall and in cued-memory tasks.

Not much attention has been given to the study of the spacing effect in long-term retention tests. Shaughnessy (1977) found that the spacing effect is not robust for items presented twice after a 24-hour delay in testing. The spacing effect is present, however, for items presented four or six times and tested after a 24-hour delay. The result was interesting because other studies using only twice-presented items have shown a strong spacing effect, although the lag between learning and testing was longer. Shaughnessy interprets it as evidence that no single explanatory mechanism can be used to account for the various manifestations of the spacing effect.

=== Semantic priming ===
Research has shown reliable spacing effects in cued-memory tasks under incidental learning conditions, where semantic analysis is encouraged through orienting tasks (Challis, 1993; Russo & Mammaralla, 2002). Challis found a spacing effect for target words using a frequency estimation task after words were incidentally analyzed semantically. However, no spacing effect was found when the target words were shallowly encoded using a graphemic study task. This suggests that semantic priming underlies the spacing effect in cued-memory tasks. When items are presented in a massed fashion, the first occurrence of the target semantically primes the mental representation of that target, such that when the second occurrence appears directly after the first, there is a reduction in its semantic processing. Semantic priming wears off after a period of time (Kirsner, Smith, Lockhart, & King, 1984), which is why there is less semantic priming of the second occurrence of a spaced item. Thus on the semantic priming account, the second presentation is more strongly primed and receives less semantic processing when the repetitions are massed compared to when presentations are spaced over short lags (Challis, 1993). This semantic priming mechanism provides spaced words with more extensive processing than massed words, producing the spacing effect.

From this explanation of the spacing effect, it follows that this effect should not occur with nonsense stimuli that do not have a semantic representation in memory. A number of studies have demonstrated that the semantically based repetition priming approach cannot explain spacing effects in recognition memory for stimuli such as unfamiliar faces, and non-words that are not amenable to semantic analysis (Russo, Parkin, Taylor, & Wilks, 1998; Russo et al., 2002; Mammarella, Russo, & Avons, 2005). Cornoldi and Longoni (1977) have even found a significant spacing effect in a forced-choice recognition memory task when nonsense shapes were used as target stimuli. Russo et al. (1998) proposed that with cued memory of unfamiliar stimuli, a short-term perceptually-based repetition priming mechanism supports the spacing effect. When unfamiliar stimuli are used as targets in a cued-memory task, memory relies on the retrieval of structural-perceptual information about the targets. When the items are presented in a massed fashion, the first occurrence primes its second occurrence, leading to reduced perceptual processing of the second presentation. Short-term repetition-priming effects for nonwords are reduced when the lag between prime and target trials is reduced from zero to six (McKone, 1995), thus it follows that more extensive perceptual processing is given to the second occurrence of spaced items relative to that given to massed items. Hence, nonsense items with massed presentation receive less extensive perceptual processing than spaced items; thus, the retrieval of those items is impaired in cued-memory tasks.

Congruent with this view, Russo et al. (2002) demonstrated that changing the font in which repeated presentations of nonwords were presented reduced the short-term perceptual priming of those stimuli, especially for massed items. Upon a recognition memory test, there was no spacing effect found for the nonwords presented in different fonts during study. These results support the hypothesis that short-term perceptual priming is the mechanism that supports the spacing effects in cued-memory tasks when unfamiliar stimuli are used as targets. Furthermore, when the font was changed between repeated presentations of words in the study phase, there was no reduction of the spacing effect. This resistance to the font manipulation is expected with this two-factor account, as semantic processing of words at study determines performance on a later memory test, and the font manipulation is irrelevant to this form of processing.

Mammarella, Russo, & Avons (2002) also demonstrated that changing the orientation of faces between repeated presentations served to eliminate the spacing effect. Unfamiliar faces do not have stored representations in memory, thus the spacing effect for these stimuli would be a result of perceptual priming. Changing orientation served to alter the physical appearance of the stimuli, thus reducing the perceptual priming at the second occurrence of the face when presented in a massed fashion. This led to equal memory for faces presented in massed and spaced fashions, hence eliminating the spacing effect.

=== Encoding variability ===
The encoding variability theory holds that performance on a memory test is determined by the overlap between the available contextual information during the test and the contextual information available during the encoding. According to this view, spaced repetition typically entails some variability in presentation contexts, resulting in a greater number of retrieval cues. Contrastingly, massed repetitions have limited presentations and therefore fewer retrieval cues. The notion of the efficacy of the increased variability of encoding is supported by the position that the more independent encodings are, the more different types of cues are associated with an item.

There are two types of encoding variability theory that address the spacing effect. The first maintains that the spacing effect refers to the changes in the semantic interpretations of items which cause the effect, while the second holds that variability surrounding context is responsible for the spacing effect, not only semantic variability.

To test the encoding variability theory, Bird, Nicholson, and Ringer (1978) presented subjects with word lists that either had massed or spaced repetitions. Subjects were asked to perform various "orienting tasks", tasks which require the subject to make a simple judgment about the list item (i.e. pleasant or unpleasant, active or passive). Subjects either performed the same task for each occurrence of a word or a different task for each occurrence. If the encoding variability theory were true, then the case of different orienting tasks ought to provide variable encoding, even for massed repetitions, resulting in a higher rate of recall for massed repetitions than would be expected. The results showed no such effect, providing strong evidence against the importance of encoding variability.

=== Study-phase retrieval theory ===
A theory that has gained a lot of traction recently is the study-phase retrieval theory. This theory assumes that the first presentation is retrieved at the time of the second. This leads to an elaboration of the first memory trace. Massed presentations do not yield advantages because the first trace is active at the time of the second, so it is not retrieved or elaborated upon. Greene (1989) proposed a two-factor account of the spacing effect, combining deficient processing and study-phase retrieval accounts. Spacing effects in free recall are accounted for by the study-phase retrieval account. Under the assumption that free recall is sensitive to contextual associations, spaced items are at an advantage over massed items by the additional encoding of contextual information. Thus, the second occurrence of an item in a list reminds the observer of the previous occurrence of that same item and of its previous contextual features. Different contextual information is encoded with each presentation, whereas for massed items, the difference in context is relatively small. More retrieval cues, then, are encoded with spaced learning, which in turn leads to improved recall.

=== Deficient processing ===
According to the deficient processing view, massed repetitions lead to deficient processing of the second presentation—that we simply do not pay much attention to the later presentations (Hintzman et al., 1973). Greene (1989) proposed this to be the case in cued-memory tasks (e.g. recognition memory, frequency estimation tasks), which rely more on item information and less on contextual information. The increased voluntary rehearsal of spaced items makes this deficient processing noticeable. Findings that the spacing effect is not found when items are studied through incidental learning support this account.

=== Retrieval effort hypothesis ===
According to research conducted by Pyc and Rawson (2009), successful but effortful retrieval tasks during practice enhance memory in an account known as the retrieval effort hypothesis. Spacing out the learning and relearning of items leads to a more effortful retrieval which provides for deeper processing of the item.

== Practical applications and long-term retention ==
=== Advertising ===
The spacing effect and its underlying mechanisms have important applications to the world of advertising. For instance, the spacing effect dictates that it is not an effective advertising strategy to present the same commercial back-to-back (massed repetition). Spaced ads were remembered better than ads that had been repeated back to back. Layout variations presented in short spacing intervals also resulted in improved recall compared to ads presented in exact repetition. The same effect was also achieved in a study involving website advertisements. It was revealed that sales diminish progressively as the customer visited the site and was exposed to the ad several times. However, if the elapsed time between the visits was longer, the advertisement had a bigger effect on sales. If encoding variability is an important mechanism of the spacing effect, then a good advertising strategy might include a distributed presentation of different versions of the same ad.

Appleton-Knapp, Bjork and Wickens (2005) examined the effects of spacing on advertising. They found that spaced repetitions of advertisements are more affected by study-phase retrieval processes than encoding variability. They also found that at long intervals, varying the presentation of a given ad is not effective in producing higher recall rates among subjects (as predicted by variable encoding). Despite this finding, recognition is not affected by variations in an ad at long intervals.

=== Application in education ===
Studies have shown that long-term spacing effects are prevalent in learning and produce significant learning gains, particularly when the spacing gaps are on the order of days or weeks. Although it is accepted that spacing is beneficial in learning a subject well and previous units should be revisited and practiced, textbooks are written in discrete chapters that do not support these findings. Rohrer conducted a two-part study in 2006 where students were taught how to solve math problems. In part 1, students either used mass or spaced practice, and spaced practice showed significant improvement over mass practice when tested one week later. In the second part of the experiment, practice problems were either grouped by type or mixed randomly. The desirable difficulties encountered by the randomly mixed problems were effective, and the performance by students who solved the randomly mixed problems was vastly superior to the students who solved the problems grouped by type. The reasoning behind this increased performance was that students know the formula for solving equations, but do not always know when to apply the formula. By shuffling problems around and dispersing them across multiple chapters, students also learn to identify when it is appropriate to use which formula. There is conclusive evidence that cumulative final exams promote long-term retention by forcing spaced learning to occur.

=== Learning and pedagogy ===
The long-term effects of spacing have also been assessed in the context of learning a foreign language. Bahrick et al. (1993) examined the retention of newly learned foreign vocabulary words as a function of relearning sessions and intersession spacing over a nine-year period.

Both the amount of relearning sessions and the number of days in between each session have a major impact on retention (the repetition effect and the spacing effect), yet the two variables do not interact with each other.

For all three difficulty rankings of the foreign words, recall was highest for the 56-day interval as opposed to a 28-day or a 14-day interval. Additionally, 13 sessions spaced 56 days apart yielded comparable retention to 26 sessions with a 14-day interval.

These findings have implications for educational practices. Current school and university curricula rarely provide students with opportunities for periodic retrieval of previously acquired knowledge. Without spaced repetitions, students are more likely to forget foreign language vocabulary.

=== Lag effect ===
While the spacing effect refers to improved recall for spaced versus successive (mass) repetition, the term 'lag' can be interpreted as the time interval between repetitions of learning. The lag effect is simply an idea branching off the spacing effect that states recall after long lags between learning is better versus short lags. Michael Kahana's study showed strong evidence that the lag effect is present when recalling word lists. In 2008, Kornell and Bjork published a study that suggested inductive learning is more effective when spaced than massed. Inductive learning is learning through observation of exemplars, so the participants did not actively take notes or solve problems. These results were replicated and backed up by a second independent study.

== See also ==
- Distributed practice
- Forgetting curve
- List of cognitive biases
- Memory bias
- Testing effect
- Zeigarnik effect
