= Spaced repetition =

Learning technique performed with flashcards

In the Leitner system, correctly answered cards are advanced to the next, less frequent box, while incorrectly answered cards return to the first box for more aggressive review and repetition.

Spaced repetition is an evidence-based learning technique that is usually performed with flashcards. Newly introduced and more difficult flashcards are shown more frequently, while older and less difficult flashcards are shown less frequently in order to exploit the psychological spacing effect. The use of spaced repetition has been proven to increase the rate of learning.

Spaced repetition with forgetting curves

Although the principle is useful in many contexts, spaced repetition is commonly applied in contexts in which a learner must acquire many items and retain them indefinitely in memory. It is, therefore, well suited for the problem of vocabulary acquisition in the course of second-language learning. A number of spaced repetition software programs have been developed to aid the learning process. It is also possible to perform spaced repetition with physical flashcards using the Leitner system. The testing effect and spaced repetition can be combined to improve long-term memory. Therefore, memorization can be easier to do.

== History ==
The method of spaced repetition was first conceived of in the 1880s by German scientist Hermann Ebbinghaus. Ebbinghaus created the 'forgetting curve'—a graph portraying the loss of learned information over time—and postulated that it can be curbed by reviewing such information at several intervals over a period of time.

It was also tested by Thomas Landauer and Robert A. Bjork in 1978; they gathered a group of psychology students, showing the students pictures of a certain individual followed by that individual's name. This is also known as a face-name association. With the repetition of seeing the person's name and face they were able to associate the name and face of that individual shown with the expansion of time due to the spaced repetition.

Schacter, Rich, and Stampp in 1985 expanded the research to include people who have amnesia and other memory disorders. The findings showed that using spaced repetition can not only help students with name face association but patients dealing with memory impairments.

In 1989, C. J. Camp decided that using this technique with Alzheimer's patients may increase their duration of remembering particular things. These results show that the expansion of the time interval shows the strongest benefits for memory.

Spaced repetition is a method where the subject is asked to remember a certain fact with the time intervals increasing each time the fact is presented or said. If the subject is able to recall the information correctly the time is doubled to further help them keep the information fresh in their mind to recall in the future. With this method, the patient is able to place the information in their long-term memory. If they are unable to remember the information they go back to the previous step and continue to practice to help make the technique lasting (Vance & Farr, 2007).

The expansion is done to ensure a high success level of recalling the information on the first time and increasing the time interval to make the information long-lasting to help keep the information always accessible in their mind. Throughout the development of spaced repetition, they have found that patients using this technique with dementia are able to recall the information weeks—even months—later. The technique has been successful in helping dementia patients remember particular objects' names, daily tasks, name face association, information about themselves, and many other facts and behaviors (Small, 2012). Sufficient test evidence shows that spaced repetition is valuable in learning new information and recalling information from the past.

Small combines the works and findings of quite a few scientists to come up with five reasons why spaced repetition works: it helps show the relationship of routine memories, it shows the benefits of learning things with an expansion of time, it helps the patient with Alzheimer's dementia keep their brain active, it has a high success level with little to no errors, and the technique is meaningful for the patient to do and remember more things) Joltin et al. (2003), had a caregiver train a woman with Alzheimer's by giving her the name of her grandchild over the phone while asking her to associate with the picture of the grandchild posted on the refrigerator. After training, the woman was able to recall the name of her grandchild five days later.

== Research and application ==
The notion that spaced repetition could be used for improving learning was first proposed in the book Psychology of Study by C. A. Mace in 1932: "Perhaps the most important discoveries are those which relate to the appropriate distribution of the periods of study... Acts of revision should be spaced in gradually increasing intervals, roughly intervals of one day, two days, four days, eight days, and so on."

In 1939, H. F. Spitzer tested the effects of a type of spaced repetition on sixth-grade students in Iowa who were learning science facts. Spitzer tested over 3600 students in Iowa and showed that spaced repetition was effective. This early work went unnoticed, and the field was relatively quiet until the late 1960s when cognitive psychologists, including Melton and Landauer and Bjork, explored manipulation of repetition timing as a means to improve recall. Around the same time, Pimsleur language courses pioneered the practical application of spaced repetition theory to language learning, and in 1973 Sebastian Leitner devised his "Leitner system", an all-purpose spaced repetition learning system based on flashcards.

With the increase in access to personal computers in the 1980s, spaced repetition began to be implemented with computer-assisted language learning software-based solutions (see § Software), enabling automated scheduling and statistic gathering, scaling to thousands of cards scheduled individually. To enable the user to reach a target level of achievement (e.g. 90% of all material correctly recalled at any given time point), the software adjusts the repetition spacing interval. Material that is hard appears more often and material that is easy less often, with difficulty defined according to the ease with which the user is able to produce a correct response.

The data behind this initial research indicated that an increasing space between rehearsals (expanding) would yield a greater percentage of accuracy at test points. Spaced repetition with expanding intervals is believed to be so effective because with each expanded interval of repetition it becomes more difficult to retrieve the information because of the time elapsed between test periods; this creates a deeper level of processing of the learned information in long-term memory at each point. Another reason that the expanding repetition model is believed to work so effectively is that the first test happens early on in the rehearsal process. The purpose of this is to increase repetition success. By having a first test that followed initial learning with a successful repetition, people are more likely to remember this successful repetition on the following tests. Although expanding retrieval is commonly associated with spaced repetition, a uniform retrieval schedule is also a form of spaced repetition procedure.

A study conducted by Bui et al. (2013) examined how the advantages of spaced repetition can be influenced by the difference in working memory and the complexity of tasks that occurs between the repetitions. The researchers found participants with a higher working memory benefited from spaced repetition and showed better performance on challenging tasks.

Spaced repetition is typically studied through the use of memorizing facts. Traditionally speaking, it has not been applied to fields that required some manipulation or thought beyond simple factual/semantic information. A more recent study has shown that spaced repetition can benefit tasks such as solving math problems. In a study conducted by Pashler, Rohrer, Cepeda, and Carpenter, participants had to learn a simple math principle in either a spaced or massed retrieval schedule. The participants given the spaced repetition learning tasks showed higher scores on a final test distributed after their final practice session.

This is unique in the sense that it shows spaced repetition can be used to not only remember simple facts or contextual data but it can also be used in fields, such as math, where manipulation and the use of particular principles or formulas (e.g. y = mx + b) is necessary. These researchers also found that it is beneficial for feedback to be applied when administering the tests. When a participant gave a wrong response, they were likely to get it correct on the following tests if the researcher gave them the correct answer after a delayed period.

Building on this, more recent studies have applied spaced repetition to procedural skill acquisition in complex domains. For example, a pilot study in neurosurgery training found that incorporating spaced repetition into a six-week simulation module improved residents’ proficiency in performing complex surgical procedures. Participants who engaged in structured, repeated practice showed significant improvements in objective performance metrics compared to those who trained using traditional methods alone. This suggests that spaced repetition can effectively facilitate the acquisition of procedural knowledge in surgical contexts, including its demonstrated applications in other areas of medical training.

Spaced repetition is a useful tool for learning that is relevant to many domains such as fact learning, mathematics, and procedural skills, and many different tasks (expanding or uniform retrieval). Many studies over the years have contributed to the use and implementation of spaced repetition, and it still remains a subject of interest for many researchers.

Over the years, techniques and tests have been formed to better patients with memory difficulties. Spaced repetition is one of these solutions to help better the patients' minds. Spaced repetition is used in many different areas of memory from remembering facts to remembering how to ride a bike to remembering past events from childhood. Recovery practice is used to see if an individual is able to recall something immediately after they have seen or studied it. Increasing recovery practice is frequently used as a technique in improving long-term memory, essentially for young children trying to learn and older individuals with memory diseases.

== Algorithms ==
There are several families of spaced repetition algorithms:

- Leitner system—a simple scheme that uses five levels and an arbitrary number of study stages
- Neural-network-based
- The SM family of algorithms (SuperMemo#Algorithms), ranging from SM-0 (a paper-and-pencil prototype) to SM-18, which is built into SuperMemo 18 and 19.
- The DASH (Difficulty, Ability and Study History) family
- SSP-MMC (Stochastic Shortest Path Minimize Memorization Cost) and the closely related FSRS (Free Spaced Repetition Scheduler), which is available in Anki starting with release 23.10 and in RemNote starting with release 1.16

== Evidence and criticism ==
Spaced repetition is widely accepted as a performant learning strategy in a number of domains, with many researchers suggesting implementing this method in formal education. There is evidence that the popular method of "expanding intervals" (when the interval between the repetitions increases with each repetition) performs as well as or better than uniformly spaced repetitions. Some papers find expanding intervals to be beneficial for recall. Other meta-analyses tend to conclude that both methods yield similar results, therefore concluding that "strong recommendations to teachers and students in favor of spaced retrieval practice are warranted".

Several mechanisms were suggested for expanding intervals providing an additional benefit; the most notable one is that one of the core tenets of spaced repetition is that spacing increases the effort for retrieval, and that expanding intervals allow to gradually increase that difficulty. However, little evidence has been found to back this claim. It has been argued that the benefit observed for expanding intervals in some studies is due to other factors, such as the timing of the first retrieval, the number of repetitions or the overall spacing between the tests. It has also been proposed that the best schedule is learner-dependent, making general recommendations irrelevant.

== Implementations ==
=== Software ===
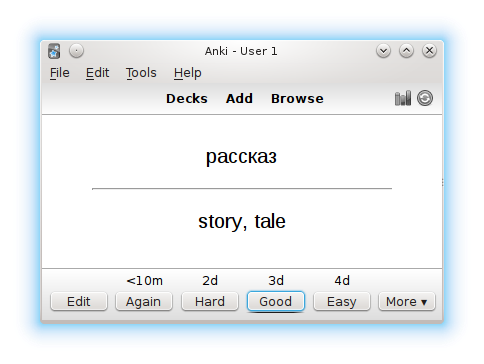
Anki being used for memorizing Russian vocabulary

Most spaced repetition software (SRS) is modeled after the manual style of learning with physical flashcards: items to memorize are entered into the program as question-answer pairs. When a pair is due to be reviewed, the question is displayed on a screen, and the user must attempt to answer. After answering, the user manually reveals the answer and then tells the program (subjectively) how difficult answering was. The program schedules pairs based on spaced repetition algorithms. Without a computer program, the user has to schedule physical flashcards; this is time-intensive and limits users to simple algorithms like the Leitner system.

To optimize review schedules, developments in spaced repetition algorithms focus on predictive modeling. These algorithms use randomly determined equations to determine the most effective timing for review sessions.

Further refinements with regard to software:

- Confidence-based repetition: A user rates their confidence in each digital flashcard, e.g. on a scale of 1–5; a lower-confidence card is repeated more frequently until the user upgrades their confidence rating in it.
- Questions and/or answers can be a sound file to train recognition of spoken words.
- Automatic generation of pairs (e.g. for vocabulary, it is useful to generate three question-pairs: written foreign word, its pronunciation and its meaning, but data only has to be entered once.)
- Additional information retrieved automatically is available, such as example sentences containing a word.
- Opportunities to combine spaced repetition with online community functions, e.g. sharing courses.

=== Paper flash cards ===
Animation of three sessions

The Leitner system is a widely used method of efficiently using flashcards that was proposed by the German science journalist Sebastian Leitner in the 1970s. It is a simple implementation of the principle of spaced repetition, where cards are reviewed at increasing intervals.

In this method, flashcards are sorted into groups according to how well the learner knows each one in Leitner's learning box. The learners try to recall the solution written on a flashcard. If they succeed, they send the card to the next group. If they fail, they send it back to the first group. Each succeeding group has a longer period of time before the learner is required to revisit the cards. In Leitner's original method, published in his book So lernt man Lernen (How To Learn To Learn), the schedule of repetition was governed by the size of the partitions in the learning box. These were 1, 2, 5, 8 and 14 cm. Only when a partition became full was the learner to review some of the cards it contained, moving them forward or back, depending on whether they remembered them.

=== Audio instruction ===
Graduated-interval recall is a type of spaced repetition published by Paul Pimsleur in 1967. It is used in the Pimsleur language learning system and is particularly suited to programmed audio instruction due to the very short times (measured in seconds or minutes) between the first few repetitions, as compared to other forms of spaced repetition which may not require such precise timings. The intervals published in Pimsleur's paper were: 5 seconds, 25 seconds, 2 minutes, 10 minutes, 1 hour, 5 hours, 1 day, 5 days, 25 days, 4 months, and 2 years.
