= Cram =

Cram may refer to:

- Cram (surname), a surname, and list of notable persons having the surname
- Cram.com, a website for creating and sharing flashcards
- Cram (Australian game show), a television show
- Cram (game show), a TV game show that aired on the Game Show Network
- Cram (game), an impartial mathematical game similar to domineering
- Cram (software), a flashcard application for Apple devices
- Cram Motorsport, an auto racing team based in Italy

CRAM may refer to:

- NCR CRAM, Card Random-Access Memory, a computer memory technology developed by NCR
- Chalcogenide RAM, Chalcogenide random access memory, a phase-change computer memory technology
- Challenge–response authentication mechanism, a computer security procedure
- Counter-RAM, counter-rockets, artillery and mortars, a weapons system
- MS-CRAM, also known as Microsoft Video 1, a codec
- CRAM diet, a cereal, rice, and milk diet
- CRAM (file format), a compressed genome sequence alignment file
- Cognitive robotic abstract machine, a cognitive architecture for robot manipulation

== See also ==
- Cramming (education), a slang term for last-minute study
- Cramming (fraud), adding inappropriate charges to a bill
- CRAMM, CCTA Risk Analysis and Method Management
- C-RAM (disambiguation)
- Kram (disambiguation)
- Crum (disambiguation)
- Crumb (disambiguation)
