= Crumley =

Crumley is a surname. Notable people with the surname include:

- Bob Crumley (1876–1949), Scottish professional footballer
- James Crumley (1939–2008), American author
- James Crumley (footballer) (1890–1981), Scottish footballer
- Jim Crumley (Scottish author) (born 1947), Scottish journalist
- Patrick Crumley (1860–1922), Irish Nationalist UK Member of the Parliament
- Tyler Crumley (born 2007), American actor

== See also ==
- Crumley Chapel, Alabama, unincorporated community in Jefferson County, Alabama
- Crumley-Lynn-Lodge House, historic home near Winchester, Frederick County, Virginia
- Crum (disambiguation)
- Crumbley
