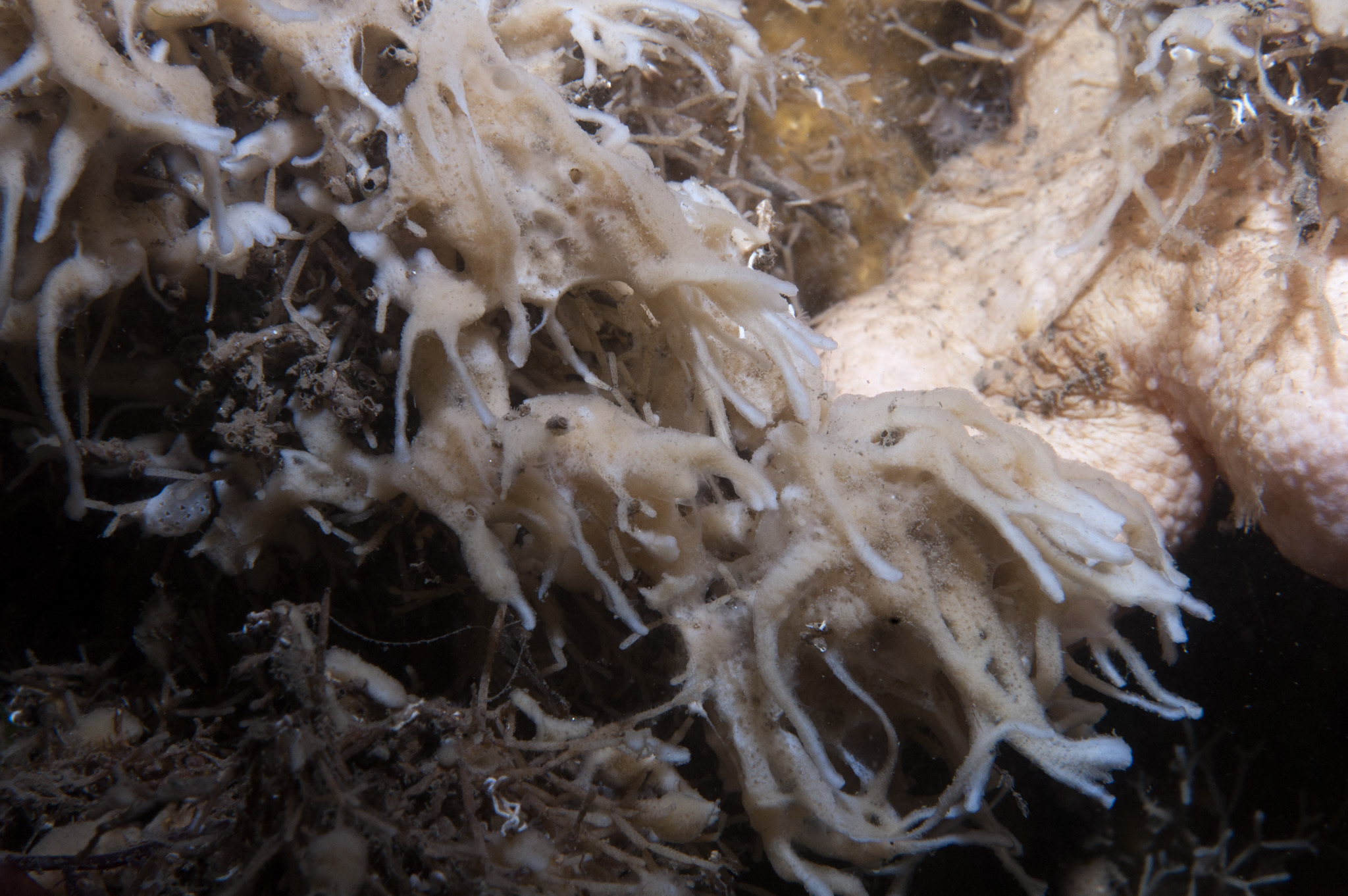

Scientific classification
- Domain: Eukaryota
- Kingdom: Animalia
- Phylum: Porifera
- Class: Demospongiae
- Order: Suberitida
- Family: Halichondriidae
- Genus: Hymeniacidon
- Species: H. kitchingi

Binomial name
- Hymeniacidon kitchingi (Burton, 1935)

Synonyms
- Rhaphidostyla kitchingi Burton, 1935

= Hymeniacidon kitchingi =

Species of sea sponge

Hymeniacidon kitchingi is a species of sponge in the class Demospongiae. It is found in shallow waters in the northeastern Atlantic Ocean. This species was first described in 1935 by the British zoologist Maurice Burton. He placed it in a new genus because of its unusual spicules, and named it Rhaphidostyla kitchingi, in honour of Dr J. A. Kitching, who had collected the original specimen. It was later transferred to the genus Hymeniacidon.

== Description ==
Hymeniacidon kitchingi is a small species forming cushions not exceeding 15 cm^{3} (1 cu in) in volume. The shape is very variable, with irregular lobes and various short, thin projections and more bulbous projections. Several ducts converge into each oscula; these exhalant openings are raised slightly above the surface and have transparent margins, but they are relatively inconspicuous. The surface of this sponge may be slightly rough, the texture is soft and compressible but porous, and the tissue crumbles easily. The general colour is grey or beige, sometimes tinged with pink or purple. The skeleton contains long, slender styles, megascleres with one end pointed and the other end rounded; the blunt end of each has a series of abrupt narrowings which gives a stepped effect. Some of these megascleres are scattered throughout the mesogloea while others are formed into wispy bundles supporting the surface of the sponge. Hymeniacidon kitchingi could be confused with Halichondria bowerbanki, but that species has longer, more slender lobes and a different range of spicules. Another similar species is Haliclona viscosa, but in that species, the oscula are on the ends of conical projections and are more noticeable.

== Distribution and habitat ==
Hymeniacidon kitchingi is native to the northeastern Atlantic Ocean, where its range extends from Scotland southwards to Finistère in northern France, and includes the western parts of the English Channel. It has also been reported from the eastern end of the Mediterranean Sea. It grows on rocks in the littoral zone and shallow sub-littoral zone, as well as on the holdfasts and stipes of kelp such as Saccharina latissima. It prefers areas where there is strong wave action. It also occurs as an epiphyte of large seaweeds and an epibiont of the bryozoans Cellaria and Pentapora.

== Ecology ==
Sponges draw water in through small pores, filter out the organic particles less than 2μm in diameter, and expel the water and any larger particles through the oscula. The diet of Hymeniacidon kitchingi is mainly bacteria, unicellular algae, and organic debris. It has been calculated that a 10 cm^{3} (0.6 cu in) sponge can filter 22.5 L (5 imp gal; 6 US gal) of water per day. The sponge is a hermaphrodite. After fertilisation, the embryos are brooded inside the sponge, and when they reach the last embryonic stage, they pass out through the oscula into the water column. They drift with the plankton, and after a few hours, settle on the seabed, attach themselves to the substrate and become juvenile sponges. The sponge can also reproduce asexually by budding, and like all sponges, it has great powers of regeneration.
