= Kram =

Kram may refer to:

- KRAM, a defunct radio station once licensed to serve West Klamath, Oregon, United States
- KRAM-LP, a radio station (96.7 FM) licensed to serve Montevideo, Minnesota, United States
- Kram (musician), the stage name for Mark Maher, a member of Australian band Spiderbait
- Kram (novel), a novel by Hans-Eric Hellberg
- Kram, a term for surnames among Kashmiris

== See also ==
- Le Kram, a town in Tunisia
- Cram (disambiguation)
- Karm (disambiguation)
