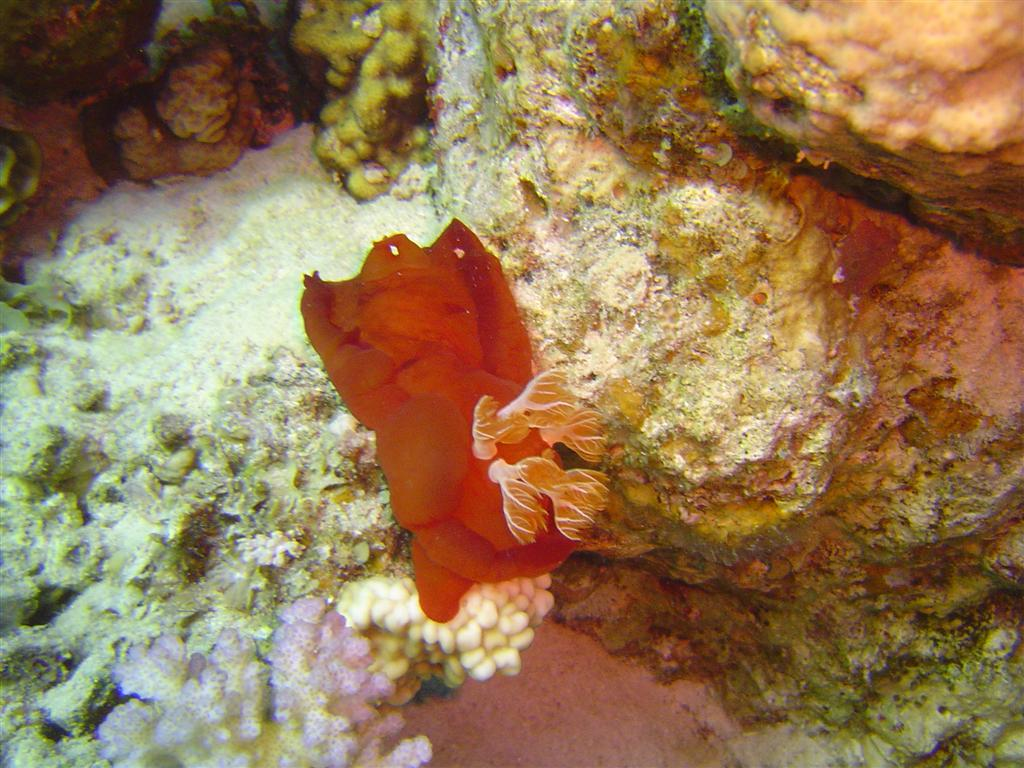
- Spanish dancer in daylight, Dahab

Scientific classification
- Kingdom: Animalia
- Phylum: Mollusca
- Class: Gastropoda
- Order: Nudibranchia
- Family: Hexabranchidae
- Genus: Hexabranchus
- Species: H. sanguineus

Binomial name
- Hexabranchus sanguineus (Ruppell & Leuckart, 1828)

Synonyms
- Albania formosa Collingwood, 1881; Doris imperialis Kent, 1897; Doris sanguinea Rüppell & Leuckart, 1828-1830 (nomen protectum); Hexabranchus petersi Bergh, 1878; Hexabranchus plicatus Hägg, 1903; Hexabranchus praetextus Ehrenberg, 1828; Hexabranchus suezensis Abraham, 1876

= Spanish dancer =

Species of gastropod

The Spanish dancer, scientific name Hexabranchus sanguineus (literally meaning "blood-colored six-gills"), is a dorid nudibranch, a very large and colorful sea slug, a marine gastropod mollusk in the family Hexabranchidae. The taxonomy of the genus Hexabranchus has been controversial but a thorough molecular and morphological study published in 2023 showed that the name H. sanguineus was being used for at least 5 distinct species.

== Description ==
Hexabranchus sanguineus is a large dorid nudibranch which commonly grows up to a maximum length of 25 cm, with some reports to 40 cm in the Red Sea. All Hexabranchus species have soft, flattened bodies, the anterior dorsal portion has a pair of retractable rhinophores and the posterior part has six contractile gills inserted independently in the body. The pair of oral tentacles are constituted by a fine flexible membrane provided with large digital lobes.

In a normal situation when the animal is crawling, the edges of its mantle are curled upwards creating a peripheral blister. If the animal is disturbed, it unfolds its edges and can swim through contractions and undulations of the body to move away from the disturbing element. Its common name, Spanish dancer, comes from this particular defense.

== Distribution and habitat ==
This species is reported from the Red Sea, the Western Indian Ocean, French Polynesia and the Western Pacific, with different colour morphs in each region which are not differentiated by morphology or DNA barcodes.

It likes rocky and coral reefs with many sponges and shelters from 1 to 50 meters deep.

== Biology ==
During daytime, the Spanish dancer hides away from the light in the crevices of its natural habitat, and it only comes out late at night. Like all nudibranchs, Spanish dancers are hermaphroditic, and their egg ribbons, which range in color from bright red to pink, have a spiral shape related to the size of the animal, so relatively large. The Spanish Dancer consumes sponges from the family Halichondriidae. After consuming sponges, the Spanish Dancer derives a potent chemical that it can use as defense. Hexabranchus sanguineus then passes the obtained defensive compounds into its egg ribbons via macrolides, giving the otherwise physically defenseless egg ribbons a toxin defense. The latter is coveted by some other species of nudibranch as Favorinus tsuruganus or Favorinus japonicus. The emperor shrimp, Periclimenes imperator, is a commensal shrimp that is commonly found living on Hexabranchus sanguineus.
