= List of flashcard software =

This article contains a list of notable flashcard software. Flashcards are widely used as a learning drill to aid memorization by way of spaced repetition.

== Software ==
Name	License	Free-of-charge version available	Spaced repetition	Number of sides	Supports Unicode	Supports image	Supports audio	Other formats	Printable	Import-export	Supports sync	Plugin support	Working offline
Anki	AGPLv3 (personal computer, Android), proprietary (iPhone)	Yes (except iOS)	Yes	Multiple	Yes	Yes	Yes	Video, LaTeX, HTML	Plugin	Yes	Yes	Yes	Yes
Brainscape	Proprietary	Yes	Yes	2	Yes	Yes	Yes	HTML, Markdown	Yes	Yes	Yes	Yes	Yes
Cobocards	Proprietary	Yes	Yes	Multiple	Yes	Yes	No	LaTeX	Yes	Yes	No	No	?
Course Hero	Proprietary	Yes	Yes	2	Yes	Yes	?		Yes	Yes	?	No	?
Cram	Shareware	No	Yes	?	?	?	?		?	?	?	?	Yes
Cram.com	Proprietary	Yes	Yes	3	Yes	Yes	Yes		Yes	Yes	?	No	No
Duolingo Tinycards (Discontinued)	Proprietary	Yes	Yes	2	Yes	Yes	Yes		No	No	No	No	No
Fresh Memory (Discontinued)	GPL3	Yes	Yes	Multiple	Yes	Yes	No	HTML, CVS	No	Yes	No	No	?
Mnemosyne	AGPLv3	Yes	Yes	3	Yes	Yes	Yes	Video, HTML, LaTeX, Flash	?	Yes	Yes	Yes	Yes
OpenCards	BSD	Yes	Yes	2	Yes	Yes	Yes	PowerPoint slides, Markdown	Yes	Yes	Via Dropbox	No	Yes
Pleco	Proprietary	Yes	Paid addon	Multiple	Yes	No	Yes		No	Yes	Via iCloud (iOS only)	No	After purchase
Quizlet	Proprietary	Yes	Yes	2	Yes	Yes	Yes; Text-to-speech in 18 languages		Yes	Yes	Yes	No	Partial
SuperMemo	Proprietary	Paid upgrade	Yes	?	Yes	Yes	Yes	Video, TeX	No	Yes	?	Yes	?
Topgrade	Proprietary	Yes	No	2	Yes	Yes	Yes	Video, HTML	Yes	Yes	Yes	No	?
Name	License	Free-of-charge version available	Spaced repetition	Number of sides	Supports Unicode	Supports image	Supports audio	Other formats	Printable	Import-export	Supports sync	Plugin support	Working offline

== Platform support ==
Software	Windows	macOS	ChromeOS	Linux	Android (Phone)	Android (Tablet)	iOS (iPhone)	iPad	Web browser
Anki	Yes	Yes	Yes	Yes	Yes	Yes	Yes	Yes	Yes
Brainscape	No	No	No	No	Yes	Yes	Yes	Yes	Yes
Cobocards	?	?	?	?	Yes	?	Yes	?	Yes
Course Hero	No	No	No	No	No	No	No	No	Yes
Cram	No	No	No	No	No	No	Yes	Yes	No
Cram.com	No	No	No	No	Yes	Yes	Yes	Yes	Yes
Fresh Memory (Discontinued)	Yes	No	No	Yes	No	No	No	No	No
Mnemosyne	Yes	Yes	No	Yes	Yes	Yes	No	No	Yes
OpenCards	Yes	Yes	No	Yes	No	No	No	No	No
Pleco	No	No	No	No	Yes	Yes	Yes	Yes	No
Quizlet	No	No	No	No	Yes	Yes	Yes	Yes	Yes
SuperMemo	Yes	No	No	No	Yes	Yes	Yes	Yes	Yes
Topgrade	Yes	Yes	Yes	Yes	Yes	Yes	Yes	Yes	Yes
Software	Windows	macOS	ChromeOS	Linux	Android (Phone)	Android (Tablet)	iOS (iPhone)	iPad	Web browser

== AI features comparison ==
The following table compares artificial intelligence features across modern flashcard applications.

Name	AI Flashcard Generation (from text)	AI Flashcard Generation (from PDF)	AI Flashcard Generation (from image)	AI Flashcard Generation (from audio)	AI Tutor / Chat	AI Image Generation	AI-Powered Spaced Repetition	AI Answer Generation	AI Quiz / Test Generation	AI Performance Analytics	AI Study Guide
Anki	No (via plugins only)	No (via plugins only)	No	No	No	No	No (algorithm-based, not AI-driven)	No	No	No	No
Quizlet	Yes (Magic Notes)	Yes (PDF summarizer)	No	No	No (Q-Chat discontinued)	No	Partial (Learn mode)	Yes	Yes (AI practice tests)	Partial	Yes
Brainscape	Yes	Yes	Yes (Photo to Flashcards)	No	No	No	Partial (confidence-based)	No	No	Partial	No
Name	AI Flashcard Generation (from text)	AI Flashcard Generation (from PDF)	AI Flashcard Generation (from image)	AI Flashcard Generation (from audio)	AI Tutor / Chat	AI Image Generation	AI-Powered Spaced Repetition	AI Answer Generation	AI Quiz / Test Generation	AI Performance Analytics	AI Study Guide

== Interface language support ==
The following table compares the number of interface languages supported by modern flashcard applications.

Software	Interface Languages	English	German	Spanish	French	Italian	Portuguese	Dutch	Russian	Turkish	Chinese	Japanese	Korean	Arabic	Persian	Swedish	Norwegian	Polish	Indonesian
Anki	40+ (community)	Yes	Yes	Yes	Yes	Yes	Yes	Yes	Yes	Yes	Yes	Yes	Yes	Yes	Yes	Yes	Yes	Yes	Yes
Quizlet	19	Yes	Yes	Yes	Yes	Yes	Yes	Yes	Yes	Yes	Yes	Yes	Yes	No	No	No	No	Yes	Yes
Brainscape	1	Yes	No	No	No	No	No	No	No	No	No	No	No	No	No	No	No	No	No
SuperMemo	3	Yes	No	No	No	No	No	No	No	No	No	No	No	No	No	No	No	Yes	No
