= Halichondria agglomerans =

Scientific classification
- Domain: Eukaryota
- Kingdom: Animalia
- Phylum: Porifera
- Class: Demospongiae
- Order: Suberitida
- Family: Halichondriidae
- Genus: Halichondria
- Species: H. agglomerans

Binomial name
- Halichondria agglomerans Cabioch, 1968

Species of sponge

Halichondria agglomerans is a species of sea sponge belonging to the family Halichondriidae.
