= Halichondria aldabrensis =

Scientific classification
- Kingdom: Animalia
- Phylum: Porifera
- Class: Demospongiae
- Order: Suberitida
- Family: Halichondriidae
- Genus: Halichondria
- Species: H. aldabrensis

Binomial name
- Halichondria aldabrensis (Lévi, 1961)

Species of sponge

Halichondria aldabrensis is a species of sea sponge belonging to the family Halichondriidae.
