= Halichondria schmidti =

Scientific classification
- Kingdom: Animalia
- Phylum: Porifera
- Class: Demospongiae
- Order: Suberitida
- Family: Halichondriidae
- Genus: Halichondria
- Species: H. schmidti

Binomial name
- Halichondria schmidti (Dendy, 1895)

Synonyms
- Eumastia schmidti Dendy, 1895

Species of sponge

Halichondria schmidti is a species of sea sponge belonging to the family Halichondriidae.
