= Amorphinopsis armata =

Scientific classification
- Kingdom: Animalia
- Phylum: Porifera
- Class: Demospongiae
- Order: Suberitida
- Family: Halichondriidae
- Genus: Amorphinopsis
- Species: A. armata

Binomial name
- Amorphinopsis armata (Lindgren, 1897)

Synonyms
- Halichondria armata

Species of sponge

Amorphinopsis armata, also known as Halichondria armata, is a species of sea sponge belonging to the family Halichondriidae.
