= Ciocalapata =

Scientific classification
- Kingdom: Animalia
- Phylum: Porifera
- Class: Demospongiae
- Order: Suberitida
- Family: Halichondriidae
- Genus: Ciocalapata; Laubenfels, 1936

Genus of sponges

Ciocalapata is a genus of sea sponges belonging to the family Halichondriidae.

== Species ==
- Ciocalapata amorphosa (Ridley & Dendy, 1886)
- Ciocalapata minuspiculifera, (Carvalho & Menegola, 2013)
- Ciocalapata almae, (Uriz & García-Gómez, 1996)
- Ciocalapata gibbsi, (Wells & Gray, 1960)
