= Student Brands =

American educational company

Student Brands, LLC
- Formerly: Study Mode Holdings, LLC
- Company type: Private
- Industry: Internet; Education
- Founder: Blaine Vess; Chris Nelson; Todd Clemens
- Headquarters: Los Angeles, California, United States
- Area served: Worldwide
- Services: Writing help; Flashcards
- Parent: Barnes & Noble Education, Inc.

Student Brands, LLC (formerly Study Mode Holdings, LLC) is a Los Angeles County-based company that owns and operates a network of educational websites and applications.

Student Brands’s network of websites includes StudyMode.com, where students can download model essays and term papers, book notes and AP notes; Cram.com, where students can share and review flashcards; and Cite.com, a citation generator and bibliography builder.

Student Brands was founded by Blaine Vess and Chris Nelson in 1999 when they re-launched the website, OPPapers.com. The company was originally run out of a dorm room at North Central College. By 2007, revenues and profits exceeded US$1 million. Todd Clemens joined the company in 2008. The company subsequently grew through the acquisitions and international site launches. In 2013, its portfolio included more than a dozen websites in several languages with around 2.5 million visitors per day and revenues exceed $10 million.

For more than a decade, the co-founders ran the company out of Vess’s home with about thirty remote contractors.

== Acquisition ==
Student Brands was acquired by Barnes & Noble Education in August 2017 for $58.5 million.

Learneo acquired Student Brands from Barnes & Noble Education in May 2023.
