= KKRM =

KKRM may refer to:

- KKRM-LD, a low-power television station (channel 11) licensed to serve Chico, California, United States
- KRAM-LP, a low-power radio station (96.7 FM) licensed to serve Montevideo, Minnesota, United States, which held the call sign KKRM-LP from 2003 to 2017
- KKMR, a radio station (106.5 FM) licensed to serve Arizona City, Arizona, United States, which held the call sign KKRM from 2001 to 2002
