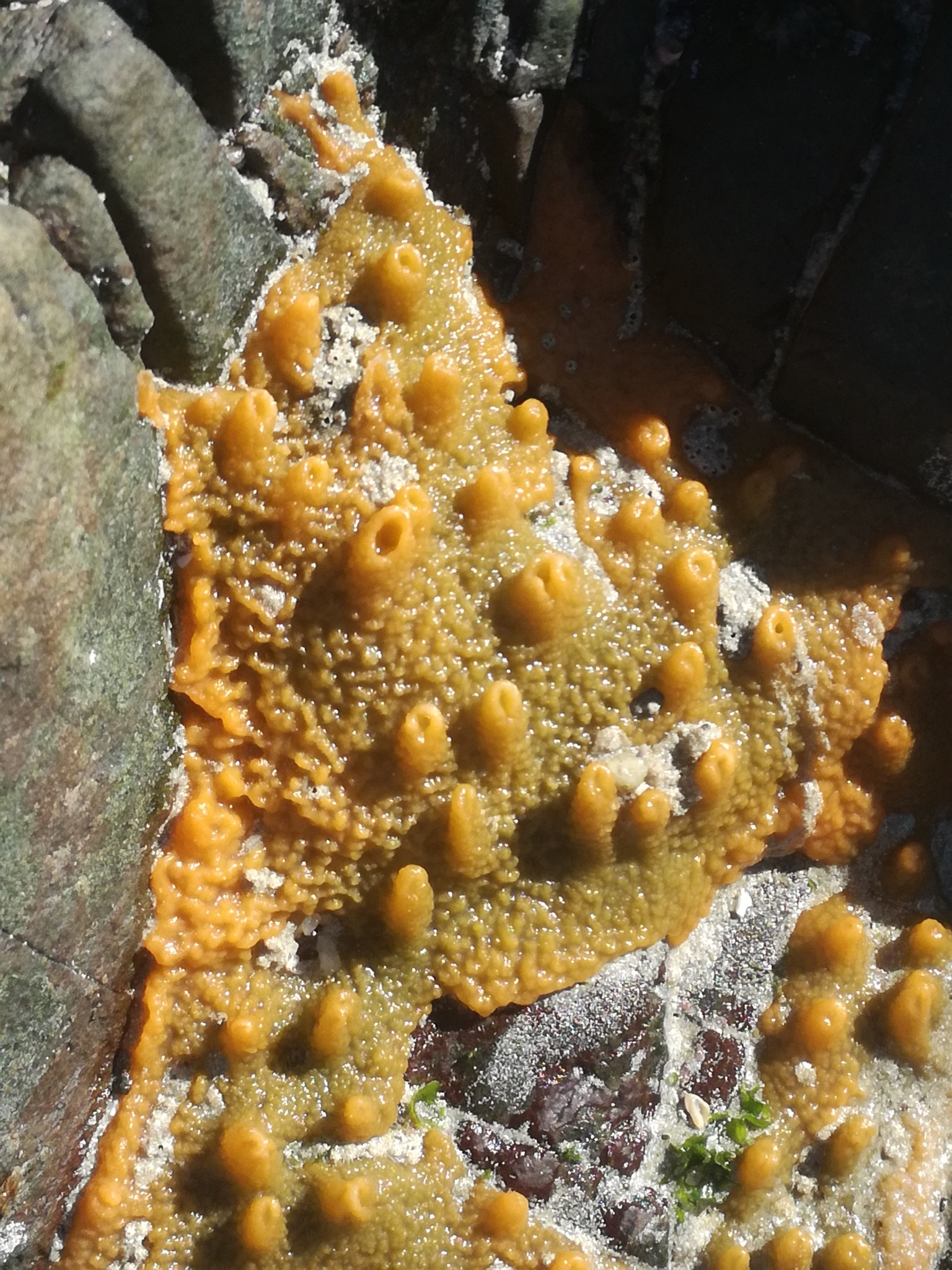

Scientific classification
- Domain: Eukaryota
- Kingdom: Animalia
- Phylum: Porifera
- Class: Demospongiae
- Order: Suberitida
- Family: Halichondriidae
- Genus: Hymeniacidon
- Species: H. perlevis

Binomial name
- Hymeniacidon perlevis (Montagu, 1818)

Synonyms
- List: Axinella cristagalli Maas, 1894; Halichondria caruncula (Bowerbank, 1858); Halichondria macularis Johnston, 1846; Halichondria sanguinea (Grant, 1826); Hymeniacidon aldousii Bowerbank, 1874; Hymeniacidon aurea (Montagu, 1814); Hymeniacidon caruncula Bowerbank, 1858; Hymeniacidon consimilis Bowerbank, 1866; Hymeniacidon hillieri Bowerbank, 1882; Hymeniacidon mammeata Bowerbank, 1866; Hymeniacidon medius Bowerbank, 1874; Hymeniacidon perleve [lapsus]; Hymeniacidon radiosa Bowerbank, 1874; Hymeniacidon sanguinea (Grant, 1826); Hymeniacidon virgulatus Bowerbank, 1882; Hymeniacidon viridans Bowerbank, 1866; Isodictya uniformis Bowerbank, 1866; Polymastia mammeata (Bowerbank, 1866); Raphiodesma simplissima Bowerbank, 1874; Reniera uniformis (Bowerbank, 1866); Spongia aurea Montagu, 1814; Spongia perlevis Montagu, 1814; Spongia sanguinea Grant, 1826; Stylinos uniformis (Bowerbank, 1866); Stylotella simplissima (Bowerbank, 1874); Stylotella uniformis (Bowerbank, 1866); Suberites paludum Schmidt, 1868

= Crumb-of-bread sponge =

Species of sponge

The crumb-of-bread sponge (Hymeniacidon perlevis) is a species of sea sponge in the class Demospongiae.

== Description ==
The crumb-of-bread sponge is a thickly encrusting sponge with a glistening bumpy surface. Specimens found intertidally are bright yellow. Specimens from deeper water are darker. The sponge has been found to have a certain scent, it's been described as exploded gunpowder. The oscula are scattered across the surface of the sponge and may be flush with the sponge surface or on raised mounds. The form of the sponge is variable, depending on its environment. In sheltered areas, branched structures grow from the base. In areas with wave action the surface is convoluted or flat.

== Distribution and habitat ==
The crumb-of-bread sponge is found in the northern Atlantic Ocean, the Mediterranean Sea and the Pacific Ocean, as well as around the southern African coast from the northern Cape to Port St Johns. It lives from the intertidal zone in tide pools to a maximum depth of about 15 meters (about 50 feet).
