= Halichondria arenacea =

Scientific classification
- Kingdom: Animalia
- Phylum: Porifera
- Class: Demospongiae
- Order: Suberitida
- Family: Halichondriidae
- Genus: Halichondria
- Species: H. arenacea

Binomial name
- Halichondria arenacea (Dendy, 1895)

Species of sponge

Halichondria arenacea is a species of sea sponge belonging to the family Halichondriidae.
