= Halichondria attenuata =

Scientific classification
- Kingdom: Animalia
- Phylum: Porifera
- Class: Demospongiae
- Order: Suberitida
- Family: Halichondriidae
- Genus: Halichondria
- Species: H. attenuata

Binomial name
- Halichondria attenuata (Topsent, 1915)

Synonyms
- Eumastia attenuata Topsent, 1915; Halichondria (Eumastia) attenuata (Topsent, 1915)

Species of sponge

Halichondria attenuata is a species of sea sponge belonging to the family Halichondriidae.
