= Halichondria axinelloides =

Scientific classification
- Domain: Eukaryota
- Kingdom: Animalia
- Phylum: Porifera
- Class: Demospongiae
- Order: Suberitida
- Family: Halichondriidae
- Genus: Halichondria
- Species: H. axinelloides

Binomial name
- Halichondria axinelloides (Swartschewsky, 1906)

Species of sponge

Halichondria axinelloides, is a species of sea sponge belonging to the family Halichondriidae.
