= Blaine Vess =

American entrepreneur, founder, and investor

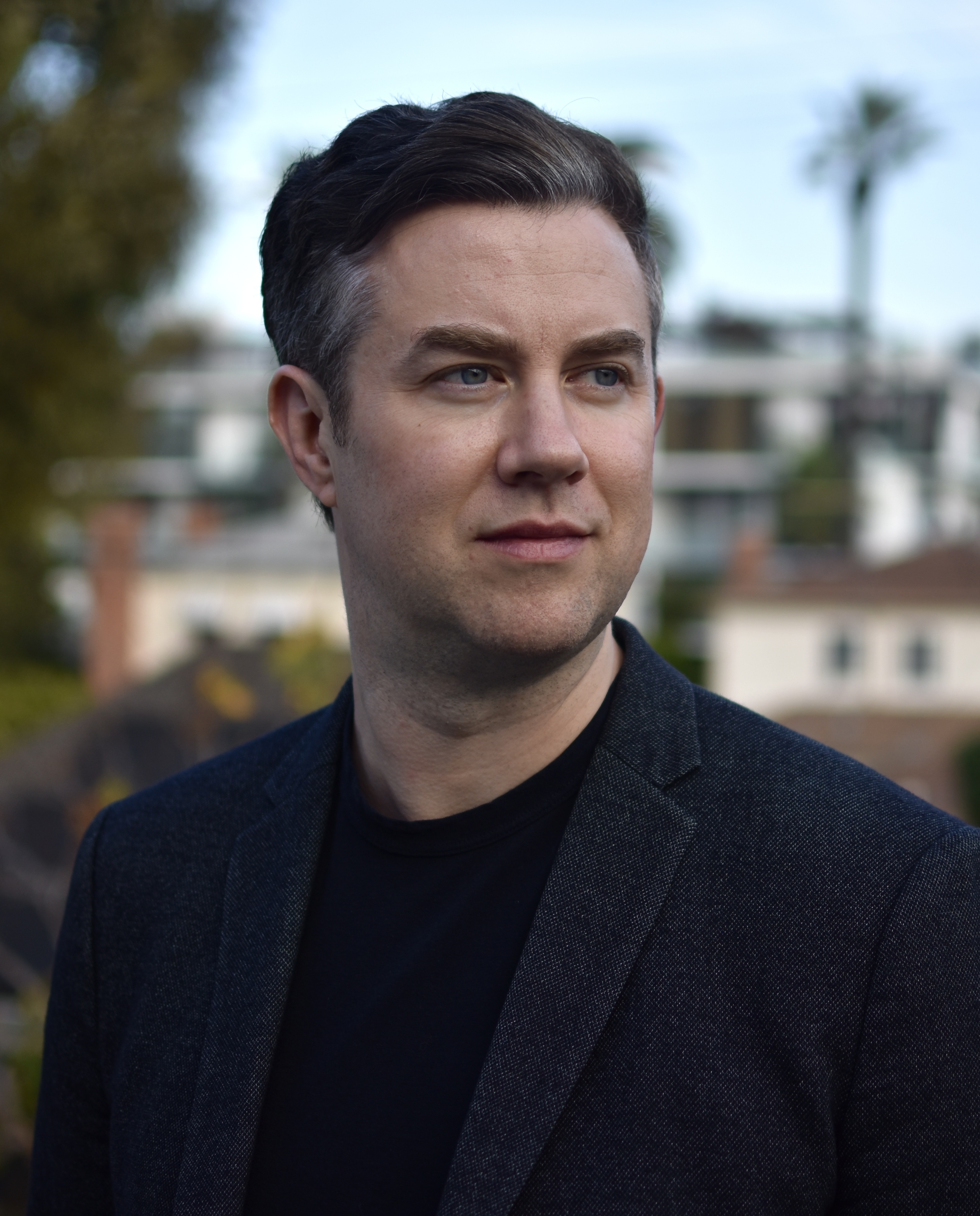
- Vess in 2024
- Education: San Jose State University
- Occupations: Entrepreneur; Investor

Blaine Vess is an American entrepreneur, founder, and investor. He has sold two companies, Student Brands and Solve, and has served as an executive producer on several documentaries such as Beyond Utopia and XY Chelsea. Vess has also been an investor in startups.

== Early life ==
Vess grew up in Darien, Illinois and later attended Naperville North High School in Naperville, Illinois. During his teenage years, he worked jobs in retail and service. Growing up, Vess wanted to be an entrepreneur and paid attention to the proliferation of internet businesses during the nineties. He then went to North Central College and San Jose State University, graduating from the latter in 2004.

== Career ==
=== Entrepreneurship ===
In 1999, while enrolled at North Central College, Vess co-founded OPPapers.com, a website that could search for study resources like term papers and essays. Over time, Vess' website would become Student Brands, a group of educational websites and various study resources like flashcards, test preparation, and essay help. The company was renamed later to Student Brands. Vess initially generated revenue on his website through ads and, starting in 2005, paywalls. In 2011, Vess moved Student Brands to a physical office in West Hollywood, California. By 2013, Vess acquired 15 websites and launched BuenasTareas.com; the Los Angeles Times reported that StudyMode was grossing over $10 million in revenue annually. In November 2017, Vess sold Student Brands to Barnes & Noble Education for $58.5 million.

In 2016, Vess founded his second company, Solve, an airport concierge service, which was later a part of Y Combinator's summer 2017 batch. It was acquired by Blacklane in 2017.

=== Film ===
After graduating from San Jose State University in 2004, Vess moved to Los Angeles to work with New Line Cinema as a consultant from 2005 to 2008. There, he worked on marketing for films like Snakes on a Plane and Wedding Crashers. After New Line Cinema merged with Warner Bros., Vess was laid off.

About a year after leaving New Line Cinema, Vess founded his television development company, Four Henrys Productions, with Aisha Wynn, with a focus in reality television. They have co-created shows like I'm Married to a... and Flipping Miami.

In 2012, Vess visited North Korea, after which he joined Liberty in North Korea, an American nonprofit seeking to help refugees from the country. Two years later, in 2014, Vess bought a $64,000 shot of whiskey to support the organization. Later, in 2023, Vess served as a co-executive producer for Beyond Utopia, a documentary film about North Korean defectors which won the Sundance Film Festival Audience Award for U.S. Documentary in the same year and has since faced some scrutiny for its depiction of the North Korean government.

In addition to Beyond Utopia and XY Chelsea, Vess has served as an executive producer to multiple narrative films including Ms. Purple, Gook, and Trophy. He was also a co-producer of the documentary film, Where's My Roy Cohn?

=== Investing ===
In 2022, Vess founded Joyful Ventures, a venture capital fund, with Milo Runkle and Jennifer Stojkovic. Aimed toward innovation in the food sector, the fund raised a total of $25 million in 2023 to disburse to projects developing sustainable proteins such as plant-based protein and mycoprotein. That year, Vess and his co-founders funded companies such as New School Foods, a company developing plant-based meat alternatives, and Orbillion Bio, a cultivated meat company.
