= Halichondria adelpha =

Scientific classification
- Kingdom: Animalia
- Phylum: Porifera
- Class: Demospongiae
- Order: Suberitida
- Family: Halichondriidae
- Genus: Halichondria
- Species: H. adelpha

Binomial name
- Halichondria adelpha de Laubenfels, 1954

Species of sponge

Halichondria adelpha is a species of sea sponge belonging to the family Halichondriidae.
