= Halichondria maraensis =

Scientific classification
- Kingdom: Animalia
- Phylum: Porifera
- Class: Demospongiae
- Order: Suberitida
- Family: Halichondriidae
- Genus: Halichondria
- Species: H. maraensis

Binomial name
- Halichondria maraensis (Kim & Sim, 2009)

Species of sponge

Halichondria maraensis is a species of sea sponge belonging to the family Halichondriidae.
