= Halichondria papillaris =

Scientific classification
- Kingdom: Animalia
- Phylum: Porifera
- Class: Demospongiae
- Order: Suberitida
- Family: Halichondriidae
- Genus: Halichondria
- Species: H. papillaris

Binomial name
- Halichondria papillaris (Pallas, 1766)

Synonyms
- Spongia papillaris Pallas, 1766; Scypha papillaris (Pallas, 1766)

Species of sponge

Halichondria papillaris is a species of sea sponge belonging to the family Halichondriidae.
