= Karm (disambiguation) =

Karm is a 1977 Indian Hindi-language film.

Karm may also refer to:

- Karma, concept in Indian religions
- KARM, a radio of California
- Karm Island (Norway)
- Karm Island (Antarctica)
- Friedrich Karm (1907–1980), Estonian footballer
- Knoxville Area Rescue Ministries, a Christian foundation that runs thrift stores in the Knoxville metropolitan area.

== See also ==
- Kram (disambiguation)
- Karam (disambiguation)
- Karma (disambiguation)
