= Halichondria sitiens =

Scientific classification
- Kingdom: Animalia
- Phylum: Porifera
- Class: Demospongiae
- Order: Suberitida
- Family: Halichondriidae
- Genus: Halichondria
- Species: H. sitiens

Binomial name
- Halichondria sitiens (Schmidt, 1870)

Synonyms
- List: Eumastia sitiens Schmidt, 1870; Amorphina nodosa Fristedt, 1887; Cioxeamastia polycalypta de Laubenfels, 1942; Halichondria borealis (Miklucho-Maclay, 1870); Halichondria nodosa (Fristedt, 1887); Halichondria (Eumastia) sitiens Schmidt, 1870; Pellina sitiens (Schmidt, 1870); Spuma borealis Miklucho-Maclay, 1870

Species of sponge

Halichondria sitiens is a species of sea sponge belonging to the family Halichondriidae.
