= C-RAM (disambiguation) =

C-RAM, short for counter rocket, artillery, and mortar, is a set of systems used to detect and/or destroy incoming rockets, artillery, and mortar rounds in the air.

C-RAM may also refer to:

- Centurion C-RAM, American air defense artillery system
- Chalcogenide RAM, an alternative name for phase-change memory
- Computational RAM, random access memory with integrated processing elements

== See also ==
- CRAM (disambiguation)
