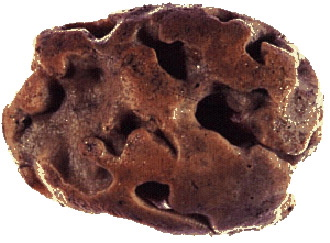
- Halichondria panicea

Scientific classification
- Kingdom: Animalia
- Phylum: Porifera
- Class: Demospongiae
- Order: Suberitida
- Family: Halichondriidae
- Genus: Halichondria; Fleming, 1828

Species
- see text

= Halichondria =

Genus of sponges

Halichondria is a genus of sea sponges belonging to the family Halichondriidae. These are massive, amorphous sponges with clearly separated inner and outer skeletons consisting of bundles of spicules arranged in a seemingly random pattern.

This genus of sponges became important through the discovery of cell division limiting properties of the extract Halichondrin B, which inhibits cell mitosis. The drug Eribulin, a related compound and an inhibitor of microtubule function, has become an important chemotherapy treatment for certain types of cancer.

== Species ==
The following species are recognised in the genus Halichondria:

- Subgenus Eumastia Schmidt, 1870
  - Halichondria attenuata (Topsent, 1915)
  - Halichondria maraensis Kim & Sim, 2009
  - Halichondria schmidti Dendy, 1895
  - Halichondria sitiens (Schmidt, 1870)
- Subgenus Halichondria Fleming, 1828
  - Halichondria adelpha de Laubenfels, 1954
  - Halichondria agglomerans Cabioch, 1968
  - Halichondria aldabrensis Lévi, 1961
  - Halichondria almae (Carballo, Uriz & García-Gómez, 1996)
  - Halichondria arenacea Dendy, 1895
  - Halichondria arenosa Hentschel, 1929
  - Halichondria axinelloides Swartschewsky, 1906
  - Halichondria bowerbanki Burton, 1930
  - Halichondria brondstedi De Laubenfels, 1936
  - Halichondria brunnea (Schmidt, 1868)
  - Halichondria cancellosa (Carter, 1886)
  - Halichondria capensis Samaai & Gibbons, 2005
  - Halichondria carotenoidea Alvarez & Hooper, 2011
  - Halichondria cartilaginea (Esper, 1794)
  - Halichondria cebimarensis Carvalho & Hajdu, 2001
  - Halichondria coerulea Bergquist, 1967
  - Halichondria colossea Lundbeck, 1902
  - Halichondria contorta (Sarà, 1961)
  - Halichondria convolvens Sarà, 1960
  - Halichondria cornuloides Burton, 1954
  - Halichondria cristata Sarà, 1978
  - Halichondria cylindrata Tanita & Hoshino, 1989
  - Halichondria darwinensis Hooper, Cook, Hobbs & Kennedy, 1997
  - Halichondria diazae Van Soest & Hooper, 2020
  - Halichondria diversispiculata Burton, 1930
  - Halichondria dubia (Czerniavsky, 1880)
  - Halichondria elenae Gastaldi, De Paula, Narvarte, Lôbo-Hajdu & Hajdu, 2018
  - Halichondria fallax (Marshall, 1892)
  - Halichondria flexuosa (Sarà, 1978)
  - Halichondria foetida (Wilson, 1894)
  - Halichondria foraminosa (Czerniavsky, 1880)
  - Halichondria fragilis Kieschnick, 1896
  - Halichondria gageoenesis Kang & Sim, 2008
  - Halichondria genitrix (Schmidt, 1870)
  - Halichondria gilvus Samaai & Gibbons, 2005
  - Halichondria glabrata Keller, 1891
  - Halichondria heterorrhaphis Breitfuss, 1912
  - Halichondria intermedia Brøndsted, 1924
  - Halichondria isthmica (Keller, 1883)
  - Halichondria japonica (Kadota, 1922)
  - Halichondria knowltoni Bergquist, 1961
  - Halichondria labiata Hentschel, 1929
  - Halichondria lambei Brøndsted, 1933
  - Halichondria lendenfeldi Lévi, 1961
  - Halichondria leuconoides Topsent, 1890
  - Halichondria longispicula (Czerniavsky, 1880)
  - Halichondria lutea Alcolado, 1984
  - Halichondria magniconulosa Hechtel, 1965
  - Halichondria marianae Santos, Nascimento & Pinheiro, 2018
  - Halichondria melanadocia Laubenfels, 1936
  - Halichondria membranacea (Sarà, 1978)
  - Halichondria microbiana Alvarez & Hooper, 1911
  - Halichondria migottea Carvalho & Hajdu, 2001
  - Halichondria minuta Keller, 1891
  - Halichondria modesta (Pulitzer-Finali, 1986)
  - Halichondria moorei Bergquist, 1961
  - Halichondria muanensis Kang & Sim, 2008
  - Halichondria nigrocutis (Carter, 1886)
  - Halichondria normani Burton, 1930
  - Halichondria oblonga (Hansen, 1885)
  - Halichondria okadai (Kadota, 1922)
  - Halichondria osculum Lundbeck, 1902
  - Halichondria oshoro Tanita, 1961
  - Halichondria oxiparva (Sarà, 1978)
  - Halichondria panicea (Pallas, 1766)
  - Halichondria papillaris (Pallas, 1766)
  - Halichondria pelliculata Ridley & Dendy, 1886
  - Halichondria phakellioides Dendy & Frederick, 1924
  - Halichondria poa (de Laubenfels, 1947)
  - Halichondria pontica (Czerniavsky, 1880)
  - Halichondria prostrata Thiele, 1905
  - Halichondria punctata Bergquist, 1970
  - Halichondria renieroides (Fristedt, 1887)
  - Halichondria semitubulosa (Lamarck, 1814)
  - Halichondria solidior (Schmidt, 1870)
  - Halichondria stylata Diaz, Pomponi & Van Soest, 1993
  - Halichondria suberosa (Esper, 1794)
  - Halichondria sulfurea Carvalho & Hajdu, 2001
  - Halichondria surrubicunda Hoshino, 1981
  - Halichondria syringea Pulitzer-Finali, 1996
  - Halichondria tenebrica Carvalho & Hajdu, 2001
  - Halichondria tenuiramosa Dendy, 1922
  - Halichondria tenuispiculata Brøndsted, 1916
  - Halichondria turritella (Schmidt, 1870)
  - Halichondria velamentosa (Hansen, 1885)
- Subgenus unassigned
  - Halichondria albescens sensu Johnston, 1842
  - Halichondria flava (Merejkowski, 1878)
  - Halichondria hongdoenesis Kang & Sim, 2008
  - Halichondria kelleri Van Soest & Hooper, 2020
  - Halichondria lona Laubenfels, 1936
  - Halichondria magellanica Dendy, 1924
  - Halichondria ulleungensis Kang & Sim, 2008
