= Crumb =

Crumb or Crumbs may refer to:

== Crumb ==
- Crumb (film), a 1994 documentary about cartoonist Robert Crumb
- Crumb (surname)
- Crumb (unit), a unit of information consisting of two bits
- Crumb (band), an American indie band
- Crumb (bread), the interior region of a loaf of bread

== Crumbs ==
- Crumbs (TV series), a 2006 television series
- Crumbs (film), a 2015 Ethiopian post-apocalyptic science fiction romance film
- Bread crumbs, particles of bread
- The Crumbs, an American rock band
- "Crumbs", a song by Ministry from their 1996 album Filth Pig
- "Crumbs", a song by Rebecca Black from Let Her Burn
- Crumbs Bake Shop, a New York City bakery founded in 2003
- Crumbs Sugar Cookie, a Lalaloopsy doll and character in the TV series
- "Crumbs", an episode of the TV series Pocoyo

== See also ==
- The Cartier Project, a 1987 novel by Miha Mazzini, first published in Slovenia as Drobtinice ("Crumbs")
- Breadcrumb (disambiguation)
- Crumble (disambiguation)
- Crumbling (disambiguation)
