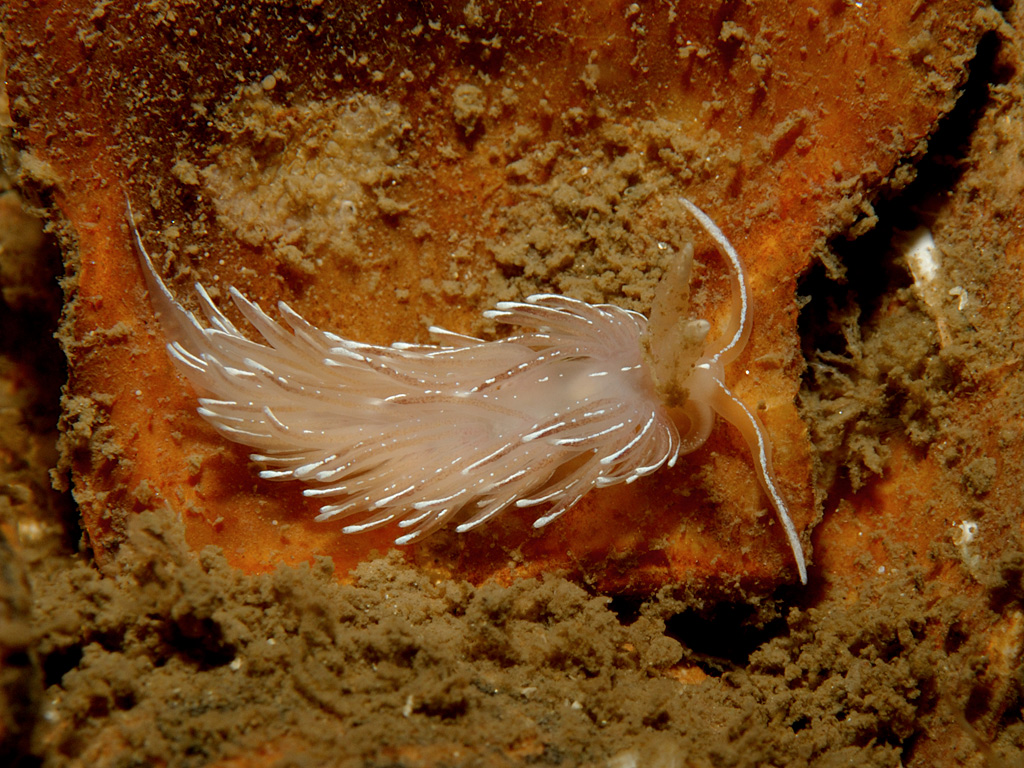
- Favorinus blianus

Scientific classification
- Kingdom: Animalia
- Phylum: Mollusca
- Class: Gastropoda
- Order: Nudibranchia
- Suborder: Aeolidacea
- Superfamily: Aeolidioidea
- Family: Favorinidae; Bergh, 1889
- Genus: Favorinus; M. E. Gray, 1850

Type species
- Eolis alba Alder & Hancock, 1844

Synonyms
- Matharena Bergh in Mörch, 1871

= Favorinus (gastropod) =

Genus of gastropods

Favorinus is a genus of nudibranchs, shell-less marine gastropod molluscs or sea slugs, within the superfamily Aeolidioidea, and the only member of the family Favorinidae.

== Species ==
Species within the genus Favorinus include:

- Favorinus auritulus Er. Marcus, 1955
- Favorinus blianus Lemche & Thompson, 1974
- Favorinus branchialis (Rathke, 1806)
- Favorinus elenalexiae Garcia F. & Troncoso, 2001
- Favorinus ghanensis Edmunds, 1968
- Favorinus japonicus Baba, 1949
- Favorinus joubini (Risbec, 1928)
- Favorinus mirabilis Baba, 1955
- Favorinus pacificus Baba, 1937
- Favorinus pannuceus Burn, 1962
- Favorinus perfoliatus Baba, 1949
- Favorinus tsuruganus Baba & Abe, 1964
- Favorinus vitreus Ortea, 1982

Species brought into synonymy

- Favorinus albidus Iredale & O'Donoghue, 1923: synonym of Favorinus branchialis (Rathke, 1806) (synonym)
- Favorinus albus Odhner, 1914: synonym of Dicata odhneri Schmekel, 1967 (dubious synonym)
- Favorinus albus (Alder & Hancock, 1844): synonym of Favorinus branchialis (Rathke, 1806)
- Favorinus horridus Macnae, 1954: synonym of Phyllodesmium horridum (Macnae, 1954)
