= Axinyssa =

Scientific classification
- Kingdom: Animalia
- Phylum: Porifera
- Class: Demospongiae
- Order: Suberitida
- Family: Halichondriidae
- Genus: Axinyssa; Lendenfeld, 1897

Synonyms
- Astromimus Lendenfeld, 1898; Axinomimus Laubenfels, 1936; Oxeosarcodea de Laubenfels, 1954; Pseudaxinyssa Burton, 1931

Genus of sponges

Axinyssa is a genus of sea sponges belonging to the family Halichondriidae.

== Species ==
- Axinyssa aculeata Wilson, 1925
- Axinyssa ambrosia (Laubenfels, 1936)
- Axinyssa aplysinoides (Dendy, 1922)
- Axinyssa aurantiaca (Schmidt, 1864)
- Axinyssa bergquistae (Hooper, Cook, Hobbs & Kennedy, 1997)
- Axinyssa cavernosa (Topsent, 1897)
- Axinyssa digitata (Cabioch, 1968)
- Axinyssa diversicolor (Carballo, 2000)
- Axinyssa djiferi Boury-Esnault, Marschal, Kornprobst & Barnathan, 2002
- Axinyssa gracilis (Hentschel, 1912)
- Axinyssa gravieri Topsent, 1906
- Axinyssa isabela Carballo & Cruz-Barraza, 2008
- Axinyssa mertoni (Hentschel, 1912)
- Axinyssa michaelis Kefalas & Castritsi-Catharios, 2007
- Axinyssa oinops (de Laubenfels, 1954)
- Axinyssa papillosa (Sarà & Siribelli, 1962)
- Axinyssa papuensis Thomas, 2002
- Axinyssa paradoxa (Ridley & Dendy, 1886)
- Axinyssa radiata (Lévi & Lévi, 1983)
- Axinyssa tenax Pulitzer-Finali, 1993
- Axinyssa tenuispiculata (Burton, 1931)
- Axinyssa terpnis (De Laubenfels, 1954)
- Axinyssa tethyoides Kirkpatrick, 1903
- Axinyssa topsenti Lendenfeld, 1897
- Axinyssa tuscara (Ristau, 1978)
- Axinyssa valida (Thiele, 1899)
- Axinyssa variabilis (Lindgren, 1897)
- Axinyssa yumae (Pulitzer-Finali, 1986)
