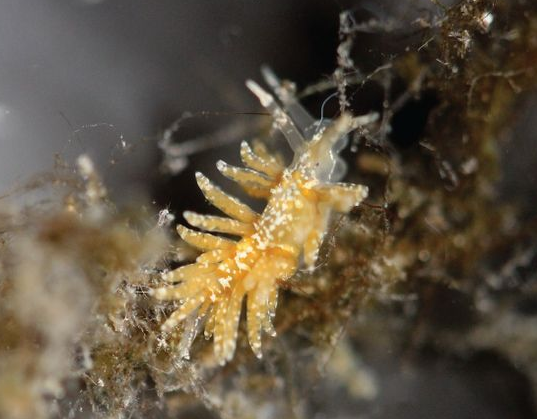
- Favorinus auritulus

Scientific classification
- Domain: Eukaryota
- Kingdom: Animalia
- Phylum: Mollusca
- Class: Gastropoda
- Order: Nudibranchia
- Suborder: Cladobranchia
- Family: Facelinidae
- Genus: Favorinus
- Species: F. auritulus

Binomial name
- Favorinus auritulus Er. Marcus, 1955

= Favorinus auritulus =

Species of gastropod

Favorinus blianus is a species of sea slug, an aeolid nudibranch in the family Facelinidae.

== Description ==
The maximum recorded body length is 13 mm.

== Habitat ==
Minimum recorded depth is 0 m. Maximum recorded depth is 2 m.
