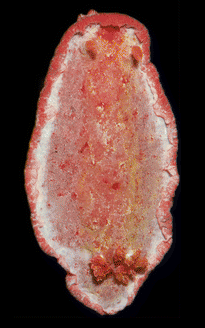
- dorsal view of Hexabranchus morsomus

Scientific classification
- Kingdom: Animalia
- Phylum: Mollusca
- Class: Gastropoda
- Order: Nudibranchia
- Family: Hexabranchidae
- Genus: Hexabranchus
- Species: H. morsomus

Binomial name
- Hexabranchus morsomus Ev. Marcus & Er. Marcus, 1962

Synonyms
- Caribranchus morsomus (Ev. Marcus & Er. Marcus, 1962)

= Hexabranchus morsomus =

Species of gastropod

Hexabranchus morsomus, also known as the Caribbean Spanish Dancer, is a species of sea slug, a marine mollusc in the family Hexabranchidae.

== Distribution ==
It occurs in the Caribbean Sea including waters around St. Kitts and the Netherlands Antilles, and has also been identified in Honduras, Panama, Costa Rica, Venezuela, St. Lucia, Martinique, Antigua, Grenada, St. Vincent & the Grenadines, Trinidad and Tobago, Aruba, Puerto Rico, Virgin Islands, Sint Maarten.

== Description ==
Body is oval to elongate. Dorsum is small with conical tubercles. Rhinophores are club shaped. Gill is large, composed of several multi-pinnated leaves. Background color is reddish with mottled white and yellow patches on the dorsum. Mantle margin usually curled up over small portion of dorsum covering white areas. It is up to 400 mm long.

== Ecology ==
It is found under rocks or coral rubble, primarily on living reefs. Minimum recorded depth is 0 m. Maximum recorded depth is 33 m. Defensive behavior consists of the unrolling of the mantle margins to expose bright white areas followed by swimming by contracting the body and mantle margin. Species of the genus Hexabranchus prey on a variety of sponges.
