= Cribella =

Scientific classification
- Kingdom: Animalia
- Phylum: Bryozoa
- Class: Gymnolaemata
- Order: Cheilostomatida
- Family: Bitectiporidae
- Genus: Cribella; Jullien, 1903

Species
- Cribella nova Jullien & Calvet, 1903; Cribella strophiae Canu & Bassler, 1927

Genus of moss animals

Cribella is a genus of bryozoans in the family Bitectiporidae.

== See also ==
- List of prehistoric bryozoan genera
- Cribella elegans Schmidt, 1862, a synonym of Crella elegans (sponge)
