= Amorphinopsis =

Scientific classification
- Domain: Eukaryota
- Kingdom: Animalia
- Phylum: Porifera
- Class: Demospongiae
- Order: Suberitida
- Family: Halichondriidae
- Genus: Amorphinopsis; Carter, 1887

Synonyms
- Nailondria de Laubenfels, 1954; Prostylissa Topsent, 1925; Tumata Laubenfels, 1936

Genus of sponges

Amorphinopsis is a genus of sea sponges belonging to the family Halichondriidae.

== Species ==
- Amorphinopsis armata (Lindgren, 1897)
- Amorphinopsis atlantica Carvalho, Hajdu, Mothes & van Soest, 2004
- Amorphinopsis dichotoma (Dendy, 1916)
- Amorphinopsis excavans Carter, 1887
- Amorphinopsis fenestrata (Ridley, 1884)
- Amorphinopsis filigrana (Schmidt, 1862)
- Amorphinopsis fistulosa (Vacelet, Vasseur & Lévi, 1976)
- Amorphinopsis foetida (Dendy, 1889)
- Amorphinopsis kempi Kumar, 1925
- Amorphinopsis maculosa (Pulitzer-Finali, 1996)
- Amorphinopsis maza (Laubenfels, 1954)
- Amorphinopsis megarrhaphea (Lendenfeld, 1887)
- Amorphinopsis mollis Annandale, 1924
- Amorphinopsis pallescens (Topsent, 1892)
- Amorphinopsis papillata (Baer, 1906)
- Amorphinopsis sacciformis (Thiele, 1900)
- Amorphinopsis siamensis (Topsent, 1925)
- Amorphinopsis subacerata (Ridley & Dendy, 1886)
- Amorphinopsis heterostyla (Hentschel, 1912)
- Amorphinopsis megalorrhaphis (Carter, 1881)
- Amorphinopsis mertoni (Hentschel, 1912)
- Amorphinopsis oculata (Kieschnick, 1896)
- Amorphinopsis reptans (Kirkpatrick, 1903)
- Amorphinopsis spongia (de Laubenfels, 1953)
