= Breadcrumb (disambiguation) =

Bread crumbs are small particles of dry bread.

Bread crumb(s) or breadcrumb(s) may also refer to:

- Breadcrumbing, a form of manipulation
- Breadcrumbs (film), a 2016 film
- "Breadcrumbs" (Once Upon a Time), an episode of the television series Once Upon a Time
- Breadcrumb navigation, in computing, a navigation technique used in user interfaces
- Breadcrumb sponge, common name for Halichondria panicea, a species of marine demosponge

== See also ==
- Bread crumb
