= Crum =

Crum may refer to:

== People ==
- Crum (surname)

== Places ==
- Crum, Kentucky
- Crum, West Virginia
- Crum Creek
- Crum Hill

== Other uses ==
- Crumlin Road (HM Prison)
- Computational-Representational Understanding of Mind

== See also ==
- Crumb (disambiguation)
- Krumm, a surname
- Crom (fictional deity)
- Krum of Bulgaria
