= I'm Married to a... =

- Genre: Reality
- Created by: Aisha Wynn; Blaine Vess
- No. of seasons: 1

Production
- Executive producers: Vin Di Bona; Bruce Gersh; Susan Levison; Beth Greenwald; Mary Jaras; Jill Holmes; Kristen Kelly; Laurel Stier; Jeff Olde
- Producers: Vinnie Potestivo; Aisha Wynn; Blaine Vess
- Running time: 60 minutes (including commercials)
- Production companies: FishBowl Worldwide Media; Four Henrys Productions

Original release
- Network: VH1
- Release: April 21 – June 25, 2013

I'm Married to a... is a reality television show on VH1. The pilot aired on October 17, 2012 and the series premiered on April 21, 2013. The series features couples who are in unconventional marriages and relationships, including a transgender man and his girlfriend and a gay Mormon man married to a woman.

== Episodes ==
No.	Title	Original release date	U.S. viewers (millions)
1	"Cross-Dresser + Sexologist"	April 21, 2013	0.448
2	"Quadriplegic + Dominatrix"	April 28, 2013	0.318
3	"Alien Abductee + Closet Lesbian"	May 5, 2013	0.354
4	"Submissive + Big Beautiful Woman"	May 12, 2013	0.432
5	"Porn Star + Cougar"	May 21, 2013	0.472
6	"Gay Mormon + HIV"	May 28, 2013	0.450
7	"Stripper Wives + Sex Cam Star"	June 4, 2013	0.546
8	"Twins"	June 11, 2013	0.294
9	"Sex Addict + Transgender"	June 18, 2013	0.369
10	"Polyamorous + Daredevil"	June 25, 2013	0.308
