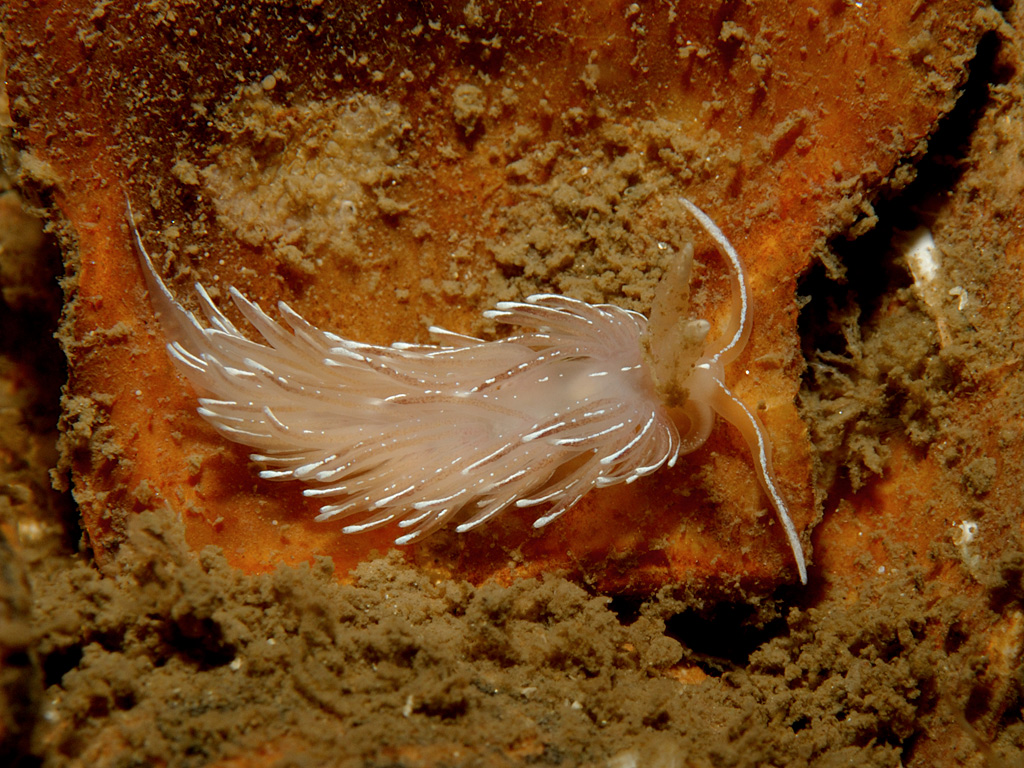
- Favorinus blianus Dundrum Bay, Co Down, Irish Sea.

Scientific classification
- Domain: Eukaryota
- Kingdom: Animalia
- Phylum: Mollusca
- Class: Gastropoda
- Order: Nudibranchia
- Suborder: Cladobranchia
- Family: Facelinidae
- Genus: Favorinus
- Species: F. blianus

Binomial name
- Favorinus blianus (Lemche & Thompson, 1974)

= Favorinus blianus =

Species of gastropod

Favorinus blianus is a species of sea slug, an aeolid nudibranch in the family Facelinidae.

== Description ==
The maximum recorded length is 30 mm.

== Distribution ==
This species was described from Pembrokeshire, Wales where it is a scarce animal. It has also been reported from Norway, England, Denmark, and Galicia, NW Spain.
