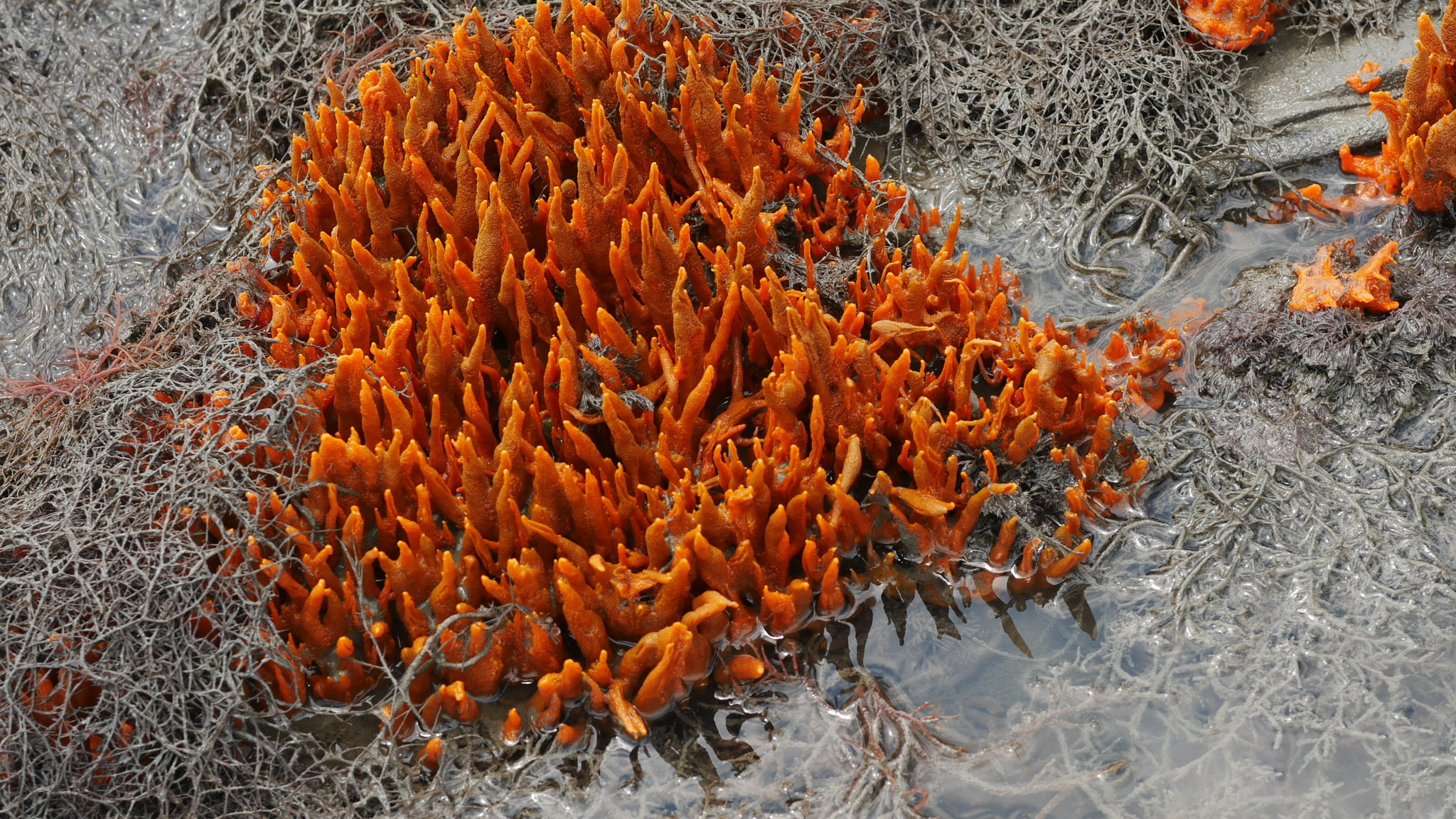
- Hymeniacidon heliophila

Scientific classification
- Domain: Eukaryota
- Kingdom: Animalia
- Phylum: Porifera
- Class: Demospongiae
- Order: Suberitida
- Family: Halichondriidae
- Genus: Hymeniacidon; Bowerbank, 1858

Species
- see text

Synonyms
- List: Amorphilla Thiele, 1898; Laxosuberites Topsent, 1896; Rhaphidostyla Burton, 1935; Rhaphoxiella Burton, 1934; Stylinos Topsent, 1891; Stylohalina Kirk, 1909; Stylotella Lendenfeld, 1888; Thieleia Burton, 1932; Uritaia Burton, 1932

= Hymeniacidon =

Genus of sponges

Hymeniacidon is a genus of sea sponges in the class Demospongiae. Some members of the genus are known to be mobile, achieving speeds of between 1 and 4 mm per day.

== Species ==
The following species are recognised in the genus Hymeniacidon:

- Hymeniacidon actites (Ristau, 1978)
- Hymeniacidon addreissiformis Dickinson, 1945
- Hymeniacidon agminata Ridley, 1884
- Hymeniacidon assimilis Levinsen, 1887
- Hymeniacidon atlantica Burton, 1948
- Hymeniacidon burtoni Van Soest & Hooper, 2020
- Hymeniacidon caerula Pulitzer-Finali, 1986
- Hymeniacidon calcifera Row, 1911
- Hymeniacidon calva (Ridley, 1881)
- Hymeniacidon centrotyla Hentschel, 1914
- Hymeniacidon chloris de Laubenfels, 1950
- Hymeniacidon conica (Kirk, 1909)
- Hymeniacidon corticata (Thiele, 1905)
- Hymeniacidon digitata (Hansen, 1885)
- Hymeniacidon dubia Burton, 1932
- Hymeniacidon dystacta de Laubenfels, 1954
- Hymeniacidon fallax Bowerbank, 1886
- Hymeniacidon fasciculata (Fristedt, 1887)
- Hymeniacidon fernandezi Thiele, 1905
- Hymeniacidon flaccida Pulitzer-Finali, 1996
- Hymeniacidon flavia Sim & Lee, 2003
- Hymeniacidon fristedti (Topsent, 1913)
- Hymeniacidon glabrata Burton, 1954
- Hymeniacidon gracilis (Hentschel, 1912)
- Hymeniacidon halichondroides (Thiele, 1898)
- Hymeniacidon heliophila Parker, 1910
- Hymeniacidon hentscheli Fernandez, Bravo-Gómez, Cárdenas & Hajdu, 2020
- Hymeniacidon iberica (Ferrer-Hernandez, 1914)
- Hymeniacidon informis (Burton, 1913)
- Hymeniacidon insutus Koltun, 1964
- Hymeniacidon kerguelensis Hentschel, 1914
- Hymeniacidon kitchingi (Burton, 1935)
- Hymeniacidon longistylus Desqueyroux, 1972
- Hymeniacidon luxurians (Lieberkuhn, 1859)
- Hymeniacidon mixta (Sara, 1958)
- Hymeniacidon ovalae Tanita & Hoshino, 1989
- Hymeniacidon perlevis (Montagu, 1818) crumb-of-bread sponge
- Hymeniacidon petrosioides Dendy, 1905
- Hymeniacidon plumigera Bowerbank, 1874
- Hymeniacidon proteus (Ridley, 1884)
- Hymeniacidon racemosa Brondsted, 1924
- Hymeniacidon reptans (Cuartas, 1991)
- Hymeniacidon rigida Dendy, 1897
- Hymeniacidon rubiginosa Thiele, 1905
- Hymeniacidon rugosa (Schmidt, 1868)
- Hymeniacidon simplex (Bowerbank, 1866)
- Hymeniacidon simplicima (Bowerbank, 1874)
- Hymeniacidon sinapium Laubenfels, 1930
- Hymeniacidon sphaerodigitata Bergquist, 1970
- Hymeniacidon stylifera (Stephens, 1915)
- Hymeniacidon sublittoralis Samaai & Gibbons, 2005
- Hymeniacidon timonovi (Rezvoi, 1931)
- Hymeniacidon torquata Topsent, 1916
- Hymeniacidon ungodon de Laubenfels, 1932
- Hymeniacidon upaonassu Fortunato, Pérez & Lôbo-Hajdu, 2020
- Hymeniacidon variospiculata Dendy, 1922
- Hymeniacidon zosterae Row, 1911
