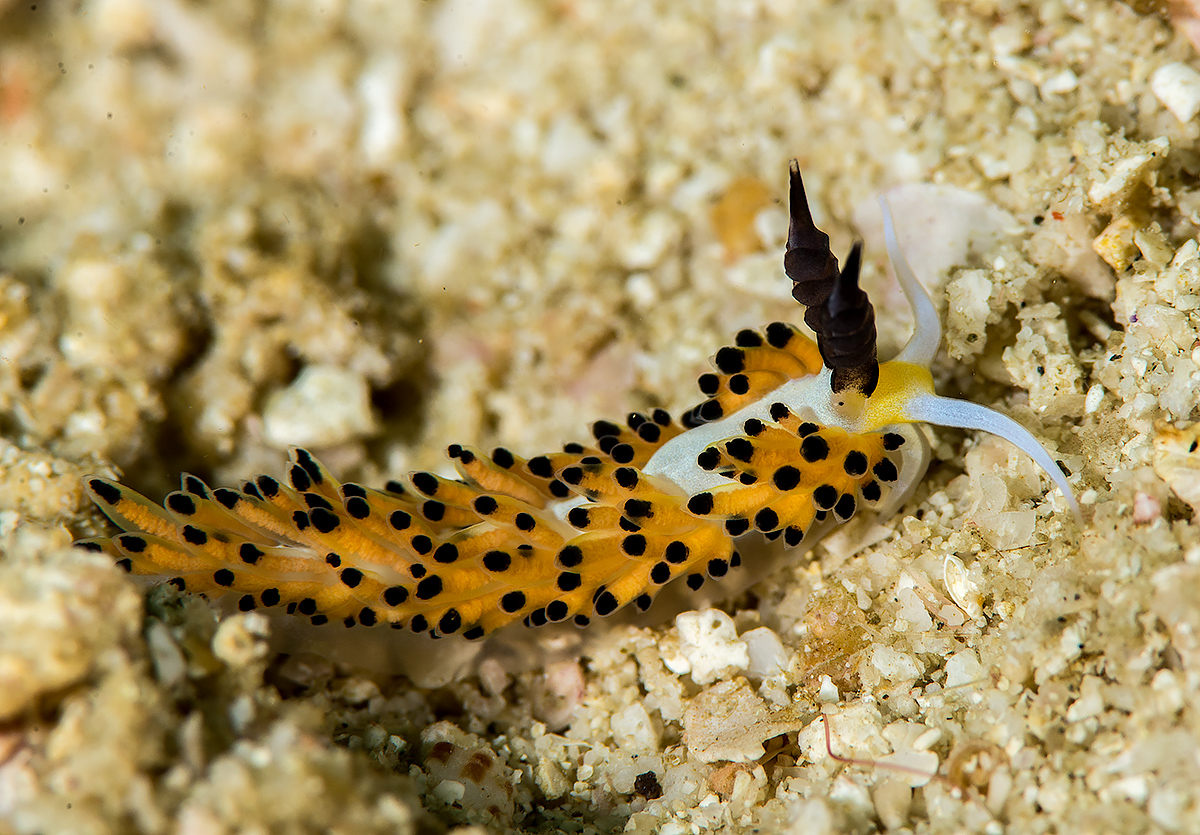
- The nudibranch Favorinus tsuruganus, Rinca, Indonesia.

Scientific classification
- Kingdom: Animalia
- Phylum: Mollusca
- Class: Gastropoda
- Order: Nudibranchia
- Suborder: Aeolidacea
- Family: Favorinidae
- Genus: Favorinus
- Species: F. tsuruganus

Binomial name
- Favorinus tsuruganus Baba & Abe, 1964

= Favorinus tsuruganus =

Species of gastropod

Favorinus tsuruganus is a species of aeolid nudibranch, a sea slug. It is a marine gastropod mollusk in the family Facelinidae.

== Description ==
Favorinus tsuruganus grows to a maximum length of 25 mm. The back and oral tentacles are opaque white and there is a yellow patch on the front of the head. The rhinophores are black, and swell in a collar-like shape in three places. The cerata have black tips with the digestive gland duct being orange, a distinguishing feature of this species.

== Distribution ==
This species occurs in Japan, more rarely in eastern Australia down to around Sydney, and has a wide western Pacific distribution.

== Diet and behaviour ==
Favorinus tsuruganus feeds on the eggs of a wide range of other opisthobranchs, in particular, Hexabranchus.
