= Crumbley =

Crumbley is an Irish surname. People with this surname include:

- Alex Crumbley (1909–1938), American baseball player
- Elmer Crumbley (1908–1993), American trombonist
- Ethan Crumbley (born 2006), American perpetrator of the Oxford High School shooting
  - James Crumbley (born 1976) and Jennifer Crumbley (born 1978), parents and collaborators of Ethan
- George Crumbley (1923–2009), American founder of the Peach Bowl

== See also ==
- Greg Crumbly, American artist
