= Crumbling =

Crumbling may refer to:

- Crumbling (album), 2018 album by Mid-Air Thief

== See also ==
- Crumb (disambiguation)
- Crumble (disambiguation)
