= Crumble (disambiguation) =

A crumble is a fruit-based dessert.

Crumble or Crumbles may also refer to:

- Eric Crumble, boxer
- The Crumbles, a shingle beach near Eastbourne
- Crumbles murders, either of two notable murder cases at The Crumbles in 1920 and 1924
- "Crumble Cap" mushroom, fungus Coprinellus disseminatus

== Food ==
- Cookie Crumble, New Zealand ice cream
- Violet Crumble, Australian chocolate bar

== Fiction ==
- Crumble, a play by Sheila Callaghan
- Crumble (Transformers), a member of the Micromasters in Transformers
- The Great Crumble, an apocalyptic pandemic in Sweet Tooth (TV series)

== Music ==
- Crumble (album), 1994 indie rock music album by Butterglory
- "Crumble", 1996 song on the indie rock album Broken Girl by Julie Doiron
- "Crumble", 2003 song on the indie rock album Feast of Wire by Calexico

== See also ==
- Crumb (disambiguation)
- Crumbling (disambiguation)
