= Topsentia =

Scientific classification
- Kingdom: Animalia
- Phylum: Porifera
- Class: Demospongiae
- Order: Suberitida
- Family: Halichondriidae
- Genus: Topsentia; Berg, 1899

Genus of sponges

Topsentia is a genus of sponges belonging to the family Halichondriidae.

The genus has cosmopolitan distribution.

== Species ==
Species:

- Topsentia amorpha Gammill, 1997
- Topsentia aqabaensis Ilan, Gugel & van Soest, 2004
- Topsentia arcotti (Ali, 1956)
- Topsentia ophiraphidites (de Laubenfels, 1934)
