= Halichondria almae =

Scientific classification
- Kingdom: Animalia
- Phylum: Porifera
- Class: Demospongiae
- Order: Suberitida
- Family: Halichondriidae
- Genus: Halichondria
- Species: H. almae

Binomial name
- Halichondria almae (Carballo, Uriz & García-Gómez, 1996)

Synonyms
- Ciocalapata almae Carballo, Uriz & García-Gómez, 1996

Species of sponge

Halichondria almae is a species of sea sponge belonging to the family Halichondriidae.
