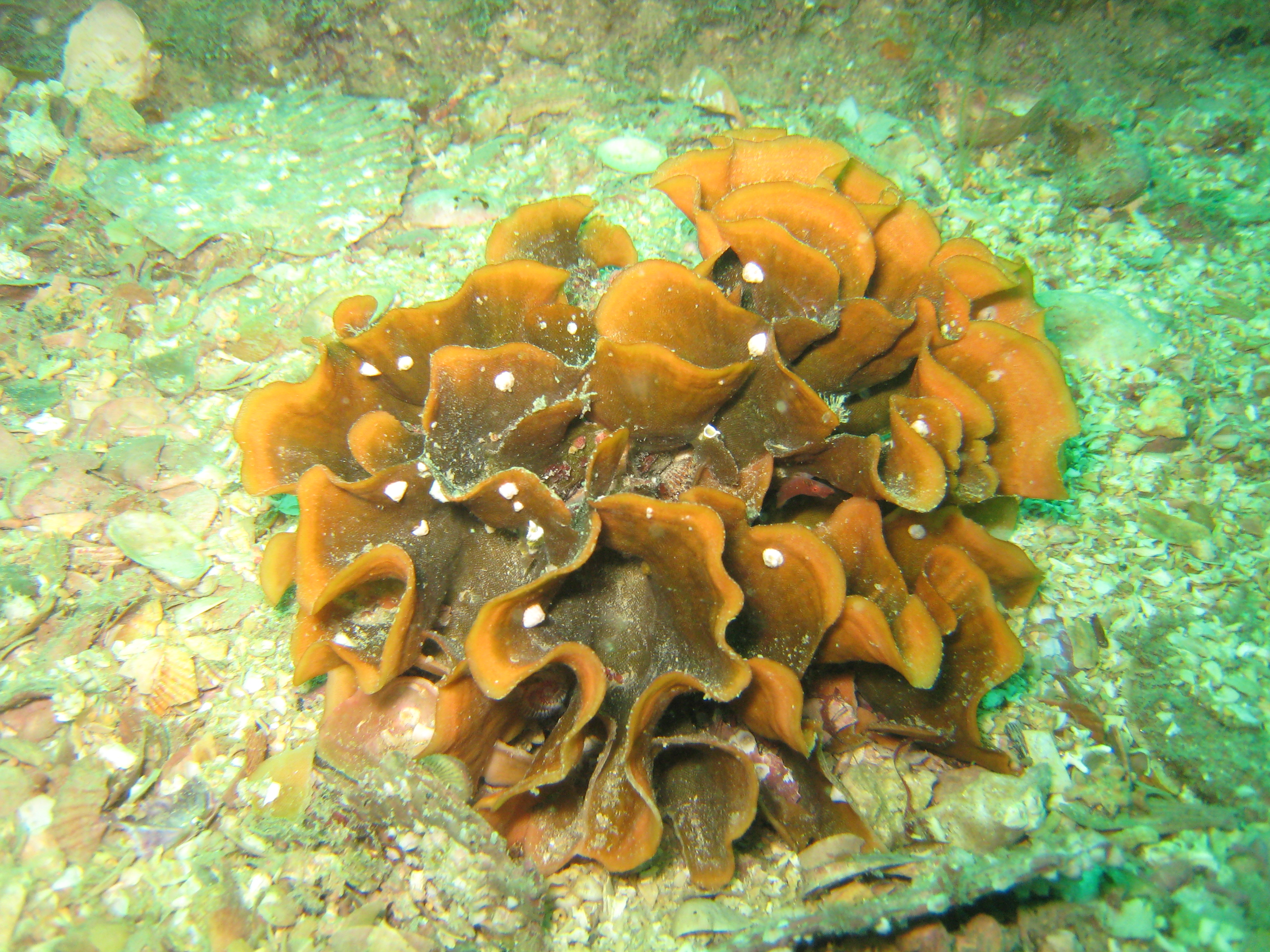
- Rose coral (Pentapora fascialis foliacea) in Saint-Quay-Portrieux

Scientific classification
- Kingdom: Animalia
- Phylum: Bryozoa
- Class: Gymnolaemata
- Order: Cheilostomatida
- Suborder: Flustrina
- Superfamily: Smittinoidea
- Family: Bitectiporidae; MacGillivray, 1895

Genera
- See text

= Bitectiporidae =

Bitectiporidae Temporal range: Eocene - Recent

Family of moss animals

The Bitectiporidae is a family within the bryozoan order Cheilostomatida. Colonies are encrusting on shells and rocks or upright bilaminar branches or sheets. The zooids generally have at least one adventitious avicularia on their frontal wall near the orifice. The frontal wall is usually covered with small pores and numerous larger pores along the margin. The ovicell, which broods the larvae internally, is double-layered with numerous pores in the outer layer, and sits quite prominently on the frontal wall of the next zooid.

== Classification ==
- Family Bitectiporidae
  - Genus Bitectipora
  - Genus Cribella
  - Genus Hippomonavella
  - Genus Hippoporina
  - Genus Hippothyris
  - Genus Kermadecazoon
  - Genus Metroperiella
  - Genus Neodakaria
  - Genus Nigrapercula
  - Genus Parkermavella
  - Genus Pentapora
  - Genus Pseudoflustra
  - Genus Schizomavella
  - Genus Schizosmittina
