= Crum (surname) =

Crum is a surname. Notable people with the surname include:

- Alexander Crum (1828–1893), Scottish printer and politician
- Alison Crum (born 1949), English viol player
- Bartley Crum (1900–1959), American lawyer
- Brian Justin Crum (born 1988), American singer
- Denny Crum (1937–2023), American basketball coach
- Dick Crum (1928–2005), American folk dancer and teacher
- Dick Crum (American football) (born 1934), former American football player and coach
- Dustin Crum (born 1999), American football player
- Eugene Crum (1953–2013), American sheriff
- Frank Crum (born 2000), American football player
- George Crum (born George Speck; ca. 1828–1914), credited by many to be the inventor of potato chips
- Humphrey Ewing Crum-Ewing (born Crum) (1802–1887), Scottish politician
- Jake Crum (born 1991), American racing driver
- Johnny Crum (1912–1969), Scottish footballer
- John Macleod Campbell Crum (1872–1958), Anglican theologian and poet, author of Now the Green Blade Rises
- Margaret Crum (1921–1986), British writer
- Matthew Crum (born 1978), American drummer
- Maurice Crum (disambiguation), multiple people
- Walter Crum (1796–1867), Scottish chemist
- Walter Ewing Crum (1865–1944), Scottish Coptologist

== See also ==
- Crumb (surname)
