= Ciocalypta =

Scientific classification
- Kingdom: Animalia
- Phylum: Porifera
- Class: Demospongiae
- Order: Suberitida
- Family: Halichondriidae
- Genus: Ciocalypta; Bowerbank, 1862

Type species
- Ciocalypta penicillus Bowerbank, 1862

Synonyms
- Coelocalypta Topsent, 1928; Collocalypta Dendy, 1905; Leucophloeus Carter, 1883; Pseudohymeniacidon Carballo, 2001

Genus of sponges

Ciocalypta is a genus of sea sponges belonging to the family Halichondriidae.

== Species ==
As of September 2020, the World Register of Marine Species lists 27 species in the genus Ciocalypta:

- Ciocalypta aciculata Carter, 1885
- Ciocalypta aderma (Lévi & Vacelet, 1958)
- Ciocalypta alba Carvalho, Carraro, Lerner & Hajdu, 2003
- Ciocalypta alleni Laubenfels, 1936
- Ciocalypta carballoi Vacelet, Bitar, Carteron, Zibrowius & Pérez, 2007
- Ciocalypta colorata Gutekunst, Müller, Pohl, Brümmer, Malik, Fawzi, Erpenbeck & Lehnert, 2018
- Ciocalypta digitata (Dendy, 1905)
- Ciocalypta expanda Tanita & Hoshino, 1989
- Ciocalypta gibbsi (Wells, Wells & Gray, 1960)
- Ciocalypta gracilis Topsent, 1897
- Ciocalypta heterostyla Hentschel, 1912
- Ciocalypta hyalina (Pulitzer-Finali, 1978)
- Ciocalypta hyaloderma Ridley & Dendy, 1886
- Ciocalypta massalis (Carter, 1883)
- Ciocalypta melichlora Sollas, 1902
- Ciocalypta microstrongylata Vacelet, Vasseur & Lévi, 1976
- Ciocalypta minuta Rezvoi, 1931
- Ciocalypta penicillus Bowerbank, 1862
- Ciocalypta polymastia (Lendenfeld, 1888)
- Ciocalypta porrecta (Topsent, 1928)
- Ciocalypta rutila Sollas, 1902
- Ciocalypta sasuensis Kang & Sim, 2008
- Ciocalypta simplex Thiele, 1900
- Ciocalypta stalagmites Hentschel, 1912
- Ciocalypta tyleri Bowerbank, 1873
- Ciocalypta vansoesti (Hooper, Cook, Hobbs & Kennedy, 1997)
- Ciocalypta weltneri Arnesen, 1920
