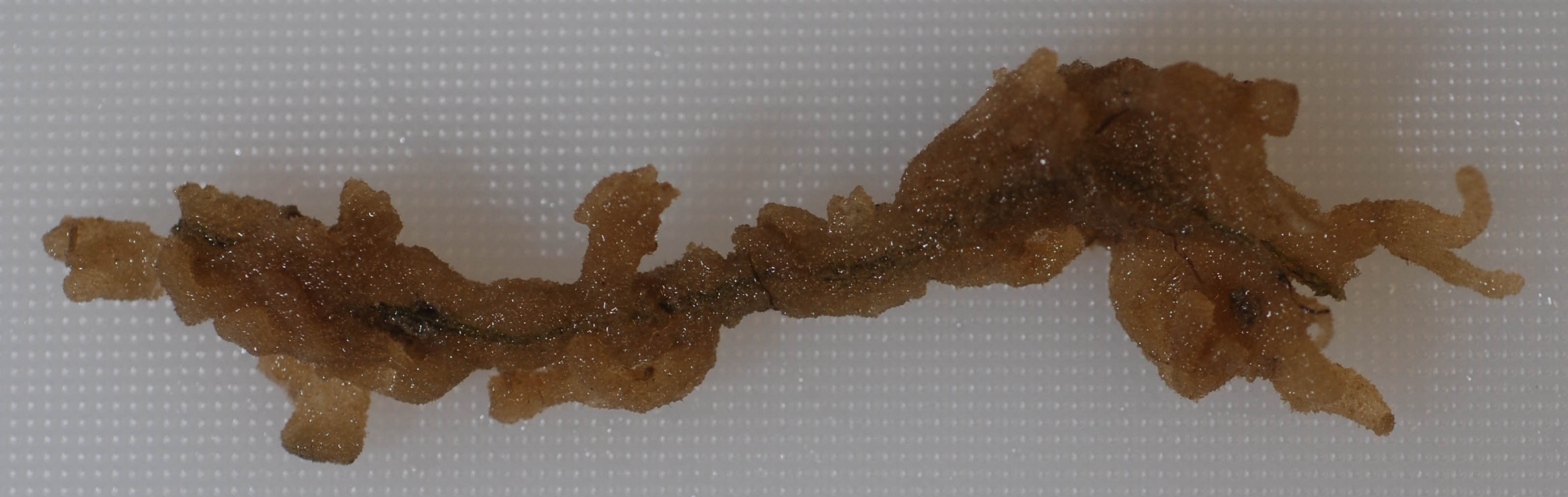
- Yellow sun sponge (Halichondria bowerbanki). Little Annemessex River, Somerset County, Maryland

Scientific classification
- Domain: Eukaryota
- Kingdom: Animalia
- Phylum: Porifera
- Class: Demospongiae
- Order: Suberitida
- Family: Halichondriidae
- Genus: Halichondria
- Species: H. bowerbanki

Binomial name
- Halichondria bowerbanki Burton, 1930

Synonyms
- List: Amorphina coalita (sensu Lamarck, 1814); Halichondria bowerbanki Burton, 1930·; Halichondria coalita (sensu Lamarck, 1814)·; Spongia coalita sensu Lamarck, 1814

= Halichondria bowerbanki =

Species of sponge

Halichondria bowerbanki, commonly known as the yellow sun sponge, is a species of sea sponge in the family Halichondriidae. It is found on rocky surfaces in the shallow subtidal, with occasional intertidal specimens under overhanging rocks. The physical appearance and structure of the species is variable and it has tassel-like irregular branches. Colonies can be up to 25 centimeters high with branches reaching 12 centimeters high. The color of the species is beige to brown in the summer, and light grey/yellow in the winter.
