= Maurice Crum =

Maurice Crum may refer to:

- Maurice Crum Sr. (born 1969), American football player
- Maurice Crum Jr. (born 1986), American football player
