= Cram.com =

Application for making and sharing flashcards

- Owner: Student Brands
- Website: www.cram.com
- Registration: Optional

Cram.com (formerly known as Flashcard Exchange) was a web-based application for creating, studying, and sharing flashcards. Users on Cram.com have created over 68 million flashcards.

== History ==
Cram.com was launched by Student Brands after it acquired FlashcardExchange.com and FlashcardDB.com.

FlashcardExchange.com was originally launched in January 2001 by Culley Harrelson.

== Usage ==
Users could create free accounts on the website to create their own flashcards. On FlashcardExchange.com, users had to pay to print and download flashcards, but all functionality on Cram was free.

Flashcards could be created in a number of languages, such as English, French, Spanish, German, Chinese, Polish, and Portuguese. Flashcards were placed into categories, including careers, language, computers, and others.

== See also ==
- List of flashcard software
