= Karm Island (Antarctica) =

Island in Antarctica

- Location within Antarctica

Geography
- Location: Antarctica
- Coordinates: 66°59′S 57°27′E
- Length: 3 km (1.9 mi)

Administration
- Administered under the Antarctic Treaty System

Demographics
- Population: Uninhabited

Karm Island is an island off the coast of Antarctica. It is 3 kilometres (1.5 nmi) long, located 2 kilometres (1 nmi) south-east of Shaula Island. Mapped by Norwegian cartographers from aerial photos taken by the Lars Christensen Expedition, 1936–37, and called Karm (coaming). The group was first visited by an ANARE (Australian National Antarctic Research Expeditions) party in 1954.

== See also ==
- List of Antarctic and sub-Antarctic islands
