= Crumb (surname) =

Crumb is an English surname.

Those bearing it include:

- George Crumb (1929–2022), composer
  - David Crumb (born 1962), composer son of George Crumb
  - Ann Crumb (1950–2019), actress daughter of George Crumb
- Jason Crumb (born 1973), Canadian football player
- Mike Crumb (born 1970), Canadian football player
- Robert Crumb (born 1943), underground comic artist
  - Charles Crumb (1942–1992), elder brother of Robert Crumb
  - Maxon Crumb (born 1945), younger brother of Robert Crumb
  - Aline Kominsky-Crumb (1948–2022), wife of Robert Crumb
  - Sophie Crumb (born 1981), daughter of Robert Crumb

== See also ==
- Crum (surname)
