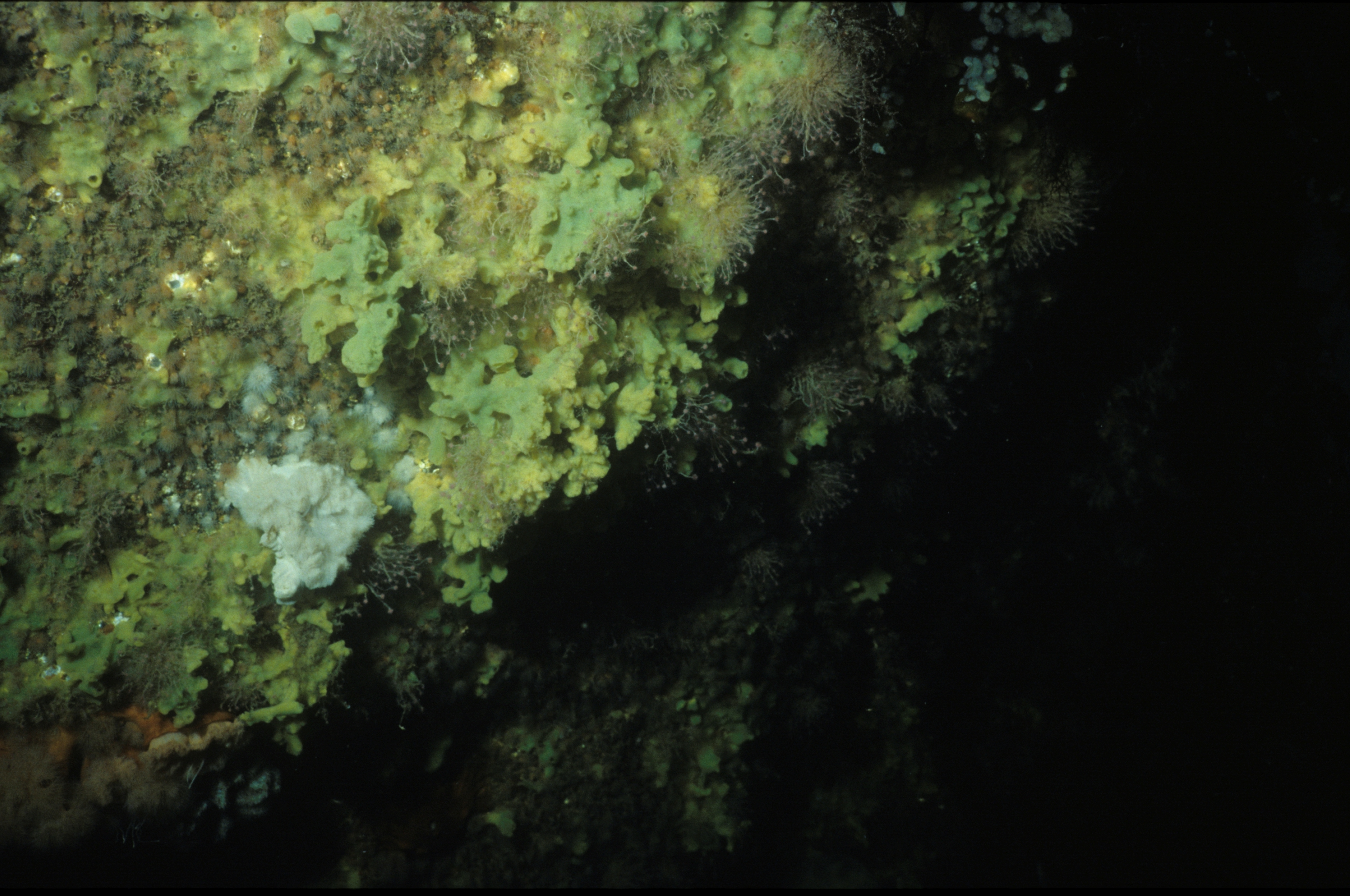

Conservation status
- Secure (NatureServe)

Scientific classification
- Kingdom: Animalia
- Phylum: Porifera
- Class: Demospongiae
- Order: Suberitida
- Family: Halichondriidae
- Genus: Halichondria
- Species: H. panicea

Binomial name
- Halichondria panicea (Pallas, 1766)

Synonyms
- List: Alcyonium manusdiaboli sensu Esper, 1794; Alcyonium medullare Lamarck, 1815; Alcyonium paniceum (Pallas, 1766); Amorphina appendiculata Schmidt, 1875; Amorphina coccinea (Bowerbank, 1861); Amorphina grisea Fristedt, 1887; Amorphina paciscens Schmidt, 1875; Amorphina panicea (Pallas, 1766); Clathria (Microciona) seriata (Grant, 1826); Clathria (Microciona) tumulosa (Bowerbank, 1882); Clathria seriata (Grant, 1826); Eumastia appendiculata (Schmidt, 1875); Halichondria albescens (Rafinesque, 1818); Halichondria ambigua Bowerbank, 1874; Halichondria bibula (Schmidt, 1870); Halichondria brettii (Bowerbank, 1866); Halichondria caduca Bowerbank, 1866; Halichondria coccinea Bowerbank, 1861; Halichondria coralloides Bowerbank, 1882; Halichondria edusa Bowerbank, 1874; Halichondria firmus (Bowerbank, 1874); Halichondria glabra Bowerbank, 1866; Halichondria grisea (Fristedt, 1887); Halichondria incerta Bowerbank, 1866; Halichondria lactea (Bowerbank, 1866); Halichondria membrana (Bowerbank, 1866); Halichondria paciscens (Schmidt, 1875); Halichondria panacea [lapsus]; Halichondria (Halichondria) panicea (Pallas, 1766); Halichondria pannosus Verrill, 1874; Halichondria papillaris (Linnaeus, 1791); Halichondria reticulata Lieberkühn, 1859; Halichondria reticulata (Bowerbank, 1866); Halichondria sevosa Johnston, 1842; Halichondria topsenti Laubenfels, 1936; Halichondriella corticata Burton, 1931; Halina panicea (Pallas, 1766); Halina papillaris (Pallas, 1766); Halispongia papillaris (Pallas, 1766); Hymeniacidon brettii Bowerbank, 1866; Hymeniacidon coccinea (Bowerbank, 1861); Hymeniacidon fallaciosus Bowerbank, 1866; Hymeniacidon firmus Bowerbank, 1874; Hymeniacidon fragilis Bowerbank, 1866; Hymeniacidon lactea Bowerbank, 1866; Hymeniacidon membrana Bowerbank, 1866; Hymeniacidon parfitti Parfitt, 1868; Hymeniacidon reticulatus Bowerbank, 1866; Hymeniacidon solidus Bowerbank, 1882; Hymeniacidon tegeticula Bowerbank, 1874; Hymeniacidon thomasii Bowerbank, 1866; Isodictya crassa Bowerbank, 1882; Isodictya perplexa Bowerbank, 1882; Menanetia minchini Topsent, 1896; Microciona tumulosa Bowerbank, 1882; Pellina bibula Schmidt, 1870; Seriatula seriata (Grant, 1826); Spongia albescens Rafinesque, 1818; Spongia compacta Sowerby, 1806; Spongia cristata Ellis & Solander, 1786; Spongia panicea Pallas, 1766; Spongia seriata Grant, 1826; Spongia tomentosa Linnaeus, 1767; Spongia urens Ellis & Solander, 1786; Spuma borealis var. tuberosa Miklucho-Maclay, 1870; Spuma borealis var. velamentosa Miklucho-Maclay, 1870; Trachyopsilla glaberrima Burton, 1931

= Halichondria panicea =

Species of sponge

Halichondria panicea, commonly known as the breadcrumb sponge, is a species of sea sponge belonging to the family Halichondriidae. It is an abundant sponge of coastal areas of the North Atlantic and the Mediterranean Sea ranging from the intertidal zone to a recorded depth of over 550 m. The breadcrumb sponge is also found in the intertidal zone of the coast of the northern part of the North Island of New Zealand. H. panicea is very tolerant of a wide range of coastal habitats, including strong currents, high salinity and exposure to powerful wave action. Its only requirement is a rocky substrate which can include small cobbles.

== Morphology ==
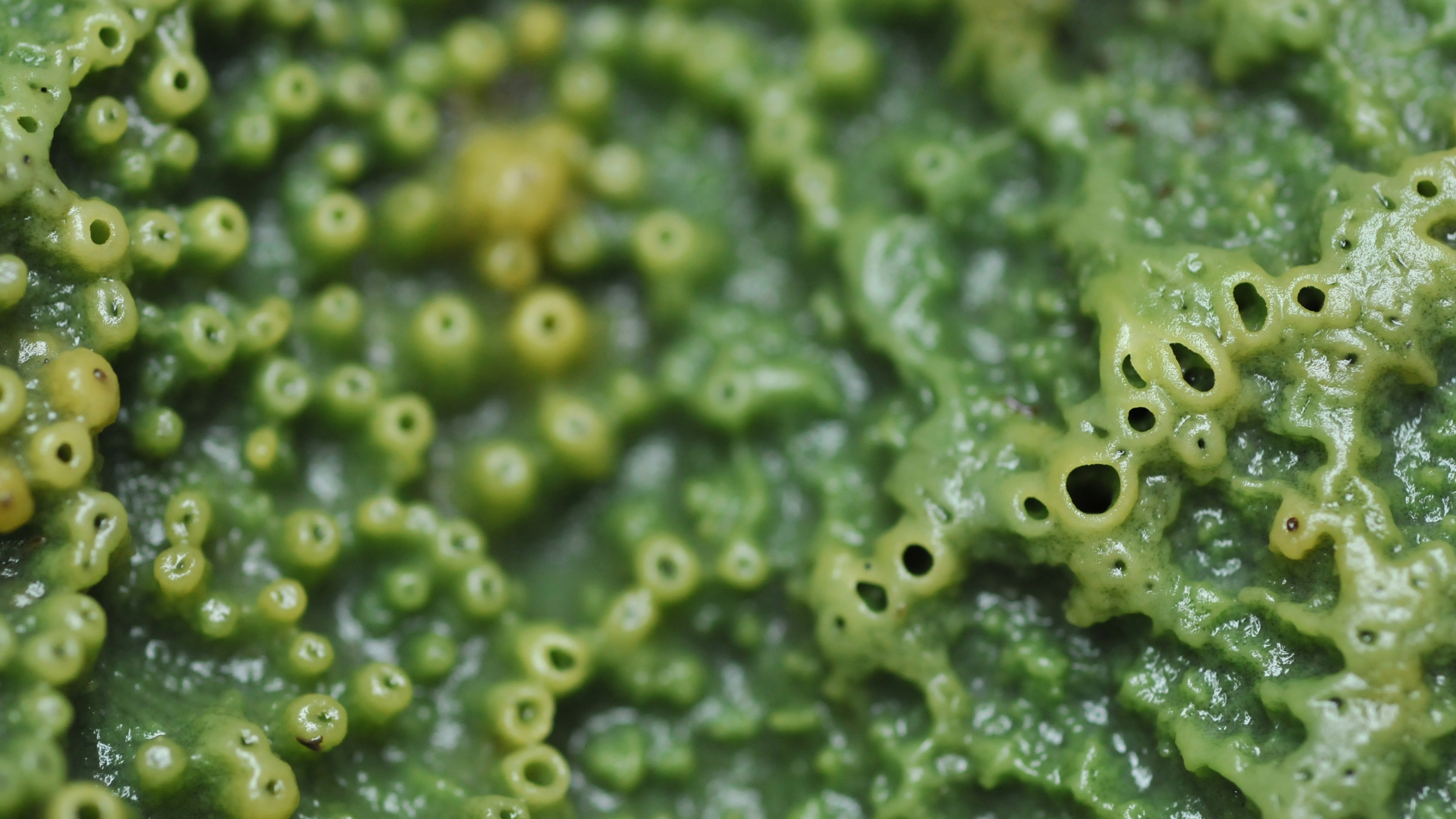
Close-up view.

Halichondria panicea occurs in a very wide range of forms and can be difficult to identify. Some forms have a granular surface which gives rise to the common name but sometimes the surface is smooth, even glassy. The surface is often marked with pores (oscula) which can extend into tubular "chimneys" in wave-sheltered habitats. The overall form is determined largely by the habitat: wave-exposed forms usually form thin widespread sheets but wave-sheltered forms often form massive encrustations up to 20 cm thick. This diversity has led to its being described as a new species 56 times (see below).

The colour is also variable. The "natural" colour is cream or grey: this is usually found in specimens from relatively deep water. However at shallower depths, the sponge is usually green due to symbiotic algae which live close to the surface of the sponge. At intermediate depths the sponge tends to be green in summer, cream or grey in winter. It smells like "exploded gunpowder".

== Biology ==
Halichondria panicea is a suspension feeder feeding mainly on phytoplankton. For such a common species, relatively little is known about its reproduction: It appears to be a hermaphrodite and oogenesis has been reported as occurring in a very narrow timeband within a single population although exceptions have been observed.

== Other names ==
When the World Register of Marine Species was created, it was discovered that no less than 56 Latin names had been assigned to this species over the years, because of confusion caused by the many different forms it might take.
