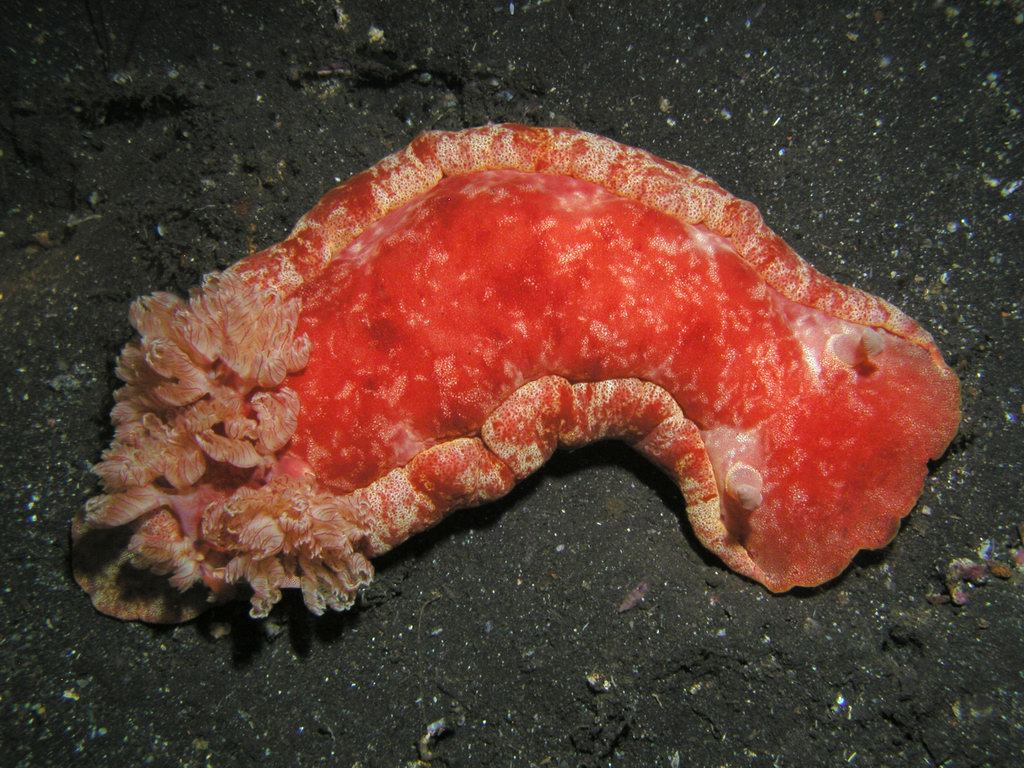
- Hexabranchus lacer, 90 mm in length, photographed at night in Bali

Scientific classification
- Kingdom: Animalia
- Phylum: Mollusca
- Class: Gastropoda
- Order: Nudibranchia
- Family: Hexabranchidae; Bergh, 1891
- Genus: Hexabranchus; Ehrenberg, 1831

Diversity
- 6 species

= Hexabranchus =

Hexabranchidae

Family of gastropods

Hexabranchidae is a family of colourful nudibranchs (often called "sea slugs") which contains only a single genus, Hexabranchus, with six species.

This family is one of the many families of dorid nudibranchs in the suborder Doridina, named after Doris, who was a sea nymph in ancient Greek mythology.

The genus contains one of the largest known species of nudibranch in the world, H. giganteus, which grows up to or exceeding 50 cm in length. Hexabranchus sanguineus is known to use chemical defenses derived from the sponge it eats and uses the chemical compounds to defend itself from potential fish predators.

== Species ==
There are six species within the genus Hexabranchus:

- Hexabranchus aureomarginatus Ostergaard, 1955
- Hexabranchus giganteus Tibiriçá, Pola & Cervera, 2023
- Hexabranchus lacer (Cuvier, 1804)
- Hexabranchus morsomus Ev. Marcus & Er. Marcus, 1962
- Hexabranchus sandwichensis Gray, 1850
- Hexabranchus sanguineus (Ruppell & Leuckart, 1828) - synonym: Hexabranchus praetextus Ehrenberg, 1828 - type species
