= KRAM-LP =

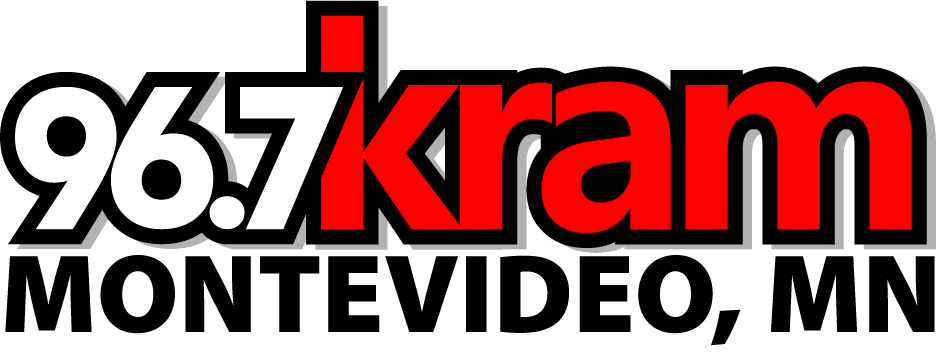
- Montevideo, Minnesota; United States
- Broadcast area: Montevideo and the immediate surrounding areas
- Frequency: 96.7 MHz
- Branding: 96.7 KRAM

Programming
- Format: Modern adult contemporary; adult album alternative

Ownership
- Owner: Thunderhawk Broadcasting Inc.

History
- First air date: July 30, 2004
- Former call signs: KKRM-LP (2003–2017)
- Call sign meaning: "Kool Radio And Music"

Technical information
- Licensing authority: FCC
- Facility ID: 126323
- Class: L1
- ERP: 100 watts
- HAAT: 14.5 meters (48 ft)
- Transmitter coordinates: 44°57′23″N 95°44′51″W

Links
- Public license information: LMS
- Webcast: Listen Live!
- Website: 967kram.com

KRAM-LP (96.7 FM) is a radio station broadcasting a modern adult contemporary and adult album alternative (AAA or "Triple-A") music format. Licensed to Montevideo, Minnesota, United States, the station is currently owned by Thunderhawk Broadcasting Inc.

The station was founded by two local high school students who applied for an LPFM license and got it. They put their station on the air as KKRM-LP in July 2004. The station changed its call sign to KRAM-LP on September 22, 2017. Currently, KRAM broadcasts from their downtown Montevideo studio.

== History ==
KRAM was the idea of two high-schoolers, Josiah Christoffer and Jacob Niemand who, after building a makeshift studio, signed on KRAM in Montevideo, Minnesota as an unlicensed radio station, on CB Radio channel 2 in June 1997 as KKCB. (This venture was not related to KKCB, a country music station in Duluth, Minnesota.) The two would eventually begin brain storming a new radio station radio station name, as KKCB was already taken. The two would agree on the new name, KRAM, which stood for "Kool Radio And Music". The two would "broadcast" live events happening in the Montevideo area. In summer of 1998, KRAM would move to 161.760 MHz, which was close enough to receive with weather band radios and scanners. Later in summer 1998, KRAM would move to the AM dial on 1560 kHz. After constructing a new 37 foot mast in May 1999, KRAM would move to the FM band at 98.3 MHz.

After the Federal Communications Commission (FCC) approved LPFM (low power FM) radio in 2000, KRAM would apply for a LPFM license, and after experiencing a few setbacks, the station was granted a license at FM 96.7 MHz on May 22, 2003, and within a month the callsign KKRM-LP was reserved for the station. (The callsign KRAM was taken at the time.) On July 30, 2004, at 7pm, KKRM-LP signed on the airwaves from the Top Of the Mall building with a modern adult contemporary format, branded as "KRAM 96 FM". Eventually, KKRM-LP would rebrand as "KRAM 96.7". In 2006, KKRM-LP would relocate its studios to 114 South 2nd Street. In 2008, KKRM-LP would move its studios to 109 North 1st Street. On September 22, 2017, after the radio station that held the KRAM callsign at the time went off the air and was deleted by the FCC, KKRM-LP would change its callsign to KRAM-LP. Around this time, KRAM-LP would rebrand as "96.7 KRAM" while shifting to a hot adult contemporary format. KRAM-LP would eventually revert to its previous modern AC and adult album alternative format.
