= Pentapora =

Scientific classification
- Kingdom: Animalia
- Phylum: Bryozoa
- Class: Gymnolaemata
- Order: Cheilostomatida
- Family: Bitectiporidae
- Genus: Pentapora; Fischer, 1807

Genus of moss animals

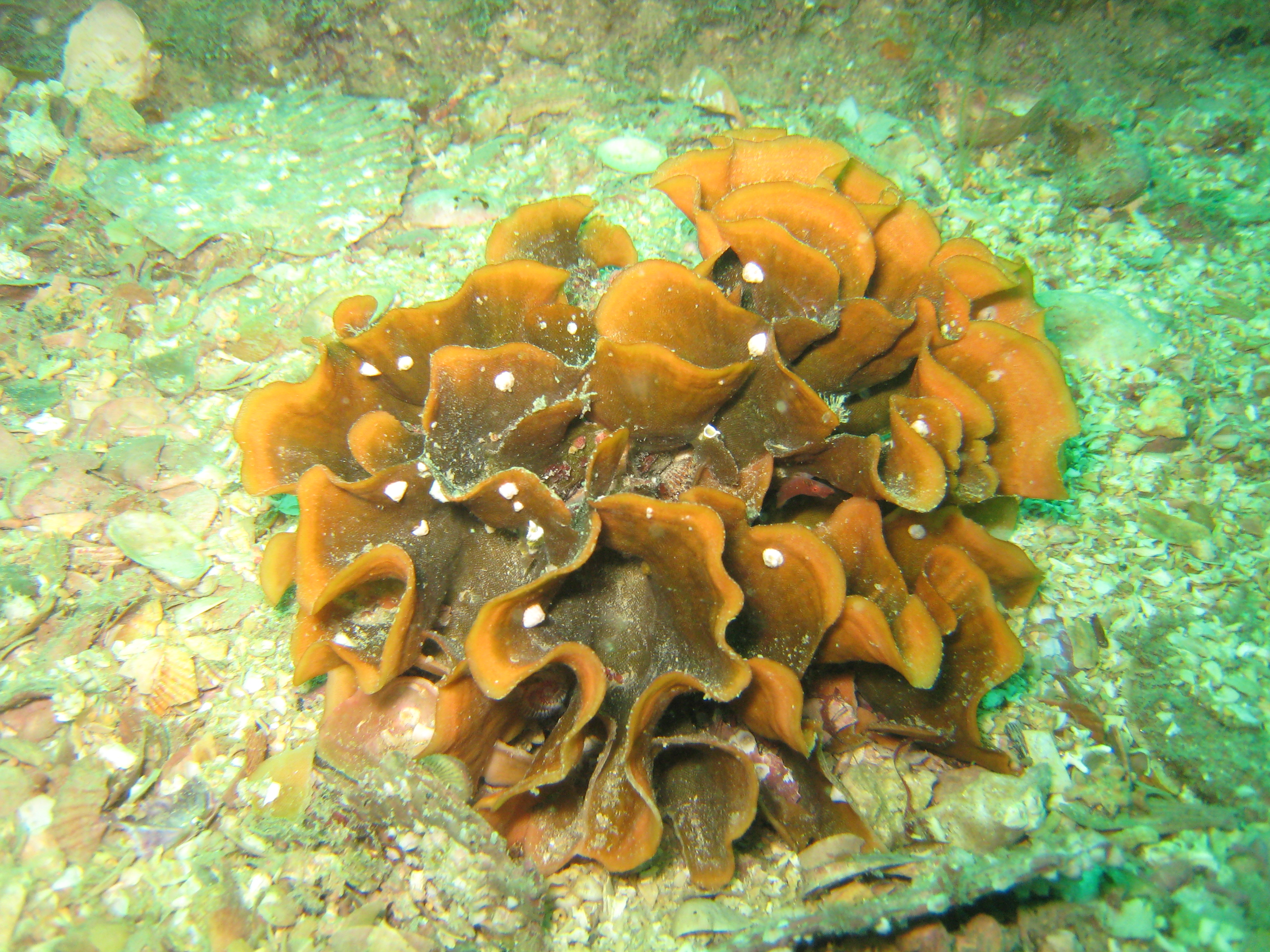
Pentapora fascialis in Saint-Quay-Portrieux

Pentapora is a small genus of bryozoans in the family Bitectiporidae.

== Species ==
The World Register of Marine Species lists the following species:

- Pentapora americana (Verrill, 1875)
- Pentapora fascialis (Pallas, 1766)
- Pentapora foliacea (Ellis & Solander, 1786)
- Pentapora ottomuelleriana (Moll, 1803)
- Pentapora tubulata Fischer, 1807 (species dubia)
