= Cram (software) =

- Developer(s): SimpleLeap Software Collaborators, Patrick Chukwura and Ashli Norton
- Stable release: 1.1 / August 1, 2009; 15 years ago
- Operating system: OS X, iOS
- Platform: Macintosh (PowerPC & x86), iPhone, iPod Touch, iPad (ARM)
- Type: Flashcard
- License: Shareware
- Website: www.simpleleap.com

Cram is an application for Apple's OS X and iOS developed by Patrick Chukwura and Ashli Norton of SimpleLeap Software.

The software is a flashcard application that allows users to prepare for various types of subject matter using flashcards and multiple-choice tests. By entering the question and answer of the test in Cram, the application presents the information in test or flashcard format, which then allows the user to study the entered information at any time.

Apart from the core functionality of Cram, other features of the application include the use of images and sound that are integrated on the flashcard and practice tests as they study and test database that allows the user to download and share tests with other users.

Cram also provides functions to study from an iPhone with flashcards and multiple-choice tests.

Cram is available as shareware, which will block itself after creating five tests with five questions each.

== See also ==
- List of flashcard software
