= Cobocards =

Web application for creating and sharing flashcards

CoboCards is a web application for creation, study and sharing of flashcards. They also provide mobile application for Android and iOS mobile devices, to help study of flashcards on the move.

Based on the freemium model, CoboCards provides users a free account with two card sets compared to paid subscription with premium features such as unlimited card sets, Leitner system based trainer and collaborative learning.

== History ==
CoboCards is a project of Jamil Soufan and Tamim Swaid. Tamim Swaid has developed the concept and interface of a collaboratively usable e-learning platform in his diploma thesis at the University of Applied Sciences in February 2007. In January 2010 they founded the CoboCards GmbH (limited company) together with Ali Yildirim.

CoboCards is supported by its strategic partners Prof. Schroeder (RWTH Aachen University), Prof. Oliver Wrede (University for Applied Sciences Aachen) and Prof. Klaus Gasteier (University of Arts Berlin).

With the idea of creating and studying flashcards online and offering an active control of learning progress they won the start2grow business idea competition in September 2009 (€25.000 ).

Additionally CoboCards was funded by German Authorities with approximately €100.000 .
