= Brainscape =

Company that develops web and mobile flashcard applications

- Type: Private
- Industry: Education
- Founded: 2010
- Founder: Andrew Cohen
- Headquarters: New York City, United States
- Area served: International
- Services: Electronic flashcards various study modes collaborative editing tools teacher dashboards
- Number of employees: 11–50
- Website: https://www.brainscape.com

Brainscape is a web and mobile education platform that allows students to study adaptive flashcards. The website and mobile application allow students, teachers, and corporate trainers to create (or upload) electronic flashcards, and to find flashcards created by other users and publishers around the world. Brainscape flashcards and marketing content are also created by expert educators and publishers with whom Brainscape closely partners to create flashcards aligned to strict instructional guidelines. Flashcards are all stored in the cloud and can be shared with groups of other learners.

Brainscape uses spaced repetition, which has been shown to increase rate of learning. Users rates their confidence in each flashcard, on a scale of 1-5, which subsequently determines how frequently to repeat the flashcard. Lower-confidence items are repeated more frequently until the user upgrades their confidence rating, thereby creating an optimized study stream. This is a technique called confidence-based repetition (CBR). Brainscape has published a white paper, which cites academic studies proving the viability of the cognitive science research that it applies in this technology, including how Brainscape features use active recall and metacognition.

== History ==
The idea for Brainscape arose when its founder, Andrew S. Cohen, was attempting to study Spanish and French while living in Panama and Martinique from 2005 to 2007. When Rosetta Stone and other educational resources were not working efficiently enough for him, Cohen created a Microsoft Excel program that would quiz him on individual vocabulary words and verb conjugations, then repeat those concepts within an interval of time that felt appropriate to his pace of learning.

Cohen later followed this interest by pursuing a master's degree in education technology from Columbia University, where he focused his graduate research on the concept of CBR and built a more complete prototype using the Java programming language. In 2010, he partnered with Andy Lutz, former vice-president of product from The Princeton Review, and he began seeking venture capital and was able to raise over $3 million, in three tranches, by 2015.

== Services ==
Brainscape provides services including electronic flashcards, various study modes, collaborative editing tools, and teacher dashboards, via its website and iPhone, iPad and Android applications.

== See also ==
- Spaced repetition software
