= Greg Crumbly =

American painter

Gregory Louis Crumbly is an American portrait artist.

== Early life ==
Gregory Crumbly was born and raised in Erie, Pennsylvania. At age 12, Crumbly fell off his bike and impaled his right hand on a shattered bottle. He severed a tendon and was in a cast for one year. His doctor told him his hand would curl into a claw if he didn't write or draw to regain movement. He hated to write, so he started drawing family portraits. He attended the Governor's School of the Arts at Bucknell University after graduating first in a high school class of 4,500. He graduated from Bucknell in 1980, with a degree in Psychology and Art History

== Career ==
Crumbly joined the United States Army and took ranger training. He retired from the United States Army Rangers in 1988, after his helicopter was shot down. He joined the Pittsburgh Police Department and served as a forensic detective until 1997. His drawings were hung in police stations throughout the city of Pittsburgh, helping to identify and capture criminals. In 1994, he was shot in the leg while tussling with a suspect, resulting in eight leg operations, and no kneecap. The shooting kept Crumbly, 45, from getting out in the field. In 1999, a case brought him to Tampa, Florida, where he decided to retire.

He has created paintings that were exhibited nationally and internationally. In 2017, he published Black Heroes Through History, illustrating his best pieces. It was accepted into the Hillsborough County School System. Works from the book are on display at the Saint Petersburg Museum of Fine Arts and the Pentagon Hall of Heroes.

== Artist life ==
His art work is held by the Pentagon Hall of Heroes and the Saint Petersburg Museum of History. His portraits were gifted to leaders including the Prime Minister of Kenya Uhuru Muigai Kenyatta and Pope Benedict. Crumbly was commissioned by the National Rifle Association of America to paint Freedom Stand Tall and Legends of the Gun. He painted a portrait of Matt Kenseth for Roush Racing. The Basketball Hall of Fame commissioned Crumbly to paint Meadowlark Lemon. Crumbly donated many of his pieces to Veteran families, institutions.
