= Crumley Chapel, Alabama =

Unincorporated community in Alabama, United States

- Unincorporated community
- Location within Alabama Location within the United States
- Coordinates: 33°34′14″N 86°54′46″W
- Country: United States
- State: Alabama
- County: Jefferson
- Elevation: 604 ft (184 m)
- Time zone: UTC-6 (Central (CST))
  - Summer (DST): UTC-5 (CDT)
- Area codes: 205, 659
- GNIS feature ID: 116930

Crumley Chapel, also known as Crumleys Chapel or Oakwood, is an unincorporated community in Jefferson County, Alabama northwest of Birmingham. The area was first settled in early 1840. The community's name originated from a local church and cemetery, which were named after Robert Crumley, an early farmer of the area.

Crumley Chapel Methodist Church was founded in 1859. The Crumley Chapel Cemetery was founded in 1858 and dedicated to Oliver Shoemaker and his wife. Shoemaker donated the land for the cemetery.

Ernie Pyle, during his time as a roving reporter, reported on the bitter feud over the attempt to rename the town. He reported in March 1939 that since November 1938 there had been animosity and even some violence about it. At that time the replacement name was "Westwood". Pyle half-jokingly suggested a truce with the compromise name of "Crumwood", knowing that the feuders would probably not take his advice.
