= BNED =

Bookstore chain

Barnes & Noble Education, Inc.
- Type: Public
- Traded as: NYSE: BNED; S&P 600 component
- Predecessor: Corporate spin-off from Barnes & Noble, Inc.
- Founded: August 3, 2015; 10 years ago
- Headquarters: Florham Park, New Jersey, United States
- Number of locations: 653 physical stores (2025); 493 virtual stores (2025)
- Key people: Jonathan Shar (CEO)
- Brands: Yuzu digital textbook platform
- Revenue: ▲US$1.61 billion (2025)
- Operating income: ▲US$15.9 million (2025)
- Net income: ▼US$−102 million (2023)
- Total assets: ▼US$980 million (2023)
- Total equity: ▼US$131 million (2023)
- Number of employees: 4,620 (2023)
- Divisions: Barnes & Noble College; MBS Textbook Exchange
- Website: bned.com

Barnes & Noble Education, Inc. (doing business as BNED, after its New York Stock Exchange ticker symbol) is one of the largest operators of college bookstores in the United States. As of the end of 2020, Barnes & Noble Education operated 760 campus bookstores and school-branded e-commerce sites through its Barnes & Noble College Booksellers division. The company is headquartered in Florham Park, New Jersey.

BNED was part of the Barnes & Noble national retail bookstore chain until 2015, when Barnes & Noble separated its higher-education operation from its retail trade stores and Nook brand ebook operation.

The company's main competitor in the management of on-campus college bookstores industry is Follett. Together, BNED and Follett operate more than half of all college bookstores in the United States. It is not unusual for college campuses to replace their bookstore operators with their main rival after the current store management contracts expires.

== History ==
In February 2015, Barnes & Noble had announced plans to spin off its college bookstore assets and create a separate company called Barnes & Noble Education. On August 3, 2015, Barnes & Noble Education, Inc. began trading on the New York Stock Exchange under the ticker symbol, "BNED". The company operates stores dedicated to selling college textbooks, both on and off campus.

In June 2016, Barnes & Noble Education completed the acquisition of Promoversity, a custom merchandise supplier and e-commerce business that works with the collegiate bookstore business and its customers.

In February 2017, Barnes & Noble Education had acquired MBS Textbook Exchange, a major textbook distributor based in Columbia, Missouri, for $174.2 million in cash.

By December 2018, Barnes & Noble Education had operated or managed 773 campus bookstores under contracts. Two years later, Barnes & Noble Education operated 760 campus bookstores and school-branded e-commerce sites through its Barnes & Noble College Booksellers division at the end of 2020.

In July 2019, BNED revealed that the company had turned down several offers by California-based Bay Capital Finance to take over the company citing that the offers by Bay Capital were "substantially undervalued BNED, were highly conditional and not credible." Unlike its former parent company, BNED was diversifying its business by the acquisition of many digital services companies to increase the number of services offered by its Digital Student Solutions division during its past four years as an independent company.

In January 2020, a class-action antitrust lawsuit was filed against BNED, along with rival Follett as well as college textbook companies Cengage, McGraw-Hill Education, and Pearson, alleging that so-called "inclusive access" programs, which involve automatically billing students for course materials, constituted a conspiracy of which the "end goal and result is eliminating competitors and raising prices." In June 2021, the case was dismissed by District Judge Denise Cote.

=== Digital Student Solutions division ===
In March 2016, Barnes & Noble Education enlarged their Digital Student Solutions online services division by acquiring LoudCloud Systems, a digital platform and analytics provider to clients in higher education, the for-profit sector, and K-12 segment.

In August 2017, Barnes & Noble Education acquired Student Brands for $58.5 million.

In August 2018, Barnes & Noble Education acquired PaperRater, a service that helps students write papers and identify plagiarism.
