= KRAM =

West Klamath, Oregon; United States
- Frequency: 1070 kHz

Programming
- Format: Defunct

Ownership
- Owner: Scott D. MacArthur, personal representative of the estate of Sandra A. Falk

History
- First air date: 1989
- Last air date: July 1, 2006
- Former call signs: KWSA (1985–1997)

Technical information
- Facility ID: 71966
- Class: D
- Power: 5,000 watts (day); 1,000 watts (critical hours)
- Transmitter coordinates: 42°11′38″N 121°46′27″W

KRAM (1070 AM) was a radio station licensed to serve West Klamath, Oregon, United States. The station, established in 1989, was owned by Scott D. MacArthur, personal representative of the estate of Sandra A. Falk. KRAM fell silent in July 2006 and was deleted from the FCC database in February 2010.

== Programming ==
Before falling silent in July 2006, KRAM broadcast a nostalgia music radio format branded as "The Ram".

== History ==
This station received its original construction permit from the Federal Communications Commission on June 6, 1985. The FCC assigned the new station the KWSA call sign on October 23, 1985. KWSA received its license to cover from the FCC on June 7, 1989.

In September 1996, Western States Broadcasting reached an agreement to sell this station to Sandra Ann Falk. The deal was approved by the FCC on December 16, 1996, and the transaction was consummated on January 9, 1997. The new owner had the FCC change the station's legal call sign to KRAM on May 1, 1997.

Station owner Sandra Ann Falk died on June 23, 2006, and the station fell silent on July 1, 2006. Scott D. MacArthur filed an application with the FCC in July 2007 to have the broadcast license involuntarily transferred to him as the personal representative of the estate of Sandra Ann Falk. The transfer was approved by the FCC on August 8, 2007. MacArthur, in an August 2007 filing with the FCC, declared his intention to sell KRAM to a third party to "allow the estate to pay creditors, including local merchants and the state of Oregon." However, by February 2010 the station had not yet been sold. On February 24, 2010, the FCC dismissed the long-standing application for authorization to remain silent, declared the station's broadcast license forfeit, and deleted the KRAM call sign from the broadcast database.
