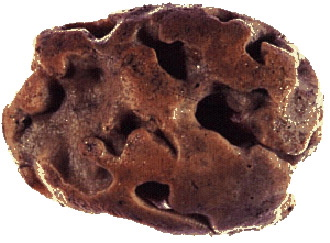
- Halichondria panicea

Scientific classification
- Kingdom: Animalia
- Phylum: Porifera
- Class: Demospongiae
- Order: Suberitida
- Family: Halichondriidae; Gray, 1867

Genera
- See text

Synonyms
- List: Ciocalyptidae Hentschel, 1923; Hymeniacidonidae Laubenfels, 1936; Stylotellinae Lendenfeld, 1888

= Halichondriidae =

Family of sponges

Halichondriidae is a family of sea sponges belonging to the order Suberitida. These sponges have a skeleton consisting of dense bundles of spicules occurring in a more or less random pattern.

== Genera ==
The following genera are recognised in the family Halichondriidae:

- Amorphinopsis Carter, 1887
- Axinyssa Lendenfeld, 1897
- Ciocalapata Laubenfels, 1936
- Ciocalypta Bowerbank, 1862
- Cryptax de Laubenfels, 1954
- Epipolasis Laubenfels, 1936
- Halichondria Fleming, 1828
- Hymeniacidon Bowerbank, 1858
- Johannesia Gerasimova, Erpenbeck & Plotkin, 2008
- Laminospongia Pulitzer-Finali, 1983
- Sarcomella Schmidt, 1868
- Semisuberites Carter, 1877
- Spongosorites Topsent, 1896
- Topsentia Berg, 1899
- Vosmaeria Fristedt, 1885
