= Motor learning =

Movements that reflect nervous system changes

Motor learning refers broadly to changes in an organism's movements that reflect changes in the structure and function of the nervous system. Motor learning occurs over varying timescales and degrees of complexity: humans learn to walk or talk over the course of years, but continue to adjust to changes in height, weight, strength etc. over their lifetimes. Motor learning enables animals to gain new skills, and improves the smoothness and accuracy of movements, in some cases by calibrating simple movements like reflexes. Motor learning research often considers variables that contribute to motor program formation (i.e., underlying skilled motor behaviour), sensitivity of error-detection processes, and strength of movement schemas (see motor program). Motor learning is "relatively permanent", as the capability to respond appropriately is acquired and retained. Temporary gains in performance during practice or in response to some perturbation are often termed motor adaptation, a transient form of learning. Neuroscience research on motor learning is concerned with which parts of the brain and spinal cord represent movements and motor programs and how the nervous system processes feedback to change the connectivity and synaptic strengths. At the behavioral level, research focuses on the design and effect of the main components driving motor learning, i.e. the structure of practice and the feedback. The timing and organization of practice can influence information retention, e.g. how tasks can be subdivided and practiced (also see varied practice), and the precise form of feedback can influence preparation, anticipation, and guidance of movement.

== Behavioural approach ==
=== Structure of practice and contextual interference ===
Contextual interference was originally defined as "function interference in learning responsible for memory improvement". Contextual interference effect is "the effect on learning of the degree of functional interference found in a practice situation when several tasks must be learned and are practiced together". Variability of practice (or varied practice) is an important component to contextual interference, as it places task variations within learning. Although varied practice may lead to poor performance throughout the acquisition phase, it is important for the development of the schemata, which is responsible for the assembly and improved retention and transfer of motor learning.

Despite the improvements in performance seen across a range of studies, one limitation of the contextual interference effect is the uncertainty with regard to the cause of performance improvements as so many variables are constantly manipulated. In a review of literature, the authors identify that there were few patterns to explain the improvements in experiments that use the contextual interference paradigm. Although there were no patterns in the literature, common areas and limitations that justified interference effects were identified:

1. Although the skills being learned required whole-body movements, most tasks had a common feature; they all contained components that could be isolated.
2. Most of the studies supporting interference effect used slow movements that enabled movement adjustments during movement execution.
3. According to some authors bilateral transfer may be elicited through alternate practice conditions, as a source of information can develop from both sides of the body. Despite improvements seen in these studies, interference effects would not be attributed to their improvements, and it would have been a coincidence of task characteristics and schedule of practice.
4. The terminology of "complex skills" has not been well defined. Procedural manipulations, which vary between experiments (e.g., changing the similarity between tasks) has been cited as a contributor to skill complexity.

=== Feedback given during practice ===
Feedback is regarded as a critical variable for skill acquisition and is broadly defined as any kind of sensory information related to a response or movement. Intrinsic feedback is response-produced — it occurs normally when a movement is made and the sources may be internal or external to the body. Typical sources of intrinsic feedback include vision, proprioception and audition. Extrinsic feedback is augmented information provided by an external source, in addition to intrinsic feedback. Extrinsic feedback is sometimes categorized as knowledge of performance or knowledge of results.

Several studies have manipulated the presentation features of feedback information (e.g., frequency, delay, interpolated activities, and precision) in order to determine the optimal conditions for learning. See Figure 4, Figure 6, and summary Table 1 for a detailed explanation of feedback manipulation and knowledge of results (see below).

==== Knowledge of performance ====
Knowledge of performance (KP) or kinematic feedback refers to information provided to a performer, indicating the quality or patterning of their movement. It may include information such as displacement, velocity or joint motion. KP tends to be distinct from intrinsic feedback and more useful in real-world tasks. It is a strategy often employed by coaches or rehabilitation practitioners.

==== Knowledge of results ====
Knowledge of results (KR) is defined as extrinsic or augmented information provided to a performer after a response, indicating the success of their actions with regard to an environmental goal. KR may be redundant with intrinsic feedback, especially in real-world scenarios. However, in experimental studies, it refers to information provided over and above those sources of feedback that are naturally received when a response is made (i.e., response-produced feedback; Typically, KR is also verbal or verbalizable. The impact of KR on motor learning has been well-studied and some implications are described below.

===== Experimental design and knowledge of results =====
Often, experimenters fail to separate the relatively permanent aspect of change in the capability for responding (i.e. indicative of learning) from transient effects (i.e. indicative of performance). In order to account for this, transfer designs have been created which involve two distinct phases. To visualize the transfer design, imagine a 4x4 grid. The column headings may be titled "Experiment #1" and "Experiment #2" and indicate the conditions you wish to compare. The row headings are titled "Acquisition" and "Transfer" whereby:

1. The acquisition block (2 columns) contains the test conditions in which some variable is manipulated (i.e. different levels of KR applied) and different groups receive different treatments. This block represents the transient effects of KR (i.e. performance)
2. The transfer block (2 columns) contains the test conditions in which that variable is held constant (i.e. a common level of KR applied; normally a no-KR condition). When presented with a no-KR condition, this block represents the persistent effects of KR (i.e. learning). Conversely, if this block is given to subjects in a format where KR is available, transient and persistent effects of KR are convoluted and it is argued not interpretable for learning effects.

After a rest period, the change in the capability for responding (i.e. effects) are argued to be those attributed to learning, and the group with the most effective performance has learned the most.

===== Functional role of knowledge of results and potential confounding of effects =====
KR seems to have many different roles, some of which can be viewed as temporary or transient (i.e. performance effects). Three of these roles include: 1) motivation, 2) associative function, and 3) guidance. The motivational influence can increase the effort and interest of the performer in the task as well as maintain this interest once KR is removed. Though important to create interest in the task for performance and learning purposes, however the extent to which it affects learning is unknown. The associative function of KR is likely to be involved in the formation of associations between stimulus and response (i.e., Law of Effect). However, this additional effect is not able to account for findings in transfer tasks manipulating the relative frequency of KR; specifically, decreasing relative frequency results in enhanced learning. For an alternate discussion on how KR may calibrate the motor system to the outside world (see schema theory in motor program). The guidance role of KR is likely the most influential to learning as both internal and external sources of feedback play a guiding role in performance of a motor task. As the performer is informed of errors in task performance, the discrepancy can be used to continually improve performance in following trials. However, the guidance hypothesis postulates that provision of too much external, augmented feedback (e.g., KR) during practice may cause the learner to develop a harmful dependency on this source of feedback. This may lead to superior performance during practice but poor performance at transfer – an indication of poor motor learning. Additionally, it implies that, as the performer improves, the conditions of KR must be adapted according to the performer's skill and difficulty of the task in order to maximize learning (see challenge point framework).

=== Specificity of learning hypothesis ===
The specificity of learning hypothesis suggests that learning is most effective when practice sessions include environment and movement conditions which closely resemble those required during performance of the task — replicating the target skill level and context for performance.^{p. 194} It suggests that the benefit of specificity in practice occurs because motor learning is combined with physical practice during the learned sport or skill.^{p. 90} Contrary to previous beliefs, skill learning is accomplished by alternating motor learning and physical performance, making the sources of feedback work together. The learning process, especially for a difficult task, results in the creation of a representation of the task where all relevant information pertaining to task performance is integrated. This representation becomes tightly coupled with increasing experience performing the task. As a result, removing or adding a significant source of information after a practice period where it was present or not, does not cause performance to deteriorate. Alternating motor learning and physical practice can ultimately lead to a great, if not better performance as opposed to just physical practice.

== Physiological approach ==
The cerebellum and basal ganglia are critical for motor learning. As a result of the universal need for properly calibrated movement, it is not surprising that the cerebellum and basal ganglia are widely conserved across vertebrates from fish to humans.

Through motor learning the human is capable of achieving very skilled behavior, and through repetitive training a degree of automaticity can be expected. And although this can be a refined process much has been learned from studies of simple behaviors. These behaviors include eyeblink conditioning, motor learning in the vestibulo-ocular reflex, and birdsong. Research on Aplysia californica, the sea slug, has yielded detailed knowledge of the cellular mechanisms of a simple form of learning.

A type of motor learning occurs during operation of a brain–computer interface. For example, Mikhail Lebedev, Miguel Nicolelis and their colleagues recently demonstrated cortical plasticity that resulted in incorporation of an external actuator controlled through a brain–machine interface into the subject's neural representation.

At a cellular level, motor learning manifests itself in the neurons of the motor cortex. Using single-cell recording techniques, Dr. Emilio Bizzi and his collaborators have shown the behavior of certain cells, known as "memory cells," can undergo lasting alteration with practice.

Motor learning is also accomplished on the musculoskeletal level. Each motor neuron in the body innervates one or more muscle cells, and together these cells form what is known as a motor unit. For a person to perform even the simplest motor task, the activity of thousands of these motor units must be coordinated. It appears that the body handles this challenge by organizing motor units into modules of units whose activity is correlated.

== Disordered motor learning ==
=== Developmental coordination disorder ===
Impairments associated with developmental coordination disorder (DCD) involve difficulty in learning new motor skills as well as limited postural control and deficits in sensorimotor coordination. It appears that children with DCD are not able to improve performance of complex motor tasks by practice alone. However, there is evidence that task-specific training can improve performance of simpler tasks. Impaired skills learning may be correlated with brain activity, particularly, a reduction of brain activity in regions associated with skilled motor practice.

=== Apraxia ===
Motor learning has been applied to stroke recovery and neurorehabilitation, as rehabilitation is generally a process of relearning lost skills through practice and/or training. Although rehabilitation clinicians utilize practice as a major component within an intervention, a gap remains between motor control and motor learning research and rehabilitation practice. Common motor learning paradigms include robot arm paradigms, where individuals are encouraged to resist against a hand held device throughout specific arm movements. Another important concept to motor learning is the amount practice implemented in an intervention. Studies regarding the relationship between the amount of training received and the retention of the memory a set amount of time afterwards have been a popular focus in research. It has been shown that over learning leads to major improvements in long term retention and little effect on performance. Motor learning practice paradigms have compared the differences of different practice schedules, and it has proposed that repetition of the same movements is not enough in order to relearn a skill, as it is unclear whether true brain recovery is elicited through repetition alone. It is suggested that compensation methods develop through pure repetition and to elicit cortical changes (true recovery), individuals should be exposed to more challenging tasks. Research that has implemented motor learning and rehabilitation practice has been used within the stroke population and includes arm ability training, constraint-induced movement therapy, electromyograph-triggered neuromuscular stimulation, interactive robot therapy and virtual reality-based rehabilitation. A recent study ischemic conditioning was delivered via blood pressure cuff inflation and deflation to the arm, to facilitate learning. It showed for the first time in humans and animals, that ischemic conditioning can enhance motor learning and that the enhancement is retained over time. The potential benefits of ischemic conditioning extend far beyond stroke to other neuro-, geriatric, and pediatric rehabilitation populations. These findings were featured on Global Medical Discovery news.

== See also ==
- Apraxia
- Bayesian inference in motor learning
- Brain–computer interface
- Cephalocaudal trend
- Cognitive science
- Motor skill
- Motor coordination
- Muscle memory
- Procedural memory
- Proximodistal trend
- Sequence learning
