= Learning theory (education) =

Theory that describes how students receive, process, and retain knowledge during learning

Learning theory attempts to describe how students receive, process, and retain knowledge during learning. Cognitive, emotional, and environmental influences, as well as prior experience, all play a part in how understanding, or a worldview, is acquired or changed and knowledge and skills retained.

Behaviorists look at learning as an aspect of conditioning, and advocate a system of rewards and targets in education. Educators who embrace cognitive theory believe that the definition of learning as a change in behaviour is too narrow, and study the learner rather than their environment—and in particular the complexities of human memory. Those who advocate constructivism believe that a learner's ability to learn relies largely on what they already know and understand, and the acquisition of knowledge should be an individually tailored process of construction. Transformative learning theory focuses on the often-necessary change required in a learner's preconceptions and worldview. Geographical learning theory focuses on the ways that contexts and environments shape the learning process.

Outside the realm of educational psychology, techniques to directly observe the functioning of the brain during the learning process, such as event-related potential and functional magnetic resonance imaging, are used in educational neuroscience. The theory of multiple intelligences, where learning is seen as the interaction between dozens of different functional areas in the brain each with their own individual strengths and weaknesses in any particular human learner, has also been proposed, but empirical research has found the theory to be unsupported by evidence.

== Philosophy of education ==
=== Classical philosophers ===
==== Plato ====
Plato (428 BC–347 BC) proposed the question: "How does an individual learn something new when the topic is brand new to that person?", This question may seem trivial; however, think of a human like a computer. The question would then become: How does a computer take in any factual information without previous programming? Plato answered his own question by stating that knowledge is present at birth and all information learned by a person is merely a recollection of something the soul has already learned previously, which is called the Theory of Recollection or Platonic epistemology. This answer could be further justified by a paradox: If a person knows something, they don't need to question it, and if a person does not know something, they don't know to question it. Plato says that if one did not previously know something, then they cannot learn it. He describes learning as a passive process, where information and knowledge are ironed into the soul over time. However, Plato's theory elicits even more questions about knowledge: If we can only learn something when we already had the knowledge impressed onto our souls, then how did our souls gain that knowledge in the first place? Plato's theory can seem convoluted; however, his classical theory can still help us understand knowledge today.

==== Locke ====
John Locke (1632–1704) offered an answer to Plato's question as well. Locke offered the "blank slate" theory where humans are born into the world with no innate knowledge and are ready to be written on and influenced by the environment. He maintained that knowledge and ideas originate from two sources, which are sensation and reflection. The former provides insights regarding external objects (including their properties) while the latter provides the ideas about one's mental faculties (volition and understanding). In the theory of empiricism, these sources are direct experience and observation. Locke, like David Hume, is considered an empiricist because he locates the source of human knowledge in the empirical world.

Locke recognized that something had to be present, however. This something, to Locke, seemed to be "mental powers". Locke viewed these powers as a biological ability the baby is born with, similar to how a baby knows how to biologically function when born. So as soon as the baby enters the world, it immediately has experiences with its surroundings and all of those experiences are being transcribed to the baby's "slate". All of the experiences then eventually culminate into complex and abstract ideas. This theory can still help teachers understand their students' learning today.

== Educational psychology ==
=== Behaviorism ===
The term "behaviorism" was coined in 1913 by American psychologist John Watson to describe an approach to psychology which aimed to scientifically study behavior rather than introspection, since behavior could be measured. In an article in the Psychological Review, he stated that, "Its theoretical goal is the prediction and control of behavior. Introspection forms no essential part of its methods, nor is the scientific value of its data dependent upon the readiness with which they lend themselves to interpretation in terms of consciousness."

Methodological behaviorism is based on the theory of only explaining public events, or observable behavior. B.F. Skinner introduced another type of behaviorism called radical behaviorism, or the conceptual analysis of behavior, which is based on the theory of also explaining private events; particularly, thinking and feelings. Radical behaviorism forms the conceptual piece of behavior analysis.

In behavior analysis, learning is the acquisition of a new behavior through conditioning and social learning.

==== Learning and conditioning ====
The three main types of conditioning and learning:

- Classical conditioning, where the behavior becomes a reflex response to an antecedent stimulus.
- Operant conditioning, in which the consequences of a behavior influence its future likelihood; reinforcement increases that likelihood, whereas punishment decreases it.
- Social learning theory, where an observation of behavior is followed by modeling.

Ivan Pavlov discovered classical conditioning. He observed that if dogs come to associate the delivery of food with a white lab coat or the ringing of a bell, they produce saliva, even when there is no sight or smell of food. Classical conditioning considers this form of learning the same, whether in dogs or in humans. Operant conditioning reinforces this behavior with a reward or a punishment. A reward increases the likelihood of the behavior recurring, a punishment decreases its likelihood. Social learning theory observes behavior and is followed with modeling.

These three learning theories form the basis of applied behavior analysis, the application of behavior analysis, which uses analyzed antecedents, functional analysis, replacement behavior strategies, and often data collection and reinforcement to change behavior. The old practice was called behavior modification, which only used assumed antecedents and consequences to change behavior without acknowledging the conceptual analysis; analyzing the function of behavior and teaching of new behaviors that would serve the same function was never relevant in behavior modification.

Behaviorists view the learning process as a change in behavior, and arrange the environment to elicit desired responses through such devices as behavioral objectives, Competency-based learning, and skill development and training. Educational approaches such as Early Intensive Behavioral Intervention, curriculum-based measurement, and direct instruction have emerged from this model.

==== Transfer of learning ====
Transfer of learning is the idea that what one learns in school somehow carries over to situations different from that particular time and that particular setting. Transfer was amongst the first phenomena tested in educational psychology. Edward Lee Thorndike was a pioneer in transfer research. He found that though transfer is extremely important for learning, it is a rarely occurring phenomenon. In fact, he held an experiment where he had the subjects estimate the size of a specific shape and then he would switch the shape. He found that the prior information did not help the subjects; instead it impeded their learning.

One explanation of why transfer does not occur often involves surface structure and deep structure. The surface structure is the way a problem is framed. The deep structure is the steps for the solution. For example, when a math story problem changes contexts from asking how much it costs to reseed a lawn to how much it costs to varnish a table, they have different surface structures, but the steps for getting the answers are the same. However, many people are more influenced by the surface structure. In reality, the surface structure is unimportant. Nonetheless, people are concerned with it because they believe that it provides background knowledge on how to do the problem. Consequently, this interferes with their understanding of the deep structure of the problem. Even if somebody tries to concentrate on the deep structure, transfer still may be unsuccessful because the deep structure is not usually obvious. Therefore, surface structure gets in the way of people's ability to see the deep structure of the problem and transfer the knowledge they have learned to come up with a solution to a new problem.

Current learning pedagogies focus on conveying rote knowledge, independent of the context that gives it meaning. Because of this, students often struggle to transfer this stand-alone information into other aspects of their education. Students need much more than abstract concepts and self-contained knowledge; they need to be exposed to learning that is practiced in the context of authentic activity and culture. Critics of situated cognition, however, would argue that by discrediting stand-alone information, the transfer of knowledge across contextual boundaries becomes impossible. There must be a balance between situating knowledge while also grasping the deep structure of material, or the understanding of how one arrives to know such information.

Some theorists argue that transfer does not even occur at all. They believe that students transform what they have learned into the new context. They say that transfer is too much of a passive notion. They believe students, instead, transform their knowledge in an active way. Students don't simply carry over knowledge from the classroom, but they construct the knowledge in a way that they can understand it themselves. The learner changes the information they have learned to make it best adapt to the changing contexts that they use the knowledge in. This transformation process can occur when a learner feels motivated to use the knowledge—however, if the student does not find the transformation necessary, it is less likely that the knowledge will ever transform.

==== Techniques and benefits of transfer of learning ====
There are many different conditions that influence transfer of learning in the classroom. These conditions include features of the task, features of the learner, features of the organization and social context of the activity. The features of the task include practicing through simulations, problem-based learning, and knowledge and skills for implementing new plans. The features of learners include their ability to reflect on past experiences, their ability to participate in group discussions, practice skills, and participate in written discussions. All the unique features contribute to a student's ability to use transfer of learning. There are structural techniques that can aid learning transfer in the classroom. These structural strategies include hugging and bridging.

Hugging uses the technique of simulating an activity to encourage reflexive learning. An example of the hugging strategy is when a student practices teaching a lesson or when a student role plays with another student. These examples encourage critical thinking that engages the student and helps them understand what they are learning—one of the goals of transfer of learning and desirable difficulties.

Bridging is when instruction encourages thinking abstractly by helping to identify connections between ideas and to analyze those connections. An example is when a teacher lets the student analyze their past test results and the way they got those results. This includes amount of study time and study strategies. Looking at their past study strategies can help them come up with strategies to improve performance. These are some of the ideas important to successful to hugging and bridging practices.

There are many benefits of transfer of learning in the classroom. One of the main benefits is the ability to quickly learn a new task. This has many real-life applications such as language and speech processing. Transfer of learning is also very useful in teaching students to use higher cognitive thinking by applying their background knowledge to new situations.

=== Cognitivism ===
==== Gestalt theory ====
Cognitive theories grew out of Gestalt psychology. Gestalt psychology was developed in Germany in the early 1900s by Wolfgang Kohler and was brought to America in the 1920s. The German word Gestalt is roughly equivalent to the English "emergence (of a form-as in the game pictionary, when all of a sudden one recognises what the person is trying to convey - the form and meaning "emerge")", configuration or organization and emphasizes the whole of human experience. Over the years, the Gestalt psychologists provided demonstrations and described principles to explain the way we organize our sensations into perceptions. Max Wertheimer, one of the founding fathers of Gestalt Theory, observed that sometimes we interpret motion when there is no motion at all. For example: a powered sign used at a convenience store to indicate that the store is open or closed might be seen as a sign with "constant light". However, the lights are actually flashing. Each light has been programmed to blink rapidly at their own individual pace. Perceived as a whole however, the sign appears fully lit without flashes. If perceived individually, the lights turn off and on at designated times. Another example of this would be a brick house: As a whole, it is viewed as a standing structure. However, it is actually composed of many smaller parts, which are individual bricks. People tend to see things from a holistic point of view rather than breaking it down into sub units.

In Gestalt theory, psychologists say that instead of obtaining knowledge from what's in front of us, we often learn by making sense of the relationship between what's new and old. Because we have a unique perspective of the world, humans have the ability to generate their own learning experiences and interpret information that may or may not be the same for someone else.

Gestalt psychologists criticize behaviorists for being too dependent on overt behavior to explain learning. They propose looking at the patterns rather than isolated events. Gestalt views of learning have been incorporated into what have come to be labeled cognitive theories. Two key assumptions underlie this cognitive approach: that the memory system is an active organized processor of information and that prior knowledge plays an important role in learning. Gestalt theorists believe that for learning to occur, prior knowledge must exist on the topic. When the learner applies their prior knowledge to the advanced topic, the learner can understand the meaning in the advanced topic, and learning can occur. Cognitive theories look beyond behavior to consider how human memory works to promote learning, and an understanding of short-term memory and long-term memory is important to educators influenced by cognitive theory. They view learning as an internal mental process (including insight, information processing, memory and perception) where the educator focuses on building intelligence and cognitive development. The individual learner is more important than the environment.

==== Other cognitive theories ====
Once memory theories like the Atkinson–Shiffrin memory model and Baddeley's working memory model were established as a theoretical framework in cognitive psychology, new cognitive frameworks of learning began to emerge during the 1970s, 80s, and 90s. Today, researchers are concentrating on topics like cognitive load and information processing theory. These theories of learning play a role in influencing instructional design. Cognitive theory is used to explain such topics as social role acquisition, intelligence and memory as related to age.

In the late twentieth century, situated cognition emerged as a theory that recognized current learning as primarily the transfer of decontextualized and formal knowledge. Bredo (1994) depicts situated cognition as "shifting the focus from individual in environment to individual and environment". In other words, individual cognition should be considered as intimately related with the context of social interactions and culturally constructed meaning. Learning through this perspective, in which knowing and doing become inseparable, becomes both applicable and whole.

Much of the education students receive is limited to the culture of schools, without consideration for authentic cultures outside of education. Curricula framed by situated cognition can bring knowledge to life by embedding the learned material within the culture students are familiar with. For example, formal and abstract syntax of math problems can be transformed by placing a traditional math problem within a practical story problem. This presents an opportunity to meet that appropriate balance between situated and transferable knowledge. Lampert (1987) successfully did this by having students explore mathematical concepts that are continuous with their background knowledge. She does so by using money, which all students are familiar with, and then develops the lesson to include more complex stories that allow for students to see various solutions as well as create their own. In this way, knowledge becomes active, evolving as students participate and negotiate their way through new situations.

=== Constructivism ===
Founded by Jean Piaget, constructivism emphasizes the importance of the active involvement of learners in constructing knowledge for themselves. Students are thought to use background knowledge and concepts to assist them in their acquisition of novel information. On approaching such new information, the learner faces a loss of equilibrium with their previous understanding, and this demands a change in cognitive structure. This change effectively combines previous and novel information to form an improved cognitive schema. Constructivism can be both subjectively and contextually based. Under the theory of radical constructivism, coined by Ernst von Glasersfeld, understanding relies on one's subjective interpretation of experience as opposed to objective "reality". Similarly, William Cobern's idea of contextual constructivism encompasses the effects of culture and society on experience.

Constructivism asks why students do not learn deeply by listening to a teacher, or reading from a textbook. To design effective teaching environments, it believes one needs a good understanding of what children already know when they come into the classroom. The curriculum should be designed in a way that builds on the pupil's background knowledge and is allowed to develop with them. Begin with complex problems and teach basic skills while solving these problems. The learning theories of John Dewey, Maria Montessori, and David A. Kolb serve as the foundation of the application of constructivist learning theory in the classroom. Constructivism has many varieties such as active learning, discovery learning, and knowledge building, but all versions promote a student's free exploration within a given framework or structure. The teacher acts as a facilitator who encourages students to discover principles for themselves and to construct knowledge by working answering open-ended questions and solving real-world problems. To do this, a teacher should encourage curiosity and discussion among his/her students as well as promoting their autonomy. In scientific areas in the classroom, constructivist teachers provide raw data and physical materials for the students to work with and analyze.

=== Transformative learning theory ===
Transformative learning theory seeks to explain how humans revise and reinterpret meaning. Transformative learning is the cognitive process of effecting change in a frame of reference. A frame of reference defines our view of the world. The emotions are often involved. Adults have a tendency to reject any ideas that do not correspond to their particular values, associations and concepts.

Our frames of reference are composed of two dimensions: habits of mind and points of view. Habits of mind, such as ethnocentrism, are harder to change than points of view. Habits of mind influence our point of view and the resulting thoughts or feelings associated with them, but points of view may change over time as a result of influences such as reflection, appropriation and feedback. Transformative learning takes place by discussing with others the "reasons presented in support of competing interpretations, by critically examining evidence, arguments, and alternative points of view". When circumstances permit, transformative learners move toward a frame of reference that is more inclusive, discriminating, self-reflective, and integrative of experience.

== Educational neuroscience ==
American Universities such as Harvard, Johns Hopkins, and University of Southern California began offering majors and degrees dedicated to educational neuroscience or neuroeducation in the first decade of the twenty-first century. Such studies seek to link an understanding of brain processes with classroom instruction and experiences. Neuroeducation analyzes biological changes in the brain from processing new information. It looks at what environmental, emotional, and social situations best help the brain store and retain new information via the linking of neurons—and best keep the dendrites from being reabsorbed, losing the information. The 1990s were designated "The Decade of the Brain", and advances took place in neuroscience at an especially rapid pace. The three dominant methods for measuring brain activities are event-related potential, functional magnetic resonance imaging and magnetoencephalography (MEG).

The integration and application to education of what we know about the brain was strengthened in the 2000s when the American Federation of Teachers stated: "It is vital that we identify what science tells us about how people learn in order to improve the education curriculum." This new field in education in modern brain imaging techniques now make it possible, in some sense, to watch the brain as it learns, and the question then arises: can the results of neuro-scientific studies of brains as they are learning usefully inform practice in this area? Researchers expect that new technologies and ways of observing will produce new scientific evidence that helps refine the paradigms of what students need and how they learn best.

=== Formal and mental discipline ===
All individuals have the ability to develop mental discipline and the skill of mindfulness, the two go hand in hand. Mental discipline is huge in shaping what people do, say, think and feel. It's critical in terms of the processing of information and involves the ability to recognize and respond appropriately to new things and information people come across, or have recently been taught. Mindfulness is important to the process of learning in many aspects. Being mindful means to be present with and engaged in whatever you are doing at a specific moment in time. Being mindful can aid in helping us to more critically think, feel and understand the new information we are in the process of absorbing. The formal discipline approach seeks to develop causation between the advancement of the mind by exercising it through exposure to abstract school subjects such as science, language and mathematics. With student's repetitive exposure to these particular subjects, some scholars feel that the acquisition of knowledge pertaining to science, language and math is of "secondary importance", and believe that the strengthening and further development of the mind that this curriculum provides holds far greater significance to the progressing learner in the long haul. D.C. Phillips and Jonas F. Soltis provide some skepticism to this notion. Their skepticism stems largely in part from feeling that the relationship between formal discipline and the overall advancement of the mind is not as strong as some would say. They illustrate their skepticism by opining that it is foolish to blindly assume that people are better off in life, or at performing certain tasks, because of taking particular, yet unrelated courses.

== Multiple intelligences ==
The existence of multiple intelligences is proposed by psychologist Howard Gardner, who suggests that different kinds of intelligence exists in human beings. It is a theory that has been fashionable in continuous professional development (CPD) training courses for teachers. However, the theory of multiple intelligences is often cited as an example of pseudoscience because it lacks empirical evidence or falsifiability.

== Multimedia learning ==
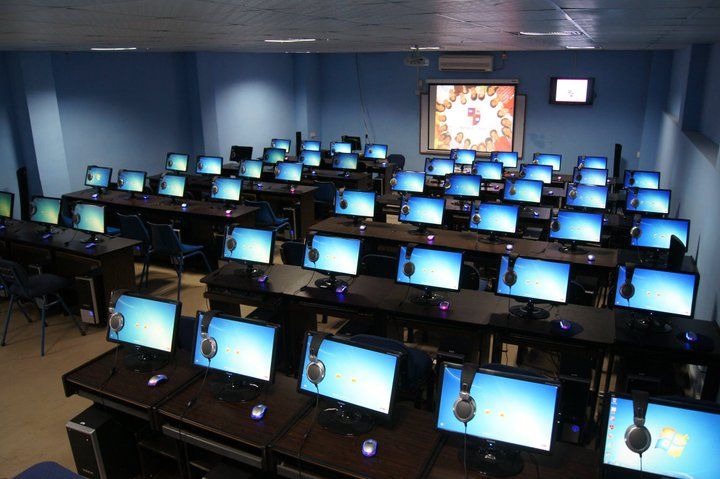
A multimedia classroom at Islington College, in the United Kingdom

Multimedia learning refers to the use of visual and auditory teaching materials that may include video, computer and other information technology. Multimedia learning theory focuses on the principles that determine the effective use of multimedia in learning, with emphasis on using both the visual and auditory channels for information processing.

The auditory channel deals with information that is heard, and the visual channel processes information that is seen. The visual channel holds less information than the auditory channel. If both the visual and auditory channels are presented with information, more knowledge is retained. However, if too much information is delivered it is inadequately processed, and long-term memory is not acquired. Multimedia learning seeks to give instructors the ability to stimulate both the visual and auditory channels of the learner, resulting in better progress.

=== Using online games for learning ===
Many educators and researchers believe that information technology could bring innovation on traditional educational instructions. Teachers and technologists are searching for new and innovative ways to design learner-centered learning environments effectively, trying to engage learners more in the learning process. Claims have been made that online games have the potential to teach, train and educate and they are effective means for learning skills and attitudes that are not so easy to learn by rote memorization.

There has been a lot of research done in identifying the learning effectiveness in game based learning. Learner characteristics and cognitive learning outcomes have been identified as the key factors in research on the implementation of games in educational settings. In the process of learning a language through an online game, there is a strong relationship between the learner's prior knowledge of that language and their cognitive learning outcomes. For the people with prior knowledge of the language, the learning effectiveness of the games is much more than those with none or less knowledge of the language.

== Other learning theories ==
Other learning theories have also been developed for more specific purposes. For example, andragogy is the art and science to help adults learn. Connectivism is a recent theory of networked learning, which focuses on learning as making connections. The Learning as a Network (LaaN) theory builds upon connectivism, complexity theory, and double-loop learning. It starts from the learner and views learning as the continuous creation of a personal knowledge network (PKN).

=== Learning style theories ===
Learning style theories propose that individuals learn in different ways, that there are distinct learning styles and that knowledge of a learner's preferred learning style leads to faster and more satisfactory improvement. However, the current research has not been able to find solid scientific evidence to support the main premises of learning styles theory.

=== Affective Context Model ===
The affective context model, proposed by Nick Shackleton-Jones, states that people store experiences based on how those experiences made them feel. According to the model, these emotional responses are later used to reconstruct memories when they are needed.

=== Informal and post-modern theories ===
In theories that make use of cognitive restructuring, an informal curriculum promotes the use of prior knowledge to help students gain a broad understanding of concepts. New knowledge cannot be told to students, it believes, but rather the students' current knowledge must be challenged. In this way, students adjust their ideas to more closely resemble actual theories or concepts. By using this method students gain the broad understanding they're taught and later are more willing to learn and keep the specifics of the concept or theory. This theory further aligns with the idea that teaching the concepts and the language of a subject should be split into multiple steps.

Other informal learning theories look at the sources of motivation for learning. Intrinsic motivation may create a more self-regulated learner, yet schools undermine intrinsic motivation. Critics argue that the average student learning in isolation performs significantly less well than those learning with collaboration and mediation. Students learn through talk, discussion, and argumentation.

== Educational anthropology ==
=== Philosophical anthropology ===
According to Theodora Polito, "every well-constructed theory of education [has] at [its] center a philosophical anthropology," which is "a philosophical reflection on some basic problems of mankind." Philosophical anthropology is an exploration of human nature and humanity. Aristotle, an early influence on the field, deemed human nature to be "rational animality," wherein humans are closely related to other animals but still set apart by their ability to form rational thought. Philosophical anthropology expanded upon these ideas by clarifying that rationality is, "determined by the biological and social conditions in which the lives of human beings are embedded." Fully developed learning theories address some of the "basic problems of mankind" by examining these biological and social conditions to understand and manipulate the rationality of humanity in the context of learning.

Philosophical anthropology is evident in behaviorism, which requires an understanding of humanity and human nature in order to assert that the similarities between humans and other animals are critical and influential to the process of learning. Situated cognition focuses on how humans interact with each other and their environments, which would be considered the "social conditions" explored within the field of philosophical anthropology. Transformative learning theories operate with the assumption that humans are rational creatures capable of examining and redefining perspectives, something that is heavily considered within philosophical anthropology.

An awareness and understanding of philosophical anthropology contributes to a greater comprehension and practice of any learning theory. In some cases, philosophy can be used to further explore and define uncertain terms within the field of education. Philosophy can also be a vehicle to explore the purpose of education, which can greatly influence an educational theory.

== Criticism ==
Critics of learning theories that seek to displace traditional educational practices claim that there is no need for such theories; that the attempt to comprehend the process of learning through the construction of theories creates problems and inhibits personal freedom.

== See also ==
- Andragogical learning theory
- Cognitivism (learning theory)
- Connectivism (learning theory)
- Constructivism (learning theory)
- Cultural-historical psychology
- Evidence-based education
- Instructional theory
- Instructional design
- Kinesthetic learning
- Learning by teaching
- Learning environment
- Learning space
- Psychology of learning
- Science, technology, society and environment education

About accelerating the learning process

- Cognitive acceleration
- Spaced repetition
- Incremental reading
- Forward testing effect

About the mechanisms of memory and learning

- Neural networks in the brain
- Sleep and learning
- Latent learning
- Memory consolidation
- Short-term memory versus working memory
- Long-term memory
- Desirable difficulties
- Declarative memory versus procedural memory
- The cerebellum and motor learning

About learning theories related to classroom learning

- Contemporary Educational Psychology/Chapter 2: The Learning Process
