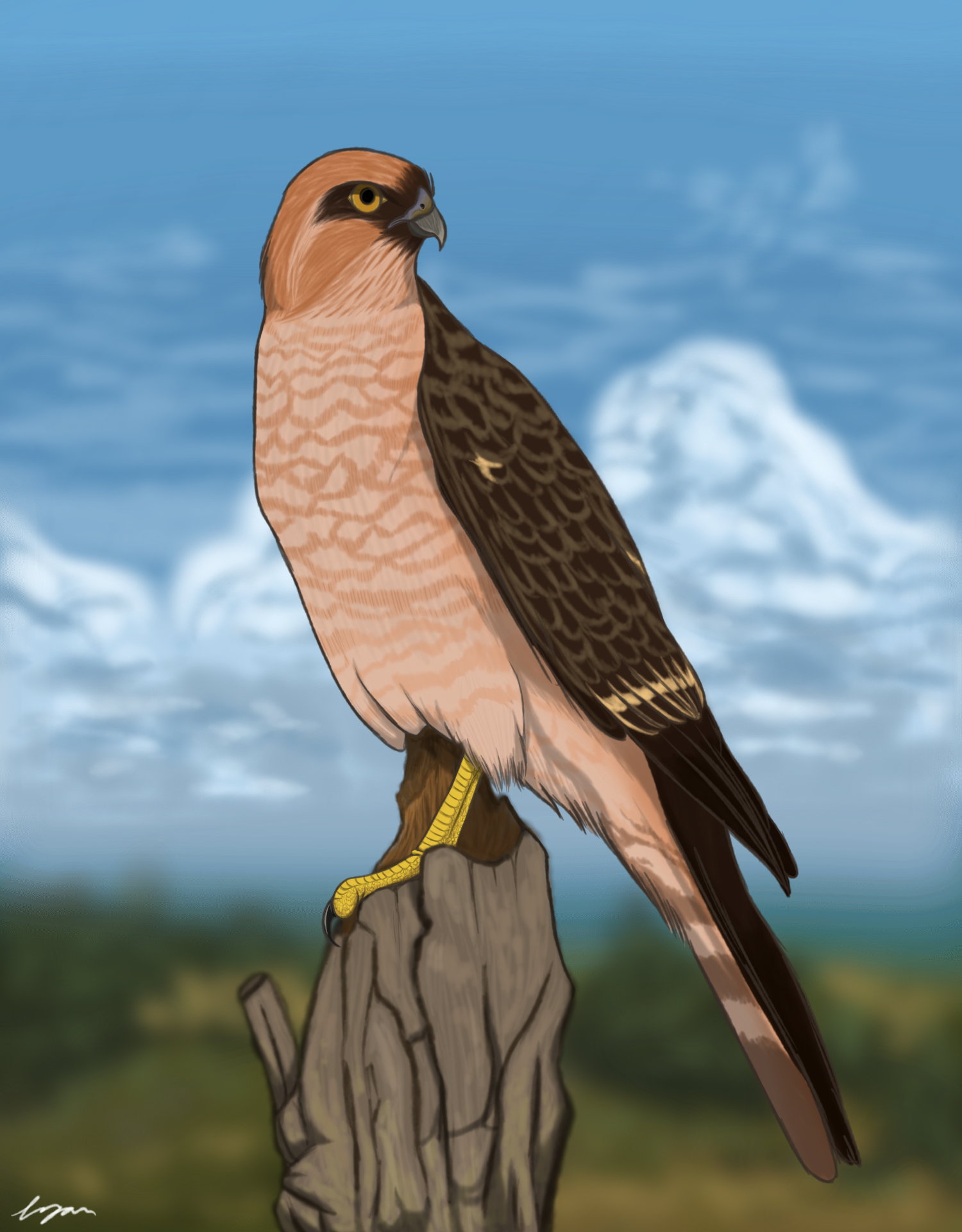
- An illustrated reconstruction of the Bermuda hawk.

Conservation status
- Extinct (1603) (IUCN 3.1)

Scientific classification
- Kingdom: Animalia
- Phylum: Chordata
- Class: Aves
- Order: Accipitriformes
- Family: Accipitridae
- Subfamily: Buteoninae
- Genus: †Bermuteo; Olson, 2008
- Species: †B. avivorus

Binomial name
- †Bermuteo avivorus Olson, 2008

= Bermuda hawk =

Extinct species of bird

The Bermuda hawk (Bermuteo avivorus) is an extinct bird of prey that was endemic to Bermuda. It was the sole member of the genus Bermuteo.

== Taxonomy and naming ==
The species was described in 2008 by American biologist and ornithologist Storrs Lovejoy Olson (1944-2021), who appointed it under the scientific name, Bermuteo avivorus. Bermuteo here is an amalgam of Bermuda and Buteo, an Accipitrid genus which includes various hawk and buzzard species. The species name, avivorus, refers to bird-catching behaviour.

== Distribution ==
The Bermuda hawk inhabited the island of Bermuda where the subfossil remains of the species were discovered in quaternary deposits. While the subfossil remains are present in multiple deposits on Bermuda, they are scarcely uncovered. During Olson's initial description of the species in 2008, he notes that even after "25 years of collecting" the bird's remains were "frustratingly few". Olson's sample consisted of seven bones recovered from four or five localities on Bermuda, of which only three were complete (femur, humerus, and tibiotarsi), representing a maximum of just six individuals.

Prior to human settlement and encroachment, Bermuda was rich in native evergreen forests of Bermuda cedar (Juniperus bermudiana) and palmetto (Sabal bermudana) which may have served as habitat for the species. Information pertaining to the preferred habitat of the bermuda hawk as well as its ecology were never recorded in historic accounts, and as a result, little can be inferred.

== Description ==
Few historic descriptions of the Bermuda hawk exist and as such, its physical appearance is unknown. It was inferred by Olson that the species may have exhibited prominent sexual dimorphism, where the females where potentially twice the mass of the males. This is a characteristic feature amongst bird-hunting hawks and gives reason for the fluctuating sizes of the femurs collected as samples. Due to the large endemic bird population of Bermuda (a population that would have been far more biodiverse before human settlement), the hawk likely had little else to feed on than other birds, further reinforcing the hypothesis that the species was a highly sexually dimorphic bird-hunter.

=== Generic description and morphological differences from extant hawk species ===
The generic description given by Olson regarding the holotype of the Bermuda hawk explains that the femur of the species is unlike that of any other hawk genus, owing its morphological distinction to its structure. Unlike other hawk genera, the femur of the Bermuda hawk has a much smaller head that is not as round, exhibiting a flattened, proximodistal shape with the distal margin of the femur's head being near continuous with the posterior crest of the neck. He notes also that the "distinct wing-like condyle of the femur in most Accipitridae is reduced in Bermuteo".

The anatomy of the femur appears most similar to the red-tailed hawk (Buteo jamaicensis) or rough-legged buzzard (Buteo lagopus) the latter being a common winter vagrant, while the former has in modern times become an infrequent breeder on Bermuda, which it likely avoided doing before the introduction of rats in the 17th century. The holotypical femur is most contiguous with that of a small male roadside hawk (Rupornis magnirostris), being just 244-268g (8.6-9oz), while the sample humerus is most comparable to a large female broad-winged hawk (Buteo platypterus) at a maximum mass of 495g (17oz).

== Extinction and historic accounts ==
The exact date of the extinction of the Bermuda hawk is unknown but the International Union for the Conservation of Nature (IUCN) lists a rough date as 1603, given reason by sightings recorded that year by explorers. Its extinction likely followed hunting and the introduction of invasive species to Bermuda in the 17th century, most notably the introduction of feral pigs which have been present on the island as early as 1625. Large-scale burnings and deforestation of Bermuda's evergreen forests following European settlement also contributed to the rapid alteration of the landscape, and may have contributed to the extinction of the Bermuda hawk. It can also be inferred using historical accounts that Bermuda hawks may have been hunted for food.

historical accounts of the species are scarce, though some do exist. A 1603 account by a Diego Ramírez mentions the hawk species and its possible island tameness, stating: "There are many very large dark herons, many very handsome sparrow-hawks, so stupid that we even clubbed them". This account further legitimises the Bermuda hawk as an endemic species, as any migrant raptors would be far more weary of humans. in 1610, William Starchy wrote that "Hawkes of which in March wee found diuers [diverse] Ayres, Goshawkes and Tassels" with "Ayres" here likely meaning "eyries", a word for a large bird's nest usually belonging to a raptor, while "Tassels" refers to a male falcon or hawk; a tiercel. It is highly likely that the species had gone extinct between the settlement of Bermuda in 1612 and 1623, as English explorer and colonial governor Captain John Smith (1579-1631) reported a lack of endemic hawks that year, recounting that: "Sometimes are also seene Falcons and Jar-falcon, Ospraies, a bird like a Hobby, but because they come seldome, they are held but as passengers". The term "passenger" used here likely refers to the migratory nature of the raptors he did see.
