= Motor program =

Abstract representation of movement

A motor program is an abstract metaphor of the central organization of movement and control of the many degrees of freedom involved in performing an action. Biologically realistic alternatives to the metaphor of the "motor program" are represented by central pattern generators.^{p. 182} Signals transmitted through efferent and afferent pathways allow the central nervous system to anticipate, plan or guide movement. Evidence for the concept of motor programs includes the following:^{p. 182}

1. Processing of afferent information (feedback) is too slow for on-going regulation of rapid movements.
2. Reaction time (time between “go” signal and movement initiation) increases with movement complexity, suggesting that movements are planned in advance.
  Reaction Time
3. Movement is possible even without feedback from the moving limb. Moreover, velocity and acceleration of feedforward movements such as reaching are highly proportional to the distance of the target.
4. The existence of motor equivalence, i.e., the ability to perform the same action in multiple ways for instance using different muscles or the same muscles under different conditions. This suggests that a general code specifying the final output exists which is translated into specific muscle action sequences
5. Brain activation precedes that of movement. For example, the supplementary motor area becomes active one second before voluntary movement.

This is not meant to underestimate the importance of feedback information, merely that another level of control beyond feedback is used:

1. Before the movement as information about initial position, or perhaps to tune the spinal apparatus.
2. During the movement, when it is either “monitored” for the presence of error or used directly in the modulation of movements reflexively.
3. After the movement to determine the success of the response and contribute to motor learning.

== Central organization ==
=== Open and closed-loop theories ===
==== Response-chaining hypothesis ====
The response-chaining, or reflex-chaining hypothesis, proposed by William James (1890), was one of the earliest descriptions of movement control. This open-loop hypothesis postulated that movements required attention only for initiation of the first action.^{p. 165} As such, each subsequent movement was thought to be automatically triggered by response-produced afferent information from the muscles. Although feedback is involved in this process, ongoing movements cannot be modified if there are unexpected changes in the environment; feedback is not compared to some internally generated reference value for error checking. However, research involving deafferented animals and humans suggests feedback is not necessary for movement, thus the response-chaining hypothesis provides an incomplete account of movement control.

==== Adams' closed-loop theory ====
In contrast to the open-loop response-chaining hypothesis, Adams' closed-loop theory suggested that processing of afferent information was central in human motor control. Adams' closed-loop theory is based on basic motor learning research that focused on slow, graded, linear positioning tasks, which involved error detection and correction to meet goal demands. To learn a movement, a "motor program" consisting of two states of memory (i.e. memory trace and perceptual trace), is required. The memory trace (equivalent to recall memory in verbal learning) initiates the motor movement, chooses its initial direction and determines the earliest portions of the movement. Strengthening of the memory trace results from practice and feedback about movement outcome (see motor learning). In addition, the perceptual trace (similar to recognition memory in verbal tasks) is involved in guidance of the limb to the correct position along a trajectory. This is accomplished by comparing incoming feedback to the perceptual trace, which is formed from the sensory consequences of the limb being at the correct/incorrect endpoint in past experience. In the event of an error, the limb is adjusted until the movement is appropriate to the goal of the action. Importantly, the more accurate the movement, the more useful the perceptual trace that is collected and retained.

Though this theory represented an important leap forward in motor learning research, one weakness in Adams' closed-loop theory was the requirement of 1-to-1 mapping between stored states (motor programs) and movements to be made. This presented an issue related to the storage capacity of the central nervous system; a vast array of movements would require equally large repository of motor programs. Additionally, this theory could not be used to explain how motor programs for novel movements were formed.

=== Schmidt’s schema theory ===
Early motor program theories did not adequately account for evidence illustrating the influence of feedback for the modification of ongoing movement while providing a suitable explanation of motor programs storage or application in novel movement. Consequently, the notion of the generalized motor program (GMP) was developed.^{p. 205} The GMP is thought to contain an abstract representation for a class of movements with invariant features pertaining to the order of events, the relative timing of events and the relative force with which events are produced. In order to determine how a particular movement should be performed, parameters such as overall movement duration, overall force of contractions and the muscles involved are specified to the GMP. This revision of the motor program concept allows many different movements to be produced with the same motor program as well as the production of novel movements by specifying new parameters.

Richard Schmidt (1975) proposed the schema theory for motor control, suggesting in opposition to closed-loop theories, that a motor program containing general rules can be applied to different environmental or situational contexts via the involvement of open-loop control process and GMPs.^{p. 32} In Schmidt's theory, the schema contains the generalized rules that generate the spatial and temporal muscle patterns to produce a specified movement.^{p. 32} Therefore, when learning novel movements an individual may generate a new GMP based on the selection of parameters (reducing the novel movement problem), or refine an existing GMP (reducing the storage problem), depending on prior experience with movement and task context.

According to Schmidt, four things are stored in memory after an individual generates a movement:

1. The initial conditions of the movement, such as the proprioceptive information of the limbs and body.
2. The response specifications for the motor programs, which are the parameters used in the generalized motor program, such as speed and force.
3. The sensory consequences of the response, which contain information about how the movement felt, looked and sounded.
4. The outcome of that movement, which contains information of the actual outcome of the movement with knowledge of results (KR).

This information is stored in components of the motor response schema, which include the recall schema and recognition schema. The recall and recognition schema are strongly associated, as they use the relationship between the initial condition and actual outcomes; however, they are not isomorphic. They differ in that recall schema is used to select a specific response with the use of response specifications, whereas the recognition schema is used to evaluate the response with the sensory consequences. Throughout a movement, the recognition schema is compared to the expected sensory information (e.g., proprioceptive and exteroceptive) from the ongoing movement to evaluate the efficiency of the response.^{p. 32} An error signal is sent upon finalizing the movement, where the schema is then modified based on the sensory feedback and knowledge of results (see motor learning).

The schema theory illustrates that motor learning consists of continuous processes that update the recall and recognition schemas with each movement that is made.^{p. 33}

=== Multiple paired forward and inverse models ===
An alternate viewpoint on the organization and control of motor programs may be considered a computational process of selecting a motor command (i.e., the input) to achieve a desired sensory feedback (i.e., the output). Selection of the motor command depends on many internal and external variables, such as the current state of the limb(s), orientation of the body and properties of the items in the environment with which the body will interact. Given the vast number of possible combinations of these variables, the motor control system must be able to provide an appropriate command for any given context. One strategy for selecting appropriate commands involves a modular approach; multiple controllers exist such that each controller is suitable for one or a small set of contexts. Based on an estimate of the current context, a controller is chosen to generate the appropriate motor command.

This modular system can be used to describe both motor control and motor learning and requires adaptable internal forward and inverse models. Forward models describe the forward or causal relationship between system inputs, predicting sensory feedback that will occur. Inverse models (controllers) generate the motor command that will cause a desired change in state, given an environmental context. During motor learning, the forward and inverse models are paired and tightly coupled by a responsibility signal within modules. Using the forward model's predictions and sensory contextual cues, responsibility signals indicate the degree to which each pair should be responsible for controlling current behavior.

== Impairment of motor programs ==
=== Cerebellar degeneration ===
Errors in reaching are commonly found in patients with cerebellar degeneration. This suggests their motor commands do not predicatively compensate for interaction torques inherent in multi-joint motion. Several lines of research have been conducted to understand this, with evidence being provided that this impairment may be due to a malfunctioning inverse model:

- the cerebellum plays a dominant role in representing the inverse model
- the cerebellum is active during learning of arm movements in force fields.

With this knowledge, an experiment conducted by Smith and Shadmehr (2005) illustrated an impaired ability for cerebellar subjects to alter motor commands to compensate for applied force fields within a trial (i.e. modify an ongoing movement) as well as to use this error to update the following trial (i.e. changes in a following trial were unrelated to prior trial error). This agreed with prior work by Mascheke et al. (2004) who illustrated those with cerebellar degeneration had difficulty adapting motor commands when limb dynamics were altered.

== See also ==
- Central pattern generator
- Challenge Point Framework
- Hearing
- Multisensory integration
- Proprioception
- Vestibular system
- Visual perception
