= Forward testing effect =

Psychological learning theory

The forward testing effect, also known as test potentiated new learning, is a psychological learning theory which suggests that testing old information can improve learning of new information. Unlike traditional learning theories in educational psychology which have established the positive effect testing has when later attempting to retrieve the same information, the forward testing effect instead suggests that the testing experience itself possesses unique benefits which enhance the learning of new information. This memory effect is also distinct from the 'practice effect' which typically refers to an observed improvement which results from repetition and restudy, as the testing itself is considered as the catalyst for improved recall. Instead, this theory suggests that testing serves not only as a tool for assessment but as a learning tool which can aid in memory recall. The forward testing effect indicates that educators should encourage students to study using testing techniques rather than restudying information repeatedly.

The forward testing effect has received significant coverage across the scientific community, especially over the last decade, due to the increasing focus on new memory techniques to guide learning strategies and improve student learning. Since this phenomenon has been established in psychological literature, the focus has shifted to attempting to provide an account for the forward testing effect, with three predominant explanations rising to the forefront of psychological debate; the context change account, elaborative retrieval account and the episodic context account for the forward testing effect.

== Empirical evidence ==
=== Word recall ===
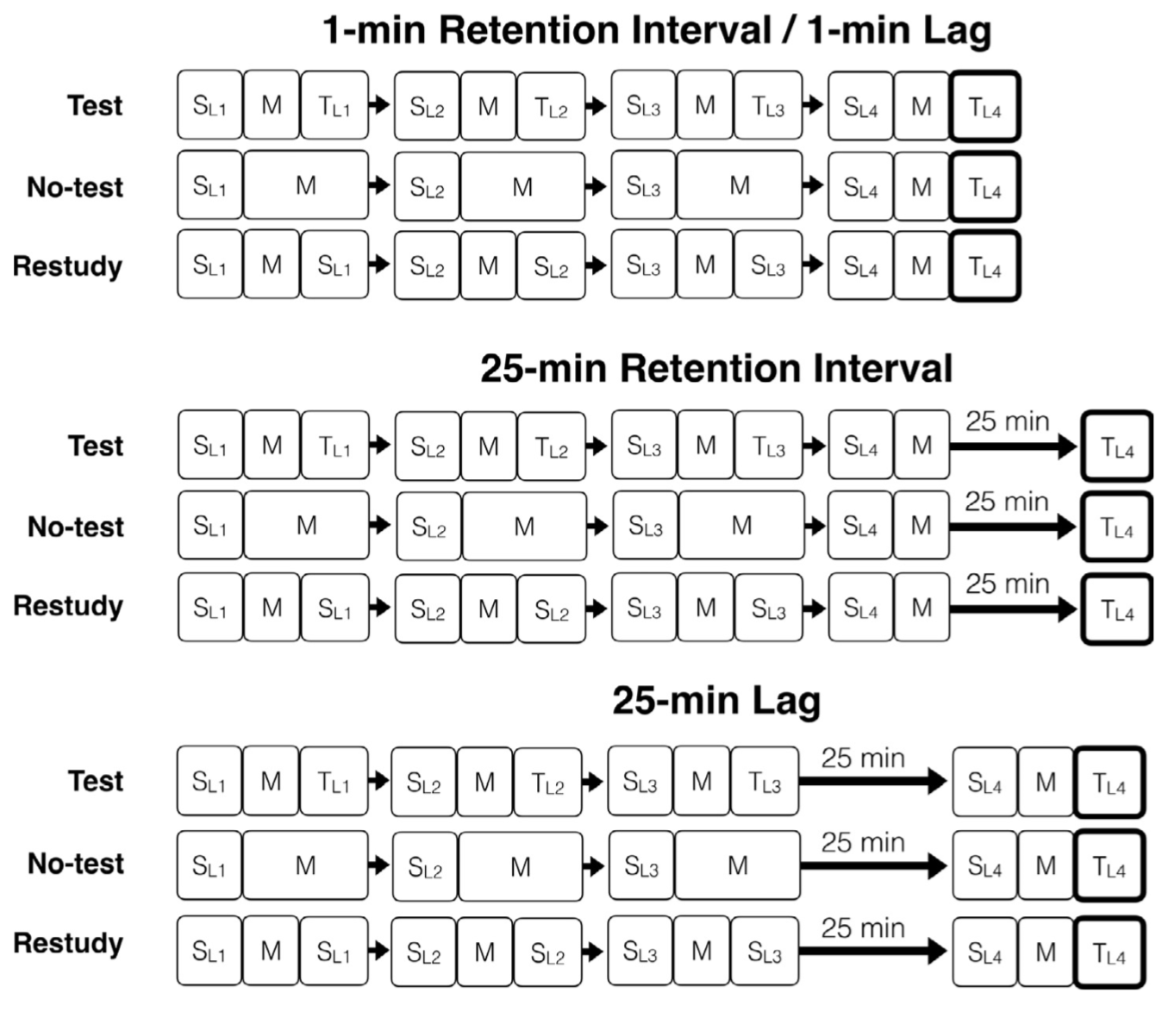
Experimental design for Chan, Manley, Davis and Szpunar's (2018) experiment.

The earliest documented study to observe the forward testing effect was conducted in 1974 by Tulving and Watkins. They observed that testing of one list of words enhanced recall of another, different list. At this point in time, the forward testing effect had not yet been theorised, hence they were quite puzzled with their discovery which sparked further research by other psychologists. Further studies involving word pairs conducted by Szpunar, McDermott and Roediger in 2008 reported similar findings that participants who were tested on one word list performed significantly better in a recall task for a completely different list, relative to those who only restudied the first list or performed a filler task. These findings were also replicated by Wahlheim who used a similar methodology in 2015, observing a strong forward testing effect.

The most recent word-based experiment which confirmed these findings was conducted by Chan, Manley, Davis and Szpunar in 2018. They specifically investigated whether the forward testing effect persisted across different time delays. In their experiment, three word lists were studied by participants. There were three groups; the participants either restudied these words, completed math problems or were tested on the words. Participants were then given a fourth word list and completed a free recall test. They found that those who had been tested on Lists 1-3 had better recall for List 4 across varying time delays. Overall these studies provided strong evidence to suggest that integrated testing of word-lists not only aided recall of the same word list but boosted later learning, hence providing evidence for the forward testing effect.

=== Visual recall ===
Several studies have been conducted on the forward testing effect for students watching video lectures. In 2013, Szpunar, Khan and Schacter, conducted a study involving video lectures. They found that students who watched lectures which included interpolated testing aided new learning, scoring higher on a final cumulative quiz. In addition, these students were observed to have reduced mind-wandering and more content-relevant thoughts throughout the lecture. Another study conducted by Jing, Szpunar and Schacter in 2016 found that participants who were tested throughout a video lecture performed far better on a cumulative test at the end of the lecture than those who weren't tested.

These experiments demonstrated the benefits of testing in a more ecologically valid setting, suggesting that university professors should consider implementing testing within their lectures through electronic testing programs such as Kahoot and Mentimeter.

== Theoretical accounts ==
There are three theoretical accounts which attempt to explain the forward testing effect; the context change account, elaborative retrieval account and, more recently, the episodic context account.

=== Context change account ===
The context change account suggests that The forward testing effect can be attributed to the change in context as the learner switches from encoding information to retrieval during testing. This account draws from the considerable evidence in favour of the existence of proactive interference as a part of interference theory, primarily from a study conducted by Jang and Huber in 2008. This study found that proactive interference occurs when the learner's ability to encode new information is inhibited by previous learning due to an extended study period. Testing of old learning provides a release from proactive interference by switching the focus of the learner's cognitive activity from memory encoding to retrieval. This release from proactive interference subsequently aids the learner who performs better in the final recall task.

However, this account has been criticised as it is considered limited in its ability to explain the forward testing effect since it implies that testing is no different from taking a study break; as long as a context change is enacted, testing has no unique benefits to learning. However, all of the aforementioned studies have demonstrated that participants who are given a 'filler task', which provides a break from encoding, do not experience the forward testing effect. This limits the validity of this account as a way to explain the forward testing effect and hence it is often disregarded.

=== Elaborative retrieval account ===
The elaborative retrieval account suggests that the encoding of semantic cues through testing is responsible for the forward testing effect. This account is the most frequently cited when referring to the forward testing effect as several studies have supported the concept of semantic cues as a tool to aid memory recall. In Chan, Manley, Davis and Szpunar study conducted in 2018, they not only found evidence for the forward testing effect across time delays but they also found strong semantic organisation among participants who experienced this effect. They subsequently concluded that these participants' enhanced performance could be attributed to their use of semantic memory cues and organisation strategies which were encoded throughout testing and retrieved when they completed the final recall task.

Further evidence for this account can be found in Wissman, Rawson and Pyc's 2011 study. In their experiment, participants attempted to learn a long expository text and recall as much of it as possible in a final recall task. When learning this text, participants either restudied the text, completed an interim test on it or participated in a filler task. These researchers not only found a forward testing effect but were able to use clustering analyses to attribute this effect to the participants' shift to more effective encoding strategies throughout interpolated tests which were later used to enhance performance in the final recall task. Therefore, they were able to infer that the use of semantic encoding strategies was the primary cause of the forward testing effect for learners.

=== Episodic context account ===
The episodic context account for the forward testing effect is one of the newest theories which attempts to explain this phenomenon. The episodic context theory consists of four main assumptions:

1. People encode contextual and temporal details when encoding information.
2. During retrieval, people reinstate, consciously or otherwise, temporal and contextual details.
3. When episodic context (temporal and contextual details) is reinstated and people update their context representations with their current contextual setting.
4. When later reinstating episodic context details again, the updated context representations aid recall of the previously learned items.

However, up until recent times, this account has not been applied to the forward testing effect. The primary study which supports this account was conducted by Whiffen and Karpicke in 2017. In their study, participants were given word lists and then either restudied them, completed math problems as a filler task or were tested on the word lists. They found that the testing condition performed best, indicating a Testing Effect but not a forward testing effect. However, interestingly, they also found that participants in the testing condition utilised temporal organisation strategies rather than semantic encoding strategies. They subsequently hypothesised that this theory could be extrapolated to the forward testing effect such that it could be theorised that participants who are tested develop context representations which aid the learning of new information. However, at this point, further research into the episodic context account is required in order to reject the popular and well-established elaborative retrieval account.

== Criticisms ==
Several criticisms have been leveled at the validity of the forward testing effect by psychologists who have conducted research and found contradictory results. One such case of this was an experiment conducted by Finn and Roediger in 2013 in which participants learned two pieces of associated information and were then given a third associated piece of information to learn. These pieces of information were the face and name of a person and then in the third phase, their profession. There were two learning conditions; one group restudied the face-name pair before learning their profession and another group was tested on them. While the forward testing effect theorises that the testing condition would perform significantly better in the free recall task for the profession (new information), this was not the case. Instead, these researchers found that testing of the face-name pair had a detrimental effect on learning the profession. In essence, testing of old information had a negative impact on learning new information, rather than the positive effect predicted by the forward testing effect.

These findings prompted another study to be conducted by Chan and Davis in 2015 which aimed to explain these findings which undermined the validity of the forward testing effect. In this study, they present the 'borrowed time hypothesis' which they attribute to the contradictory findings of Finn and Roediger. This hypothesis argues that the forward testing effect is valid but only in cases when participants don't 'borrow time', which these researchers argue occurs when new learning is intermixed with testing. In their experiment, Chan and Davis either encouraged or discouraged 'time borrowing' and found evidence for their hypothesis. This indicates that while the criticisms presented by Finn and Roediger's study are valid, the forward testing effect itself remains a valid theory but with the limitations discovered in Chan and Davis' study.
