= Memory cell =

Memory cell may refer to:

== Biology ==
- Memory cells (motor cortex), found in the primary motor cortex (M1), a region located in the posterior portion of the frontal lobe of the brain.
- Memory B cell, an antibody producing cell
- Memory T cell, an infection fighting cell
- Virtual memory T cell

== Computing ==
- Memory cell (computing), a building block of computer memory and data storage
