= Héctor Ruiz Martín =

Spanish researcher, university professor, and science communicator (born 1980)

- Born: 1980 (age 45–46); Barcelona
- Occupations: Professor, researcher, science communicator

Academic background
- Education: Biology, evolutionary genetics

Academic work
- Main interests: Educational, cognitive and learning psychology

Héctor Ruiz Martín (Barcelona, 1980) is a Spanish researcher, university professor, and science communicator, specializing in cognitive and learning psychology and its application in educational contexts. He is known for his work in evidence-based pedagogy.

== Biography ==
He holds a degree in biology and a master’s degree in evolutionary genetics from the University of Barcelona. He has worked as a secondary school and university professor.

Since 2013, he has been the director of the International Science Teaching Foundation, a non-profit organization based in London and Barcelona that promotes teaching practices grounded in scientific research.

In addition, he has served as an advisor to various governments and collaborated on educational projects to design teaching methodologies based on the science of learning.

== Books in English ==
- Learning to Learn by Knowing Your Brain: A Guide for Students, 2023.
- How Do We Learn? A Scientific Approach to Learning and Teaching (Evidence-Based Education), 2024.
