= Robert A. Bjork =

American cognitive psychologist (born 1939)

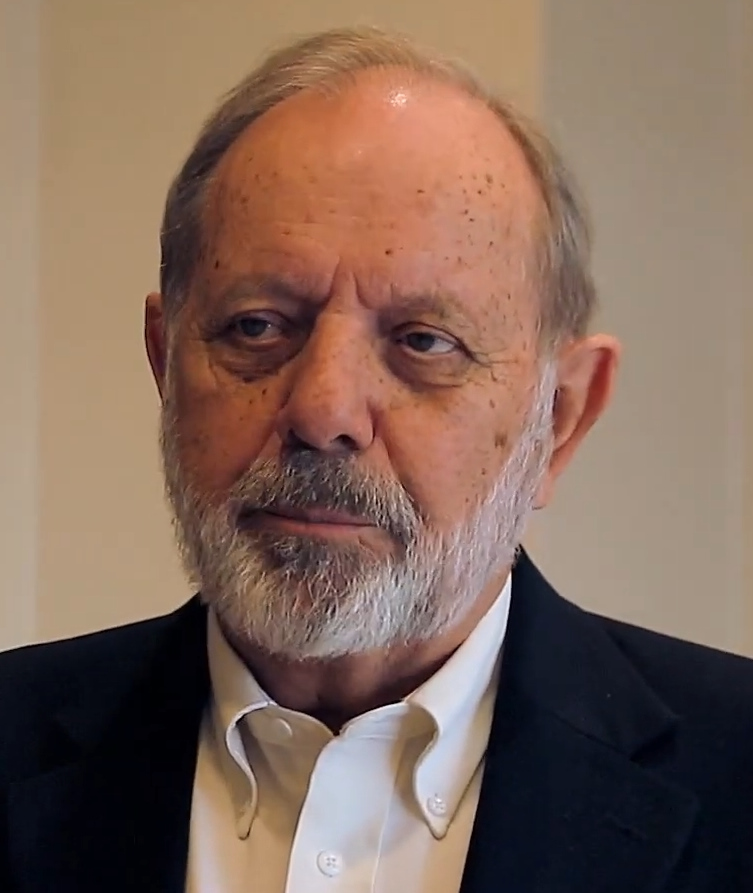
Robert Bjork in 2014

Robert Allen Bjork (born 1939) is Distinguished Professor of Psychology at the University of California, Los Angeles. His research focuses on human learning and memory and on the implications of the science of learning for instruction and training. He is the creator of the directed forgetting paradigm. He was elected a member of the National Academy of Sciences in 2022.

== Education and career ==
He got his BA degree in mathematics from the University of Minnesota in 1961, and then studied psychology under William Kaye Estes, Richard C. Atkinson, Gordon H. Bower, and James Greeno at Stanford University until he graduated from it in 1966.

He has served as editor of Memory & Cognition (1981–85); editor of Psychological Review (1995–2000); co-editor of Psychological Science in the Public Interest (1998–2004), and chair of a National Research Council Committee on Techniques for the Enhancement of Human Performance (1988–94). His positions of leadership include president of the American Psychological Society (now the Association for Psychological Science); president of the Western Psychological Association; chair of the Psychonomic Society; chair of the Society of Experimental Psychologists; and chair of the Council of Editors of the American Psychological Association (APA). He is currently chair of the Council of Graduate Departments of Psychology. He is a fellow of the Society of Experimental Psychologists, the Society for Experimental Psychology and Cognitive Science, and the James McKeen Cattell Fellow of the American Psychological Society (now the Association for Psychological Science). He is chair of the Science Advisory Board at Amplifire and has contributed explanatory video content for GoCognitive and LastingLearning.

== Cogfog ==
Bjork (with his wife, Elizabeth L. Bjork) is a founder and long-time leader of the Bjork Learning and Forgetting Lab at UCLA and the weekly cognitive psychology research group meeting associated with the lab, both informally known as Cogfog. Just as "Cogfog" has two meanings – the laboratory group and the weekly meetings – Cogfog has served dual purposes through the years. Members of the Cogfog Lab have performed seminal cognitive psychology research, and the lab has served as an important training ground for future academics and researchers.

=== Research contributions ===
The Cogfog Lab has conducted much ground-breaking research in the area of human learning and retention. In addition to the basic research, there has also been an emphasis on understanding effective ways to apply memory research findings to real-world educational contexts. Notable contributions include key studies on: desirable difficulties, spacing effect, interleaving, transfer-appropriate processing, directed forgetting, retrieval-induced forgetting, testing effect, metacognition, generation effect, sparse-distributed memory, false balance, disinformation attack, and fast mapping.

=== Alumni ===
Through the years approximately 120 students, post-docs, and visiting professors/researchers have been part of the Cogfog Lab. Participation in the lab and mentorship from the professors in the lab have helped student lab members hone their critical thinking, research methodology, data analysis, and public speaking skills. Cogfog Lab has served as a launching pad for students and post-docs who have gone on to assume faculty positions at esteemed universities worldwide. A partial list of these institutions includes: Arizona State University, Florida State University,Lafayette College, National University of Singapore, Oberlin College, UCLA, University of California, Irvine, University of Illinois at Urbana-Champaign, University of London (UK), University of Magdeburg (Germany), University of North Carolina at Chapel Hill, University of Texas at Austin, University of Virginia, Washington University in St. Louis, and Williams College.

Additionally, alumni have made significant contributions in industry research and development roles at organizations such as: Apple, Bell Labs, Columbia University Medical Center, Google, NASA, Procter & Gamble, RAND Corporation, SRI International, and United Kingdom Medical Research Council (MRC).

=== History and culture ===
CogFog originated as a modest gathering in 1979, consisting of three graduate students and two professors. Over nearly four and a half decades, it has evolved into a thriving community of professors, visiting researchers, and undergraduate and graduate students from around the world.

Much of the lab's success can be attributed to Bob and Elizabeth's vision of a lab group environment the blends "esprit de corps" and an appetite for ground-breaking research driven by critical analysis of research hypotheses, innovative study design, and astute data interpretation and visualization. The late Professor Thomas Wickens was an invaluable member of the Cogfog community during its early years and played a key role in shaping the Cogfog culture.

Cogfog is known for fostering a vibrant and inclusive community characterized by erudite discussions and conviviality. In addition to exploring scholarly topics, members often engage in lively debates over doughnuts and bagels, affectionately referred to as "CogFood", with preferences for one over the other remaining a perennial topic of contention.

=== Etymology ===
The term "Cogfog" originated from a fortuitous random pairing of "Cog" and "Fog" during a paired-associate learning experiment performed by early Bjork Lab members at UCLA. This pairing resonated with members due to its evocation of "Cognitive Fog", leading to its adoption as a colloquial term within the group, used whenever they were confused about anything. Subsequently, it became the name of the weekly research group meeting and the informal moniker of the Bjork Learning and Forgetting Lab.
