= Cephalocaudal trend =

The cephalocaudal trend, or cephalocaudal gradient of growth, refers to the pattern of changing spatial proportions over time during growth. One example of this is the gradual change in head size relative to body size during human growth. During prenatal growth, from conception to 5 months, the head grows more than the body. In humans, the head comprises almost 50% of total body length at approximately the third month of intrauterine development. By the time of birth the head has decreased to approximately 30% of total body length as a result of the limbs and trunk growing faster than the head. This trend continues postnatally along an axis of increased growth from the head to the feet. Finally, in adults, the head represents approximately 12% of the body length. The cephalocaudal trend is also the trend of infants learning to use their upper limbs before their lower limbs. The proximodistal trend, on the other hand, is the prenatal growth from 5 months to birth when the fetus grows from the inside of the body outwards. When referring to motor development, the proximodistal trend refers to the development of motor skills from the center of the body outwards.
