= Elizabeth L. Bjork =

American cognitive psychologist

Elizabeth Ligon Bjork is an American psychologist. She is the Senior Chair of Psychology and a professor of cognitive psychology at the University of California, Los Angeles. She earned her Bachelor's degree with Honors in Mathematics at the University of Florida in 1963, and her PhD in Psychology at the University of Michigan in 1968. She and her husband Robert A. Bjork received the Association for Psychological Science (previously the American Psychological Society) James McKeen Cattell Fellow Award in 2016. She published Memory (Handbook of Perception and Cognition) in 1998, which was selected as the Outstanding Academic Book by ACRL's Choice in 1997. On top of her research, Bjork received the UCLA Distinguished Teaching Award for Psychology in 2008.

Elizabeth Bjork was one of the founders and has been a long-time leader of the Bjork Learning and Forgetting Lab at UCLA and the Cogfog weekly cognitive psychology research group meeting associated with the lab.
