= Desirable difficulty =

Concept that some difficulty can assist learning

A desirable difficulty, in the context of learning, refers to conditions or aspects of learning that require more effort, but which ultimately improve long-term performance. Although there are many ways to introduce difficulties in learning, only some of these difficulties will be desirable for enhancing learning, comprehension, and future performance. Research suggests that while some approaches to learning may feel slow and difficult, the long-term benefits are greater than with easy tasks.

== Background ==
Many tasks give the illusion of learning because they are easily completed. For example, re-reading notes or a textbook is a common learning tactic that has been proven to be less beneficial than using flashcards. A student may feel like they are learning while re-reading due to the fact that the words are more familiar during the second or third read. However, this does not mean that the material is being processed, internalized, and learned as they may believe. When flashcards are used to test whether a student can generate the definition, this practice is engaging the student's recall of the information. This is a desirable difficulty; although the task is more challenging and requires more effort, it is forcing student to do more complex processing that enhances future performance. At first, learning with desirable difficulties may take longer and the student may not feel as confident, but over time knowledge will be retained better. This concept can transpire between all subject-areas and disciplines, but is most effective in school settings.

The term was first coined by Robert A. Bjork in 1994. The UCLA psychologist introduced the concept as an experience that makes learning more difficult, allowing students to form stronger connections. The idea is that, as the task difficulty increases, learning also increases due to the way it challenges the learner to achieve his optimum performance. The concept grew out of Bjork's work with members of the Bjork Learning and Forgetting Lab.

== Requirements ==
To determine whether a difficulty is desirable, use the following three guidelines:

1. The processing at encoding should be the same as the processing at retrieval.
2. The processing at encoding should be the same as the processing during practice.
3. The task must be able to be accomplished. Too difficult a task may dissuade the learner and prevent full processing.

A model called the challenge point framework can also be used. It is based on the relationship between task difficulty and the ability or the knowledge and skills of the learner. This framework identifies the so-called optimal challenge point (OCP), where the learner obtains the greatest potential for learning.

== Research and examples ==
Researchers have experimented with various methods of learning. A common theme between the methods that have proven to be most beneficial is that they all present difficulties and challenges to the learner. Compared with traditional easier learning methods, they appear to make learning slower. The traditional easy tasks often show better temporary performance effects, and these are confused for more permanent effects. While this is somewhat counterintuitive, studies show that difficulties are better for increased performance in the long run. The following are examples of training tasks that are desirably difficult.

=== Retrieval practice ===
Also known as the testing effect, retrieval practice uses testing as a training tactic. Performance can be improved by devoting some of the learning period to testing by trying to recall the to-be-learned information. An example of this is flashcards, where a student will try to answer what is on the back of a card based on what is written on the front of a card (i.e. a word on the front and its definition on the back). One study found that increasing the pile of flashcards to study at one time, and thereby increasing the difficulty, caused students to perform better on their tests. For best results, feedback is key; the learner should receive feedback on their performance and learn the correct answers.

=== Delayed feedback ===
To improve, students need to receive feedback on their work; feedback could consist of the correct answers, a grade, comments, etc. While feedback is essential, a surprising result found is that delaying feedback is better than receiving immediate feedback. This is contingent on the delayed feedback being guaranteed. Feedback in any form is better than no feedback at all.

Some experts note that, presently, the mechanisms that can precisely cause desirable difficulty effect are not yet well understood.

=== Spacing and interleaving ===
The spacing effect consists of repetitive studying while ensuring that there is a delay between repetitions. If this delay is created through studying another task or subject, the method is known as interleaving. An example of this is reviewing notes from previous weeks every week up until the final. This will space out the review sessions instead of cramming and increase the amount of information that is committed to long-term memory. Spacing has also been found to increase long-term memorization of English syntax. One study found that early elementary school students performed better through distributed learning over time, as opposed to those who were taught using clumped, or massed studying schedules .

Furthermore studies have found that when difficult students are studying difficult material they tend to gravitate towards spaced learning. This was theorized to have happened because of a prior knowledge in the students that spaced learning would help them more deeply understand the subject.

=== Combined techniques ===
Combining desirably difficult techniques in the right ways can be beneficial. For example, the 3R (Read/Recite/Review) technique involves reading a piece of text, reciting the text without looking, and then reviewing the text again. In one experiment, students who used this task performed better than those who simply reread the text. This method takes advantage of two desirable difficulties. The first is that recalling what is written in the text takes considerably more effort than rereading. The second is that during the review stage, students are actively looking for feedback rather than passively receiving feedback in other ways.

== Implications ==
=== For students ===
Students can easily incorporate these techniques into their everyday studying habits to increase their recall. For example, instead of just rereading the material, testing oneself with flashcards will harness the testing effect. Students can also use the spacing effect and interleaving while studying. They can spend time on one subject, then take a break by studying another subject, before returning to the original subject again. This enforces interleaving by mixing several subjects while also spacing out studying over different intervals.

=== For instructors ===
Teachers and professors can utilize spacing by including problems on past topics throughout different homework assignments. They can also utilize the test-a-day method to enforce the testing effect, by requiring students to consistently recall information. Delaying feedback on tests and quizzes is also beneficial, but as long as it is not delayed so long that the students do not read the feedback. One researcher recommends using tests as learning events instead of presentations. When a student is allowed to recall for themselves the information needed, rather than have it told to them, or have to look it up, they learn the material more concretely.

One issue with a majority of current research is that it occurs over a short time span such as a few hours to a couple of days; however, teachers and professors are more interested in ensuring the material they teach remains long term. Through the study of people's recollection of high school Spanish words, Harry Bahrick was able to show that a considerable portion of information learned in a particular class is remembered throughout a person's life and is known as permastore. Bahrick found that spaced post-study sessions promoted permastore for Spanish vocabulary, and likewise, Landauer and Ainslie found that the testing effect increased scores on the information over a year later. The long-term effect over decades is still unknown and being researched.
