= Psychology of learning =

Study of psychological theories of learning

The psychology of learning refers to theories and research on how individuals learn. There are many theories of learning. Some take on a more constructive approach which focuses on inputs and reinforcements. Other approaches, such as neuroscience and social cognition, focus more on how the brain's organization and structure influence learning. Some psychological approaches, such as social behaviorism, focus more on one's interaction with the environment and with others. Other theories, such as those related to motivation, like the growth mindset, focus more on individuals' perceptions of ability.

Extensive research has looked at how individuals learn, both inside and outside the classroom.

== History ==
=== Early approaches ===
Prior to the 1950s, psychological learning theory varied across countries. In Germany, gestalt psychology viewed psychological concepts holistically, such as the human mind and behavior. An emphasis was placed on trying to understand the overarching phenomenon of a psychological concept and how it connects with other ideas. This also led to a focus on problem-solving as a construct to be explored in the 1920s and 1930s.

In America, there was a strong emphasis on behaviorism, which focused on exploring observable behavior. Learning mechanisms were often tested on animals. Russia, or the Soviet Union at the time, provided a cultural-historical approach towards psychology that described learning in the context of one's environment. Learning was viewed as a phenomenon that can be directed and supported in institutions like schools. Another significant theory was Jean Piaget's constructivism, which described how learners construct knowledge by expanding and changing their ideas based on the information they receive. Sigmund Freud's work on psychoanalysis and John Dewey's theories on schooling and learning were also major influences during this time.

=== 1950s–1960s ===
After World War II, two major learning theories became prominent. One was behaviorism, which stemmed from the work of B. F. Skinner and others. Skinner viewed human behavior as determined by an individual's interactions with one's environment. He argued that humans are controlled by external factors such that human learning is predicated on the environmental information one receives from one's surroundings. Starting in the 1960s, behaviorism expanded to consider more complicated forms of learning, such as Albert Bandura's concept of social learning and Dane Thomas Nissen's learning theory of culmination. These could not be explained adequately through behaviorism.

In addition, a humanistic view of psychology, led by psychologists Carl Rogers and Abraham Maslow, grew. In 1951, Rogers introduced the concepts of client-based therapy and introduced related terms such as "student-centered teacher" and "significant learning". Maslow's hierarchy of needs model influenced the psychology of learning because it described how people needed to meet their basic physical, social, and mental needs before they could address other less basic needs.

=== 1970s and beyond ===
During the 1970s, learning began to be viewed as an integral part of life and the world as it started to be seen as a part of personal and social enrichment. Concepts such as lifelong learning and adult education started to appear as people began to view learning as a daily process throughout life.

The Russian cultural-historical approach started to be adopted. This approach viewed learning as interacting with incentives in the environment. For instance, Ute Holzkamp-Osterkamp viewed motivation as interconnected with learning. Lev Vygotsky's zone of proximal development influenced educators to view learning activities in relation to the students' comfort zones.

Kenneth Gergen introduced the social constructionism approach, which posits that individuals construct mental structures from their social connections and environment. Hence, although learning can happen individually, it can only be evaluated in a social context. Jean Lave and Étienne Wenger, in their book Situated Learning, also stated that the environmental context influenced the learning outcomes.

Experiential learning, described by David Kolb, defines learning as an iterative process of experience, reflection, conceptualization, and experimentation. Robert Kegan established a constructive-developmental approach that expands upon Piaget's stages of child development into a lifelong process that includes adulthood. In 1991, the American psychologist Howard Gardner wrote The Unschooled Mind, which focused on three types of learning: intuitive learning, school learning, and expert learning. Intuitive learning, the most natural, occurs mostly in the preschool years; school learning is the learning children engage in during the school years, and intuitive-expert learning is the type of learning Gardner argues everyone should strive towards.

== Psychologists and learning theorists ==
=== Socrates ===
Socrates (469-399 B.C.) introduced a method of learning known as piloting, through which one arrives at one's own answers through power of reasoning. Socrates, in dialogue with Meno, taught this method by teaching a slave boy who knew nothing about Euclidean geometry the Pythagorean theorem. He did so by asking questions or rephrasing them until the correct answer was found. Socrates strongly supported the idea that knowledge is innate and can be found from within, a concept known as anamnesis.

=== Hermann Ebbinghaus ===
Hermann Ebbinghaus (1850—1909) examined learning by studying rote memory and forgetting. With himself as his own experimental subject, he used meaningless syllables to form lists that he read several times until he could restate them with high accuracy. He also attempted to recall the same lists with delays of a few days or months and then recorded his discoveries as learning curves and forgetting curves.

=== Edward Thorndike ===
Edward Thorndike (1874–1949) presented his theory of the "Law of Effect" in 1898. According to this theory, humans and other animals learn behaviors through trial-and-error methods. Once a functioning solution is found, these behaviors are likely to be repeated during the same or similar task. It was his work on learning theory that resulted in operant conditioning within behaviorism. His theory of operant conditioning is learning from the consequences of our actions and behavior.

=== Ivan Pavlov ===
Ivan Petrovich Pavlov (1849–1936), a Russian physiologist, contributed to research on learning. Knowing that a hungry dog salivates when food is present, he trained dogs to salivate to an arbitrary external stimuli. This was done by pairing a natural stimulus (such as food) with a novel stimulus (e.g., a metronome) to provoke the desired response in dogs. That proved his thesis that he could make a dog salivate by just the presentation of the sound of a bell. Pavlov's behavioristic approach to learning became known as classical conditioning.

=== John Broadus Watson ===
John Broadus Watson (1878–1958) also used this method of learning (e.g., he caused a young child, not previously afraid of furry animals, to become frightened of them) and argued that it was sufficient for the science of psychology, specifically behaviorism. Watson is often referred to as being the founder of the school of behaviorism. From 1920 to 1960, this school influenced a great deal of North American psychology. John Watson may also be known as one of the biggest contributors to marketing and advertising, using his knowledge about behaviorism to predict and control responses from the consumers.

=== Burrhus F. Skinner ===
Burrhus F. Skinner (1904-1990) developed operant conditioning, in which specific behaviors resulted from stimuli, which caused them to appear more or less frequently. By the 1920s, John B. Watson's ideas had become popular and influential in the world of psychology and classical conditioning was being explored by other behaviorists. Skinner was one of these behaviorists. He thought that in order to understand behavior we needed to look at the causes of an action and its consequences. He called this operant conditioning. Skinner is referred to as the father of operant conditioning but his theory stems from the works presented by Edward Thorndike.

=== Jean Piaget ===
Jean Piaget is known for his theory of cognitive development that describes how children create a mental model of the world around them. His theory is important because it is one of the first theories that disagreed with the idea that intelligence was a steadfast trait. His theory sees cognitive development as something that happens because of biological maturation and one's interaction with their surrounding environment. Piaget did not want to measure a child's knowledge, like an I.Q. score, instead he focused on how children did with fundamental concepts. Piaget's theory has four stages. The sensorimotor stage which is birth to 18–24 months. The preoperational stage is toddler ages (18–24 months) to early childhood, age 7. The concrete operational stage, ages 7 to 12. Then the formal operation stage which is adolescence to adulthood. Before Piaget's theory it was believed that children were just less competent thinkers but this theory and his stages helped to show that children think in significantly differently ways than adults do.

=== Lev Vygotsky ===
Lev Vygotsky is best known for his theory in cognitive development known as social development theory. Vygotsky was developing his theories of cognitive development around the same time that Jean Piaget was developing his theories. Vygotsky believed that social interaction plays a critical role in cognitive development. He places a large emphasis on culture and how it affects cognitive development. He also sees the importance of adults in cognitive development in children. Vygotsky says that development cannot be understood without referring back to the social and also the cultural context in which it is embedded. Vygotsky claimed that learning occurs via skillful interaction in which the child is with someone who models behaviors or gives instructions for the child to follow, most likely a parent or a teacher. The child tries to understand the instructions or actions provided and then stores the information so they can use it to guide their future performances. Piaget's theory says that a child's development must follow their learning, Vygotsky disagreed with this. He believed that social learning tends to come before development.

== Psychology of learning theories ==
Learning theories are attempts to better understand and explain learning processes. There are several different theories that account for learning. A review of behavioral science research took note of the fact that its samples are widely drawn from Western, educated, industrialized, rich, and democratic (WEIRD) societies, and concluded that these samples are not a strong basis for claims about human nature in a generalized sense.

=== Neuroscience ===
The neuroscience of learning focuses on the relationships among the central nervous system, learning, and behavior. This central nervous system (CNS) is composed of the brain and spinal cord which are responsible for controlling behavior. This differs from the autonomic nervous system which relates with more autonomous functions such as respiration and digestion. Within the CNS, there are neurons, which send messages within and from the brain to the rest of body through electrical and chemical signals. The CNS also has glial cells which assist neurons in the communication process. These neurons communicate and form connections, also called consolidation, to form a person's cognition. Hence, learning, from a neuroscience perspective, focuses on how the organization of this neural network changes through the use and reception of information.

Neuroscience has an explanation for the acquisition of memory. In the brain, there are two types of memory called working memory (WM) and long-term memory (LTM). WM is memory of immediate thoughts; it is a memory that collects, organizes, and retains sensory information for a short time. Information in WM needs to be repeated in order to be retained. LTM, also called permanent memory, is memory that is retained for the long-term. Hence, a concept is considered "learned" when information from WM enters and gets stored into LTM.

Neuroscience also plays a role in related areas such as motivation and self-regulation. Motivation, a psychological component related to learning, also has an explanation through neuroscience. Overall, the brain has a disposition towards rewards and outcomes related to pleasure. In fact, it brings out certain chemicals and opiates that give a natural high increasing a person's motivation. Self-regulation, which plays a significant factor into learning, are also represented by the brain's synaptic connections. These particular connections between self-regulatory activities and tasks help people to regulate their learning.

=== Behaviorism ===
Behaviorism views knowledge as a collection of behavioral responses towards different stimuli in the environment. In behaviorism, learning is promoted by positive reinforcement and reiteration. Throughout the history of psychology, there have been many different behaviorist learning theories. All these theories relate stimulus with response such that a person or animal learns and changes its behavior based upon the stimulus it receives. One significant theory proposed by B.F, Skinner is operant conditioning. This theory claims that the consequences from behaviors will determine future behavior. Consequences to behavior that are positive, and therefore reinforcing, will increase the corresponding behavior. However, consequences that are punishing will decrease behavior.

In a behaviorist perspective, motivation is due to the consequences of behavior and hence completely external. If a consequence is positive, that will further increase one's motivation and eventually one's behavior. On the other hand, if a consequence is negative, one's motivation and behavior will decrease. Behaviorism exists in many current models for learning such as rewards and consequences in classrooms and other incentives like having content mastery goals. However, it does not account for all aspects of learning. Memory, for instance, is not addressed as behaviorism does not consider internal processes. Nevertheless, learning surrounding behaviorism is still very prevalent today.

=== Social cognitive theory ===
Social cognitive theory proposes that much of human learning occurs through the social environment. Many ideas surrounding social cognitive theory were proposed by psychologist Albert Bandura. Unlike behaviorism, which argues that learning is caused through the reinforcement of actions and routines, social cognitive theory provides a cognitive component for learning. For instance, learning can occur purely through observation, where a person can gain knowledge of a concept or acquire an understanding of a rule, attitude, beliefs, without actually acting out any of these respective ideas.

Models also play a significant great role in learning according to social cognitive theory. For instance, a person can gain useful knowledge and understanding through information gained from the model. However, solely observing models does not guarantee one will master the concepts represented in the model. Instead, these models provide information about possible outcomes and inform how the observer should act. Hence, while learning can occur without actually partaking in any enactive learning (learning by doing), the social cognitive theory learning is most effective when it is done enactively and vicariously (learning through observation).

Social cognitive theory describes human behavior as agentic meaning that humans have intentions and agendas that drive their behavior. This perspective explains lot of human learning behavior such as setting goals and regulating one's thoughts, emotions, and behavior for the purpose of learning.

=== Information processing theories ===
Information processing theories focus on the ways information is collected, analyzed, and stored in the human brain. While there is no single information processing theory, there are several theories that can be categorized about information processing theory. One model, proposed by many information processing theorists, is the two-store memory model. Also called the dual memory model, the two-store memory model describes learning as storing information and knowledge from one's environment into one's short-term memory (STM) and eventually into one's long-term memory (LTM). To elaborate, information about your environment is collected through your senses. This information is then entered into your STM, also called working memory (WM). From the STM, some of this information is rehearsed and eventually encoded into the LTM where it is then stored permanently.

Alternate models have been proposed in regards to how information is processed. For instance, some argue that there is one type of memory in the brain which has different levels of processing within it. Nevertheless, the classical model poses memory as dual memory (short-term and long-term) model.

Another related theory is the dual-code theory which splits the brain processes into two systems: an imaginal system and a verbal system. The imaginal system primarily stores concrete events and objects while the verbal system stores more abstract information from language. This theory also allows for knowledge transfer within both systems as images, expressed through verbal language, can be encoded and placed into the imaginal system.

While these theories can be traced back to gestalt psychology, many of these theories were influenced by the rise of technology, neuroscience, and communications.

=== Constructivism ===
Constructivism is a philosophical perspective which argues that much of what one learns and understands about the world is constructed. Constructivists believe that knowledge is created within and reject the idea of pre-existing scientific knowledge waiting to be discovered. With that in mind, constructivists argue that learning needs to be structured so that they challenge students to make sense of new knowledge.

Theories from two major psychologists, Piaget and Vygotsky, form the foundational ideas of constructivism: cognitive constructivism and social constructivism.

==== Cognitive constructivism ====
Cognitive constructivism, stemming from Jean Piaget's theories, sees learning as adding new information to cognitive structures that are already there. Piaget's theory claim that people cognitively develop by passing through several stages: sensorimotor, preoperational, concrete operational, and formal operational.

The sensorimotor stage, which occurs from birth to around age 2, is when children act spontaneously to make sense of their world. Much of these actions are sensory in nature (e.g. touching) and rooted in present action. The preoperational stage occurs between ages 2 to 7 and is categorized by children being able to reflect briefly on the past and imagine the future. However, in the preoperational stage, most of one's thinking in this stage is still grounded in one's experiences in the present. The concrete operational stage, which occurs between ages 7 to 11, is when children rapidly grow cognitively and drastically improve their basic skills and language. Here, children can demonstrate some abstract thinking although much of this thinking is still grounded by actions. The formal operational stage, which starts around age 11 and goes on to adulthood, is the last developmental stage in Piaget's theory. This stage expands upon the concrete operational stage by using higher levels of thinking such as hypothetical thinking, more developed abstract thinking, and idealistic thinking.

Throughout these motivational stages, the mechanism in which the children and people learn, is through a concept called equilibrium. This mechanism is the process where an individual is able to resolve cognitive conflicts by either applying one's beliefs to one's experiences (a process called assimilation) or by changing one's beliefs to accommodate new experiences and information when encountering new situations or concepts.

==== Social constructivism ====
Social constructivism, like its name suggests, believes that knowledge and learning is gained within social situations. Led by psychologist Lev Vygotsky, social constructivism has a more sociocultural approach. This approach argues that the social environment facilitates learning through certain tools such objects, language, and organizations. Through these tools, cognitive learning occurs when the people interact with these tools socially and internalize them.

A major concept within social constructivism is the zone of proximal development (ZPD). ZPD represents the potential amount of learning a student can have given the right environmental conditions. This model suggests that the teacher and student work together to further the student's learning. Educational examples of this include instructional scaffolding and apprenticeships where the educator takes an invested and active role in furthering the knowledge of the student.

=== Motivation ===
Various motivational theories play a role in the psychology of learning. John William Atkinson's motivation theory argues that people are motivated to achieve their best. This motivation is in part moderated by two different sources: the desire to succeed as well as the fear of failure. Another motivational theory is Allan Wigfield's and Jacquelynne Eccles's expectancy-value theory which states that motivation is moderated by one's desire for success as well as the importance of the tasks one needs to do. Self-worth theory also plays a role in learning as students and individuals are motivated to learn and achieve because of their desire to maintain their perception of being high achieving.

Goal theory is another related theory. Learners usually have two types of goals: learning mastery goals (e.g. learning a new concept) and performance goals (e.g. being first place). This theory suggests that mastery goals are more effective than performance goals as a motivator. This is because performance goals may cause people to do more social comparison, such as comparing oneself to others, which may ineffectively raise motivation. Mindsets related to learning also play into motivation. Psychologist Carol Dweck distinguished differences between the growth mindset, the idea that ability is malleable, and the fixed mindset, the idea that ability is fixed. People who incorporate a growth mindset on a certain task tend to have higher motivation. A trial of a brief online growth mindset program raised the grades of lower-achieving ninth-grade students by about 0.10 grade points.

Attribution theory, which discusses how people perceive and attribute a certain behavior or outcome to a certain characteristic, also relates to motivation and learning. According to Bernie Weiner's attribution model, students attribute their academic achievement based on effort, ability, and luck. The way an individual attributes his or her academic performance will determine that person's level of motivation.

Theories related to control also have a major impact to learning. When people begin to perceive that their performance outcomes are not related to their own effort, this can severely limit motivation. At the most extreme, this can lead to learned helplessness which is when a person is experiencing a negative cycle where one's negative beliefs interactions with one's academic failures and motivation.

Various types of motivation also play a role particularly intrinsic and extrinsic motivation. Intrinsic motivation is an inherent type of motivation that one engages as an end to itself. Extrinsic motivation, on the other hand, is a motivation that is provided externally such as external awards or punishments. Research has shown that incentives which reward task engagement lowers intrinsic motivation as it is much like controlling behavior. However, rewards related to one's performance are more effective which can help further one's skill, motivation, and self-efficacy. A 1999 meta-analysis found that rewards, especially tangible ones that were expected, overall reduced people's free-choice interest in an activity. Verbal praise tended to increase interest, with this benefit being bigger for college students than for children.

== See also ==
- Educational psychology
- Media psychology
- Learning theory (education)
- Classical conditioning
- Operant conditioning
