= Varied practice =

In the study of learning and memory, varied practice (also known as variable practice, mixed practice or interleaving) refers to the use of a training schedule that includes frequent changes of task so that the performer is constantly confronting novel instantiations of the to-be-learned information.

The varied practice approach focuses on the distribution of practice in time, the organization of activities to be practiced (blocked vs. random), and the interleaving of information or content to highlight distinctions that facilitate learning. For example, a varied practice approach to learning to shoot a basketball might involve a sequence of ten mid-range jump shots, followed by ten layups, followed by ten free throws, followed by ten three-pointers, with the entire cycle repeating ten times. This contrasts with traditional approaches in which the learner is encouraged to focus on mastering a particular aspect or subset of the relevant information before moving on to new problems (e.g., focusing on free throws before moving to three-pointers). With varied practice, the learner is exposed to multiple versions of the problem even early in training.

== Benefits ==
In many learning domains, varied practice has been shown to enhance the retention, generalization and application of acquired skills. There are many potential sources of the observed advantages. First, greater diversity of the tasks may also allow the learner to extract the most relevant, task-invariant information. Any given practice trial contains both task-relevant and task-irrelevant information. By mixing up the trials, task-irrelevant information will be less consistent, allowing the learner to strip away the spurious associations. Task-relevant information should be constant regardless of the particulars of individual trial.

Second, varied practice creates conditions that are likely to encourage elaborative rehearsal (see Craik & Tulving, 1975). Elaborative rehearsal is a means by which the learner forms multiple associations with the to-be-learned material, so that it can be recalled using a variety of cues. Cognitive psychologists generally regard elaborative rehearsal as one of the most effective means of acquiring new information, and its basic logic – to study the material from a range of perspectives in order to form richer links with preexisting knowledge – is completely consistent with the varied practice approach. Finally, because learners are frequently changing tasks, practice may seem less repetitive, potentially minimizing boredom and increasing the level of engagement during practice.

== Theory ==
The theoretical underpinnings of the varied practice approach stem primarily from a behavioral phenomenon discussed in the skill acquisition literature called contextual interference (Shea & Morgan, 1979). Contextual interference refers to a learning benefit observed when the items to be learned are randomly intermixed across training blocks rather than repeated in blocks (for a review, see Magill and Hall, 1990). That is, when identical items are blocked together during training, post-training performance is worse than when different items are intermixed. Although primarily studied with motor skill learning task, contextual interference was originally reported in a verbal paired associates task (Battig, 1966, 1972) and has been observed in other non-motor tasks (e.g., Carlson et al., 1989). The benefits of mixed-item blocks are apparent only some period of time after practice, indicating that the effects are primarily long-term.

The source of contextual interference is not well understood. At present, it is primarily an empirical phenomenon. Most accounts assume that it emerges because blocked practice is not sufficiently demanding to produce optimal effort or attention. Consistent with this view, contextual interference is reduced or eliminated with more complex tasks (see Wulf & Shea, 2002). Across the various accounts of this complexity effect, the dominant theme is that as complexity increases, learners benefit more from the opportunity to repeat and refine their responses on successive trials. There is also debate regarding whether children show the effects of contextual interference as adult learners. Some studies suggest children show normal contextual interference (e.g., Edwards et al., 1986) whereas others show no effect in children (e.g., Del Rey et al., 1983). Moreover, as with adults, more difficult or complex tasks show less contextual interference (Magill & Hall, 1990). Thus, the absence of contextual interference in some studies with children may simply be another manifestation of the task complexity effect.

== Similar to ==
Contextual interference bears an intriguing similarity to a phenomenon observed during the training of neural networks called catastrophic interference (McCloskey & Cohen, 1989). Catastrophic interference occurs when a network is trained to criteria on one set of mappings, and then switched to a new set, at which point it loses access to the initial mappings. In a sense, rather than forming a set of connections that would preserve the knowledge it acquired in the first task, the network optimizes its performance completely to the new task. The solution to this problem is simply to interleave the training sets so that the network is forced to optimize its behavior in a way that is sensitive to both of the tasks and their statistics. While this was not thought to characterize human learning (a supposed weakness of this approach), recent evidence suggests that human learning also exhibits this principle under the right conditions (Mirman & Spivey, 2001).

== In science ==
Neuroscience techniques have recently been applied to investigating the effects of varied practice. Because these effects are typically only observed after a considerable delay, these studies have focused on the neural changes occurring during the consolidation period. For example, Kantak and colleagues (2010) used repetitive transcranial magnetic stimulation (rTMS) immediately after varied practice of a motor task and, in a separate group of participants, after traditional constant practice of the same task. When the rTMS was applied over the prefrontal cortex, performance 24 hours after training was much worse than immediately after training. In contrast, when the rTMS was applied over primary motor cortex, performance 24 hours after training improved similarly to a control group that received no rTMS. Thus, disruption of neural activation in the prefrontal cortex after varied practice appears to eliminate its benefits. In contrast, when a constant practice schedule was used, all groups performed worse 24 hours after training than immediately after training, and the group receiving rTMS over the primary motor cortex performed much worse than either the prefrontal or control groups. In sum, the findings suggest that varied and constant practice engage distinct sets of neural regions, the former involving the prefrontal cortex and the latter involving primary motor cortex.

== In education ==
The practical benefits for varied practice in the educational domain may be largely untapped. Dempster and Corkill (1999) argued that the available evidence warranted focused investigations of the role of these underlying processes (cognitive inhibition and contextual interference) to the teaching-learning process. More recently, Rohrer and his colleagues studied the benefits of varied practice in mathematics curricula. Rohrer and Taylor (2007) noted that, contrary to the basic science supporting the varied practice approach, most mathematics textbooks had each set of practice sections made up almost entirely of problems corresponding to the immediately previous lesson; only in a small number of cases did they find the practice problems to be systematically shuffled so that each practice set includes a variety of problems drawn from many previous lessons. They concluded that varied practice was underused.

Apfelbaum, Hazeltine and McMurray (2013) found consistent benefits of varied practice for children learning phonics regularities in English. Children who practiced the vowel rules of English in varied consonant contexts showed substantially stronger learning of the vowel rules than children who practiced in constrained contexts. These benefits of varied practice included generalization to new tasks and new items. This finding contrasts with the common phonics practice of emphasizing "word families," in which students practice phonics rules in sets of highly similar items (e.g. cat, hat, pat, bat).

In sum, there are clear applications for varied practice for students and educators alike; tapping these principles could improve generalization of knowledge and long-term retention.
