= Retrieval-induced forgetting =

Memory phenomenon

Example of RIF in Goodmon & Anderson (2011), Experiment 1.
Item Type	Avg. Recall
Rp+	81%
NRp	68%
Rp-	55%
Average recall of items at final test. Goodmon and Anderson (2011) showed not only that prior retrieval enhances later retrieval of those same words (Rp+ items), but that remembering words related to practiced words (Rp- items) can suffer as a result of prior retrieval compared to unrelated words (NRp items). By comparing the recall for Rp- and NRp items, the experiment showed a 13% RIF effect.

Retrieval-induced forgetting (RIF) is a memory phenomenon where remembering causes forgetting of other information in memory. The phenomenon was first demonstrated in 1994, although the concept of RIF has been previously discussed in the context of retrieval inhibition.

RIF is demonstrated through a three-phase experiment consisting of study, practice of some studied material, and a final test of all studied material. Such experiments have also used multiple kinds of final tests including recall using only category cues, recall using category and word stems, and recognition tests. The effect has been produced using many different kinds of materials, can be produced in group settings, and is reduced in special clinical populations.

Although RIF occurs as a consequence of conscious remembering through explicit retrieval, the actual forgetting is thought to occur implicitly, below the level of awareness. Cognitive psychologists continue to debate why RIF occurs, and how it relates to the larger picture of memory and general cognition. In particular, researchers are divided on the idea of whether the forgetting is caused by a process that actively inhibits information, or due to interference from other information in memory. Inhibition associated with RIF has been looked at as similar to forms of physical inhibition. RIF has also been tied to memory retrieval strategies, with disrupting such strategies affecting the phenomenon.

== Prior and related research ==
Tasks requiring inhibitory control by locus of effect and intentionality
	Item Level	Context Level
Low Intentionality	retrieval-induced forgetting part-set cuing	context change
Medium Intentionality	think/no-think proactive interference	retroactive interference
High Intentionality	N/A	list-method directed forgetting

Although the term "retrieval-induced forgetting" was first used in 1994, it was described in an earlier review by Robert A. Bjork in terms of suppressing memories that become active but are not relevant for a given situation. Bjork described a study by Neely and Durgunoğlu who found that participants were slower at recognizing words when they were shown a related word immediately beforehand. The researchers hypothesized that participants were actually trying to suppress the related words during recognition, as it was irrelevant and unhelpful information in completing the recognition task. Since the time of Bjork's original description of this phenomenon, an important portion of his cognitive psychology research performed with members of the Bjork Learning and Forgetting Lab and the Cogfog group at UCLA has explored various aspects of retrieval-induced forgetting.

RIF is similar to some other memory phenomena. It is comparable to part-set cuing in that both show lowered memory performance given some previously studied information. In one example of part-set cuing, people asked to recall as many as U.S. states as they could remembered more states than those asked to after being shown the names of some states beforehand. Having been cued with a portion of the to-be-recalled information, recall performance worsened. RIF is also related to forgetting attributable to changes in one's context where the forgetting is automatic and without awareness. Output interference is a related phenomenon, where generation of words from a category such as fruits can make other words from the category harder to remember, or cause perseverations where participants repeat already-remembered words.

== Retrieval-practice paradigm ==
RIF has been shown in retrieval-practice paradigm experiments, with exact instructions and procedures varying slightly from experiment to experiment. In the original version of the experiment, booklets were used to present stimuli and to complete testing. Since then this procedure has often been done using computer software such as Microsoft PowerPoint or E-Prime. The experiments typically consist of study, retrieval-practice, and test phases.

=== Study phase ===
In the study phase, participants are asked to study word pairs that consist of a category name and a word that belongs to that category, an example being FRUIT–orange. Typically multiple word pairs across a number of categories, say 48 items divided equally into 8 categories, are used. Among several others, participants might study word pairs such as the following:

METAL–iron
TREE–birch
METAL–silver
TREE–elm

=== Retrieval-practice phase ===
A subset of the items are tested using a fill-in-the-blank test. For a given item, the participant is shown the category name and the first two letters of a studied word from that category (e.g. METAL–ir______). Participants are instructed to fill in the blank with an appropriate studied word from that category. Participants will typically practice remembering the items multiple times. The retrieval-practice phase splits items into three different types that are of interest during the final test, and are often denoted using the following notation:

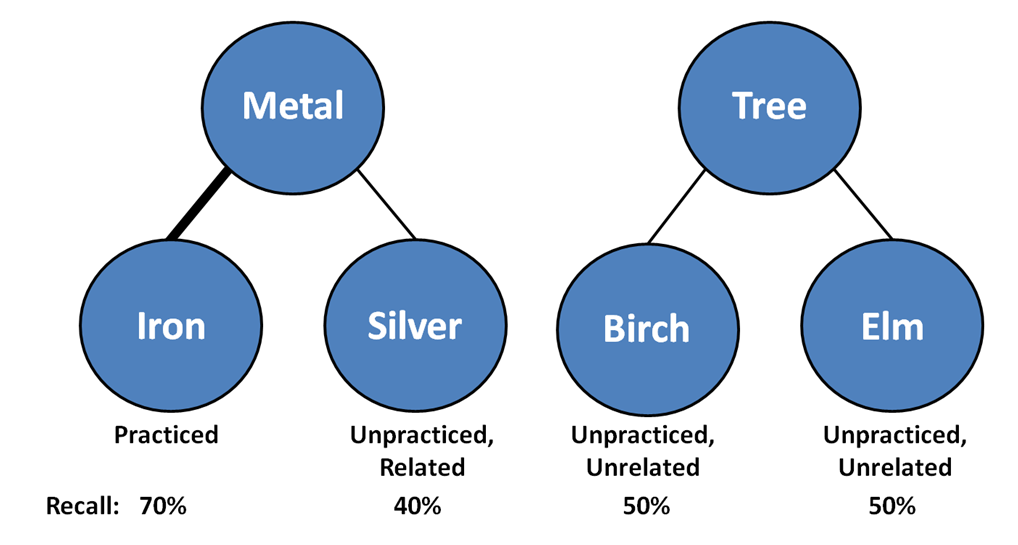
Diagram describing dependent variables and hypothetical average recall at final test in the retrieval practice paradigm for different item types. These items are different based on 1) whether they were practiced or unpracticed and 2) what their relationship is to practiced items.

- Practiced items (Rp+ items) are studied words that participants attempt to remember during retrieval practice.
- Unpracticed–related items (Rp- items) are studied words that are not practiced, but related (by category) to words that were practiced.
- Unpracticed–unrelated items (NRp items) are studied words in categories that are never practiced. These categories are typically unrelated to practiced categories. These items also serve as a baseline to compare to unpracticed–related items.

=== Test phase ===
After retrieval practice, participants are given a final test, where they are asked to remember all studied items. The goal of the test phase is to assess whether prior retrieval practice affects how well the unpracticed–related words are remembered compared to the unpracticed–unrelated words. RIF is ultimately measured as the difference between the proportion of items recalled between these two types.

In a category-cued test, one studied category is shown at a time and participants are asked to remember all studied items from that category. Although a set amount of time is given for each category, the exact amount of time varies across studies. For instance, Anderson and co-researchers, in 1994, gave participants 30 seconds for each category cue (and given that there were 6 words in each category, this meant that participants had 5 seconds, on average, to remember each item). Other studies have used longer durations.

Category-plus-stem-cued tests add a word stem to the category cue. Typically, for each category, participants are given a specific number of letters corresponding to a unique studied word from the category. Because these cues are specific to a particular word, participants are given relatively less time to respond to each cue compared to category-cued tests. Response times for each cue vary from study to study, although many experiments have used an interval of 10 seconds, though some studies have reported using response times as few as 3 seconds. Typically, category-plus-stem-cued tests include only the first initial letter from the word, but some have included multiple letters.

Recognition tests do not require participants to produce a word from memory. Instead participants are literally shown a word, and are asked to report whether it was a word that appeared during the study phase. Recognition tests typically show all of the studied words and a number of non-studied words, the lures. Researchers measure how often participants correctly recognize studied items, and how often they incorrectly recognize lures. The difference between these two proportions is a statistic measuring one's ability to discriminate between studied and non-studied items, and has been used to represent RIF. Reaction time is also used to represent RIF, where slower reaction times are thought to represent more RIF due to difficulty in recognizing the studied item.

== General findings ==
RIF studies have generally yielded results where, on average, unpracticed–related words are remembered less well than the baseline of unpracticed–unrelated words.

=== Generality of RIF ===
RIF studies have generally used words from basic and easily recognized categories, but the effects have been shown with a wide variety of stimuli:

- Homographs: Retrieving a non-dominant meaning of a word can cause forgetting of its dominant meaning.
- Words based on their lexical properties: Words categorized by having the same initial letters have shown RIF on the basis of this shared property.
- Visuo-spatial information: When stimuli are categorized by the basis of its location, RIF has been shown given practice of a subset of items in a given location.
- Propositional information: Remembering a set of studied propositional statements can produce RIF for other propositional statements that have shared relations, even if the subject of the sentence differs.
- Details of a mock crime scene: Remembering information about one type of item previously viewed in a mock crime scene produces RIF for similar items in the same crime scene.
- Personality traits of others: Remembering some personality traits for a given person has caused RIF for other traits of that same person.

=== Modifications to retrieval-practice phase ===
Although the typical paradigm includes retrieval practice of previously studied words, some studies have shown RIF even when participants were asked to retrieve something else. For instance, RIF has occurred even when participants generated new, unstudied items from previously studied categories in what is called "extra-list retrieval practice" or "semantic generation." In a method called "impossible retrieval practice," RIF has also been observed when participants were asked to generate a word for a category, even though one did not actually exist. RIF is still observed at final test in cases where successful retrieval is not possible, such as one where having studied a number of fruits a participant is asked to generate a word given a cue resembling FRUIT–wu. Some studies have also examined the effect on RIF when participants, instead of being asked to perform retrieval practice, are given additional study trials making them restudy the material instead of remembering prior information. In these cases, participants have failed to show any RIF effects.

=== RIF studies in special populations ===
Because RIF is an effect related to the accessibility of information, researchers have studied whether it persists in populations that have certain disorders related to memory. In one study of students diagnosed with ADHD, the degree of RIF observed compared to a control group depended on the kind of final test used. When using a category-cued test, there were no differences in RIF compared to a control group. However, when a category-plus-stem-cued test was used, participants with ADHD, on average, showed less RIF than controls. Patients with depression show no RIF compared to controls when using a category-plus-stem-cued test. Patients with schizophrenia show comparable RIF effects to control groups under a category-cued test, but reduced RIF using a recognition test.

=== Socially-shared RIF ===
The effects of studying or remembering information in groups has also been examined. When groups of individuals experience an event together, and then jointly remember the event, conditions are created for retrieval induced forgetting to occur. Selective remembering in the conversation induces both Speakers and Listeners in the conversation to forget unmentioned, but related to the mentioned, memories (Rp-) to a larger degree than unmentioned, but unrelated to the mentioned memories (NRp). This effect is called socially-shared RIF, and can even occur with flashbulb memories, which are memories of circumstances in which one learned about consequential events. One example of this phenomenon is when Americans influence each other's memories of the September 11th attacks by communicating with one another about these memories. More specifically, remembering a subset of details about the event causes RIF for other related, critical information about the event. Importantly, simply listening to somebody remembering her September 11 memories results in induced forgetting in one's own memories.

Of note, this particular phenomenon of SSRIF has been linked to how communities of individuals form collective memories of the past by selectively retrieving information in conversational interactions.

== Theoretical explanations ==
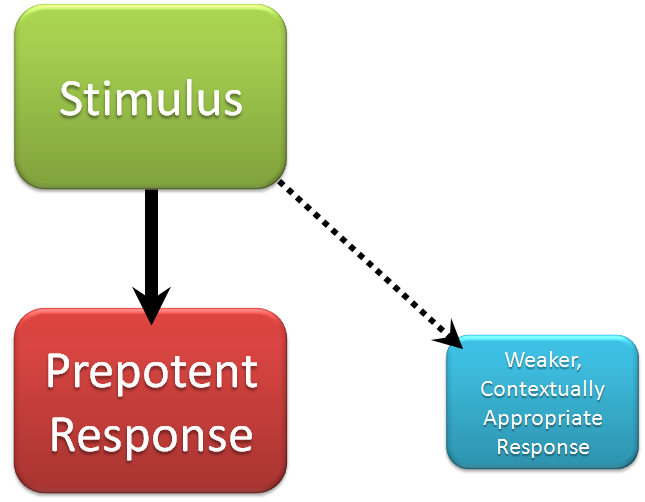
Diagram describing when an inhibitory response would be required. According to the inhibitory account of RIF, when prepotent memories are active but inappropriate in response to a cue, they are inhibited in order to access a less accessible but contextually appropriate memory.

=== Interference ===
Many instances of forgetting are often accounted to the interference from heightened accessibility of other, associated information in memory. Researchers have described how interference may explain RIF in a number of ways. For instance the theory of blocking suggests that because practiced words are more easily remembered at test, they may occupy a "response channel" in memory and effectively prevent unpracticed–related words in memory from being remembered. Unpracticed–unrelated words would be less affected by this blocking effect because retrieval of practiced words would not block items from different categories. Other theories such as resource diffusion and response decrement are similar to blocking. These theories describe retrieval processes as a finite set of resources that cannot be distributed adequately enough to unpracticed–related items at test.

Other models of interference have been proposed that more precisely define the idea of an item's strength in memory through separating the strength of item itself in memory and the contextual information it is linked to. Such models may explain why certain strengthening methods predict RIF and others do not.

=== Inhibition ===
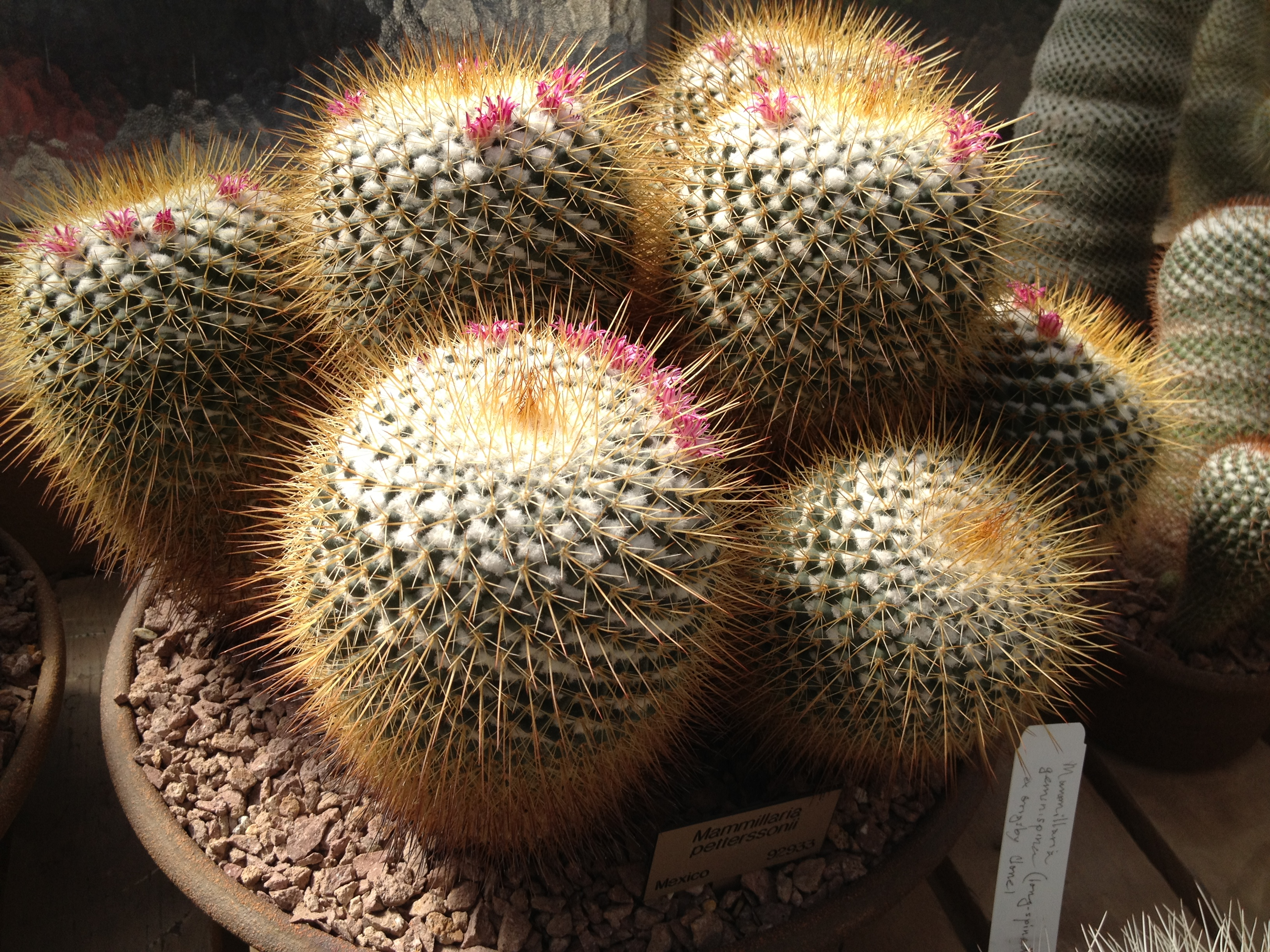
If one were to notice a potted plant falling, one might automatically react so as to catch it. However, upon noticing it was a cactus, inhibitory processes would work to withhold that action. A similar process could work with memories that are prepotent but inappropriate for a given situation.

Generally speaking, inhibition theory assumes the existence of a set of processes that allows the suppression of memories. Central to the inhibition account of RIF is that access to unpracticed–related items is actively suppressed by this inhibitory process during retrieval-practice. For instance, when participants perform retrieval practice, the category cue may activate many associated items. The degree to which related, but inappropriate associates, that is unpracticed–related words, become accessible serves as a source of competition that disrupts retrieval of an appropriate response. To resolve this competition, an inhibitory process intervenes to suppress accessibility to such items. Subsequently, this suppression facilitates retrieval of an appropriate item and prevents retrieval of contextually inappropriate items. Items from unrelated categories, that is unpracticed–unrelated items, are less competitive during retrieval practice and thus, require less inhibition. At final test, the consequences of the suppression persist, and previously competitive items that were inhibited become more difficult to remember.

This reduction in accessibility is consistent with the definition of inhibition proposed by Robert A. Bjork: that inhibition is an active, direct form of suppression that serves to reduce access to one or several responses for some adaptive purpose.

Memory inhibition in reference to RIF has sometimes been likened to processes of inhibition associated with motor control, such as those responsible for baseball players stopping their swing when they anticipate a ball. Similarly, when a dominant response in memory is inappropriate, inhibitory processes must be recruited to temporarily suppress that response so that a more appropriate one can be retrieved. In addition, recent studies indicate an increase in the activity of the frontal cortex during the manifestation of the RIF phenomenon, which speaks in favor of increased cognitive control inhibiting the retrieval of related non-target information.

=== Other accounts ===
Individual strategies in retrieval have been considered as one way RIF might occur, in that retrieval practice may be inconsistent with the way participants remember items studied from those categories. If retrieval practice disrupts participants' memory strategy, it may affect their ability to remember particular items at final test. If participants are preparing to remember items during retrieval-practice based on some strategy, certain presentation orders may disrupt that strategy whereas others may not. For instance, when participants practice items in the same order as presented during study, RIF is lower compared to when presentation is random during retrieval practice. These results are the same even when participants are explicitly instructed to remember the order in which items are presented during study.
