= Memory cells (motor cortex) =

Scientific concept related to the somatic motor system

Memory cells are found in the primary motor cortex (M1), a region located in the posterior portion of the frontal lobe of the brain. Their behavior is described by Bizzi et al. as:

- In a baseline epoch (no force field on the end effector), they have one preferred direction
- In a force perturbation epoch, they show a change in the preferred direction
- In a subsequent washout epoch (no force field on the end effector), the change in preferred direction persists.
