= Challenge point framework =

Theoretical basis related to motor learning

The challenge point framework, created by Mark A. Guadagnoli and Timothy D. Lee (2004), provides a theoretical basis to conceptualize the effects of various practice conditions in motor learning. This framework relates practice variables to the skill level of the individual, task difficulty, and information theory concepts. The fundamental idea is that “motor tasks represent different challenges for performers of different abilities” (Guadagnoli and Lee 2004, p212). Any task will present the individual with a certain degree of challenge. However, the learning potential from this task difficulty level will differ based on the:

1. skill level of the performer
2. task complexity
3. task environment

Importantly, though increases in task difficulty may increase learning potential, increased task difficulty is also expected to decrease performance. Thus, an optimal challenge point exists when learning is maximized and detriment to performance in practice is minimized.

== Importance and applications ==
Practice has been proposed as the most important factor for the “relatively permanent” improvement in the ability to perform motor skills (Adams 1964; Annett 1969; Fitts 1964; Magill 2001; Marteniuk 1976; Newell 1981; Salmoni et al. 1984; Schmidt and Lee 1999; Guadagnoli and Lee 2004). With all other variables held constant, skill increases with practice (Guadagnoli and Lee 2004). However, time devoted to practice can be made more efficient by careful consideration of practice conditions. The challenge point framework presents a theoretical perspective to consider the roles of the level of the performer, the complexity of the task and the environment in regulating the learning potential during practice. Adjustment of these components to enhance motor learning can be applied to variety of contexts, including rehabilitation (Descarreaux et al. 2010; Onla-or & Winstein 2008) and simulation-based health professions education (Gofton 2006).

== History ==
The challenge point framework involves concepts generated through various lines of research including information theory, communications theory, and information processing (Lintern and Gopher 1978; Martenuik 1976; K.M. Newell et al. 1991; Wulf and Shea 2002). Specific notions borrowed from prior research important to understanding the theoretical framework include:

1. Learning is a problem-solving process in which the goal of an action represents the problem to be solved and the evolution of a movement configuration represents the performer’s attempt to solve the problem (Miller et al. 1960 as cited by Guadagnoli and Lee 2004).
2. Sources of information available during and after each attempt to solve a problem are remembered and form the basis for learning, which is defined as a relatively permanent improvement in skill that results from practice (Guthrie 1952 as cited by Guadagnoli and Lee 2004).
3. Two sources of information are critical for learning:
  1. An action plan is a construct that invokes intention and ultimately results in a specific movement configuration on a given performance (Miller et al. 1960 as cited by Guadagnoli and Lee 2004). See motor control.
  2. Feedback may be inherent to the individual (e.g. vision) or available via external, augmented sources (e.g. verbal instruction).
4. Information is transmitted only when uncertainty is reduced (Shannon and Weaver 1949; Fitts 1954; Fitts and Posner 1967; Legge and Barber 1967; Martenuik 1976; Miller 1956 as cited by Guadagnoli and Lee 2004).

== Components ==
It follows from the description of the challenge point framework that:

- It is impossible to learn without information
- Learning is impaired by presentation of insufficient or excessive amounts of information
- Learning is facilitated by an optimal amount of information, which depends on individual skill and task difficulty

=== Information available and task difficulty ===
Learning is fundamentally a problem-solving process. It has been proposed that with practice, there is reduced information available to the participant because better expectations are formed (i.e. practice = redundancy, therefore less uncertainty; Marteniuk 1976). However, increasing functional task difficulty results in less certainty about the predicted success of the action plan and the nature of the feedback. At low levels of functional difficulty, the potential available information is low for performers in all skill levels. As functional task difficulty increases, the potential information available increases exponentially for beginners and less rapidly for intermediate and skilled performers. For experts, the potential information available increases only at the highest levels of functional task difficulty.

=== Task difficulty and skill ===
Task difficulty has received considerable attention in prior research (Fleighman and Quaintance 1984; Gentile 1998). Important to the challenge point framework, task difficulty is not explicitly defined. Alternately, two broad categories can encompass these elements:

- Nominal task difficulty
  - Difficulty due to the characteristics of the task only, reflecting a constant amount of task difficulty (e.g. the target of a throw being near versus far); includes perceptual and motor performance requirements (Swinnen et al. 1992).
- Functional task difficulty
  - Difficulty due to the person performing the task and the environment (e.g. two individuals, a major league pitcher and an inexperienced ball thrower, are asked to throw a baseball as fast as they can to first base on two days, one on a sunny day and the other on a windy day).

Performance of a task with low nominal difficulty will be expected to be high in all groups of performers (i.e. all skill levels). However, beginner performance will be expected to decline rapidly as nominal difficulty increases, whereas intermediate and skilled performance will decline less rapidly, and expert performance is expected to decline only at the highest nominal difficulty levels.

Although the "Expert" skill level is useful to explain this framework, one may argue that experts should have a high level of predicted success for all nominal task difficulties. It is possible that once expertise is attained, these individuals are able to predict the outcome of the ongoing task and modify ongoing processes in order to reach a suitable outcome (e.g. surgeons).

=== Optimal challenge points ===
The optimal challenge point represents the degree of functional task difficulty an individual of a specific skill level would need to optimize learning (Guadagnoli and Lee 2004). However, this learning depends on the amount of interpretable information. Therefore, although increases in task difficulty may increase learning potential, only so much is interpretable, and task performance is expected to decrease. Thus, an optimal challenge point exists when learning is maximized and detriment to performance in practice is minimized. With increased practice it is assumed that one's information-processing capabilities will increase (Marteniuk 1976). Therefore, the optimal challenge point will change as the individual's ability to use information changes, requiring further changes in functional difficulties in task to facilitate learning (Guadagnoli and Lee 2004).

== Practice variables and framework predictions ==
=== Contextual interference (CI) and action planning ===
Predictions from the challenge point framework with respect to CI (refer to motor learning; Guadagnoli and Lee 2004, p 219):

1. "For tasks with differing levels of nominal difficulty, the advantage of random practice (vs. blocked practice) for learning will be largest for tasks of lowest nominal difficulty and smallest for tasks of highest nominal difficulty".
2. "For individuals with differing skill levels, low levels of CI will be better for beginning skill levels and higher levels of CI will be better for more highly skilled individuals".

=== Knowledge of results (KR) and feedback information ===
Predictions from the challenge point framework with respect to KR (refer to motor learning; Guadagnoli and Lee 2004, p221):

1. "For tasks of high nominal difficulty, more frequent or immediate presentation of KR, or both, will yield the largest learning effect. For tasks of low nominal difficulty, less frequent or immediate presentation of KR, or both, will yield the largest learning effect".
2. "For tasks about which multiple sources of augmented information can be provided, the schedule of presenting the information will influence learning. For tasks of low nominal difficulty, a random schedule of augmented feedback presentation will facilitate learning as compared with a blocked presentation. For tasks high in nominal difficulty, a blocked presentation will produce better learning than a random schedule
