= Proximodistal trend =

The proximodistal trend is the tendency for more general functions of limbs to develop before more specific or fine motor skills. It comes from the Latin words proxim- which means "close" and "-dis-" meaning "away from", because the trend essentially describes a path from the center outward.
