= A. ciliata =

A. ciliata may refer to:

- Aaptos ciliata, a sea sponge
- Acalypha ciliata, a plant found in Africa, the Arabian Peninsula, and South Asia
- Acraga ciliata, a Jamaican moth
- Adventina ciliata, a synonym of Galinsoga quadriradiata, a plant native to central Mexico
- Aediodes ciliata, a synonym of Desmia ciliata, an Indian moth
- Aglaura ciliata, a synonym of Aglaura hemistoma, a deep-sea hydrozoan
- Agonista ciliata, a synonym of Lygniodes ciliata, an Asian moth
- Amsonia ciliata, commonly called the fringed bluestar, a North American plant
- Anonymos ciliata, a synonym of Liatris pilosa, a plant native to the United States
- Apluda ciliata, a synonym of Apluda mutica, a grass found in Asia as well as Indian and Pacific Ocean islands
- Arenaria ciliata, commonly called the fringed sandwort, a European plant
- Aristida ciliata, a synonym of Stipagrostis ciliata, a grass found in the Canary Islands, the Sahara Desert, and Pakistan
- Asperula ciliata, a synonym of Asperula ciliata, commonly called the Caucasian crosswort
- Asterias ciliata, a synonym of Ophiura ophiura, a European brittle star
