= Homaxinella balfourensis =

Scientific classification
- Kingdom: Animalia
- Phylum: Porifera
- Class: Demospongiae
- Order: Suberitida
- Family: Suberitidae
- Genus: Homaxinella
- Species: H. balfourensis

Binomial name
- Homaxinella balfourensis (Ridley & Dendy, 1886

Synonyms
- List: Axinella balfourensis Ridley & Dendy, 1886; Axinella supratumescens Topsent, 1907; Homaxinella supratumescens (Topsent, 1907)

Species of sponge

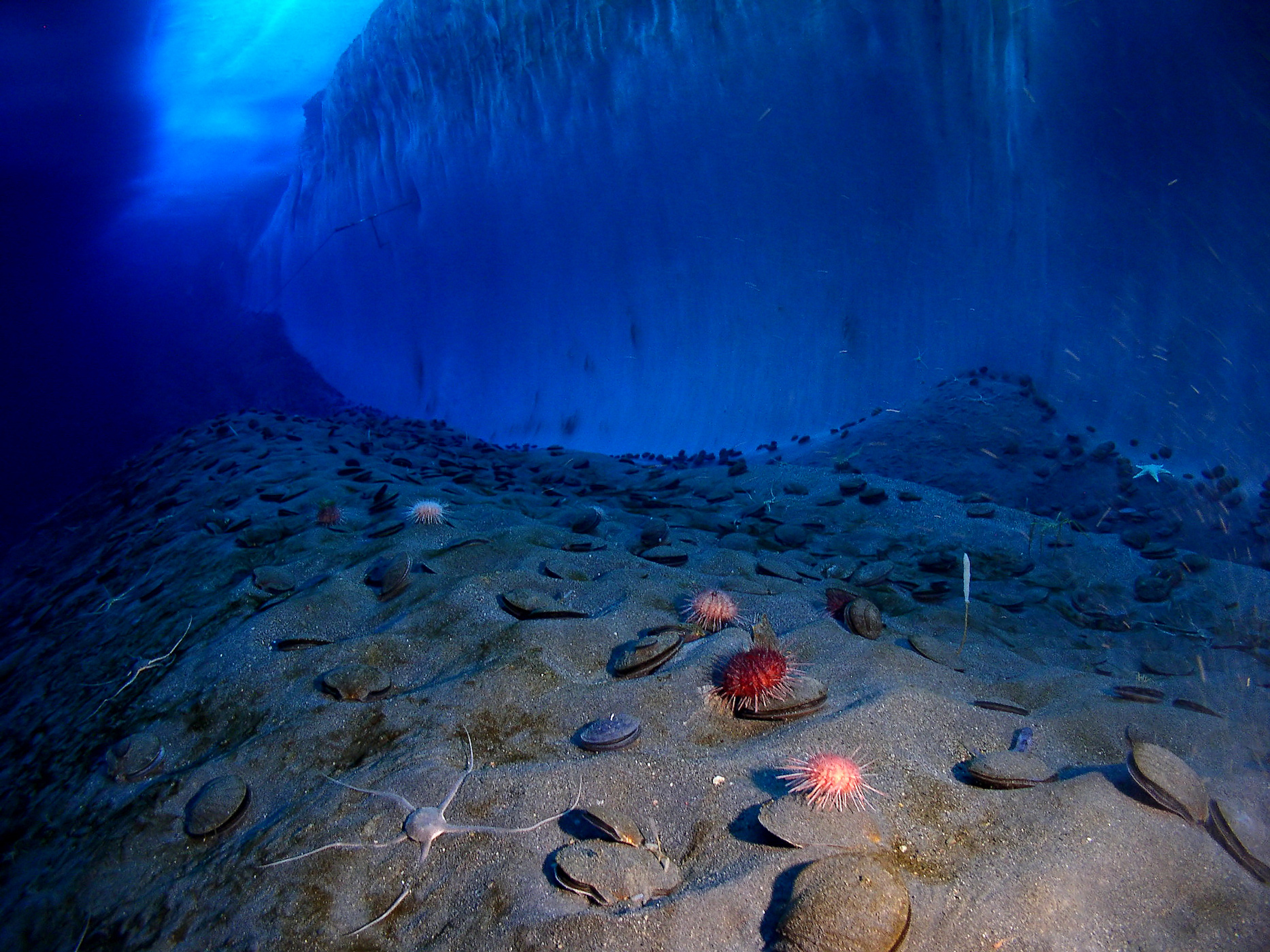

Homaxinella balfourensis is a species of sea sponge in the family Suberitidae. It is found in the seas around Antarctica and can grow in two forms, either branching out in one plane like a fan or forming an upright club-like structure.

== Description ==
Homaxinella balfourensis is attached to the substrate by roots and has creeping stolons. It is usually arborescent with a main trunk and a dichotomous branching habit of growth but can also be clavate, thickening upwards like a club. The lower branches are stout and cylindrical while the upper branches are soft and spongy and are sometimes clavate themselves. It can grow to a length of 50 centimetres (20 in) with flattened branches up to 10 centimetres (3.9 in) long and 0.8 centimetres (0.31 in) wide. The surface of the sponge is smooth and ranges in colour from white, cream or orange to light grey. The silicaceous stiffening elements in the sponge's skeleton are called spicules, and the type and shape of these plays an important part in the identification of sponges. Homaxinella balfourensis has an axially condensed, choanosomal skeleton of spicules with an extra-axial skeleton of bundles of larger spicules known as megascleres. These come in various sizes but all are of the type known as styles, with one end pointed and the other end rounded. There are also a large number of randomly arranged, disconnected styles. There are no microscleres.

== Distribution ==
Homaxinella balfourensis is found in the cold seas around Antarctica at depths down to about 500 metres (1,600 ft). Its range includes the Antarctic Peninsula, the South Shetland Islands, South Georgia and the Kerguelen Islands.

== Biology ==
Homaxinella balfourensis is a filter feeder. Water circulates through the sponge, entering through small openings, the ostia, and leaving through larger oscula. Oxygen and food particles are removed from the water in the process and waste products are carried away. The food-capturing cells are called choanocytes and have flagella which beat synchronously, creating a current which draws water through the sponge and past the cells. The flagella ensnare food particles which are then engulfed. These cells often contain symbiotic diatoms, minute photosynthetic algae. These use carbohydrates manufactured by the sponge but also create sugars by photosynthesis when there is sufficient light. These diatoms benefit from the protection the sponge provides which enhances their prospects for survival in the Antarctic winter.

Anchor ice sometimes develops on the seabed in shallow Antarctic waters due to the supercooling of water and the deposition of large ice crystals. The sponge can be mechanically damaged by these crystals growing among its branches. Affected sponges become discoloured and may be eliminated altogether from some areas by blanketing ice.

== Ecology ==
Many predators find the spicules of Homaxinella balfourensis distasteful but the sea stars Odontaster meridionalis and Odontaster validus feed on it, leaving behind the spongin which provides a fibrous support to the sponge. Small copepods in the family Arcturidae are often to be found among the sponge's branches. Homaxinella balfourensis often grows on the upper valve of the Antarctic scallop (Adamussium colbecki) when these shells reach a length of at last 7 centimetres (2.8 in), usually being attached near the shell margin where the sponge may benefit from an increased flow of water.

== Research ==
Homaxinella balfourensis produces secondary metabolites which have antibacterial and antifungal properties. The sponge also produces antifreeze proteins that lower the freezing point of water within its cells, preventing freezing. These have potential for use as antifreeze agents in agriculture, the food industry and medicine.
