= Pseudospongosorites =

Scientific classification
- Kingdom: Animalia
- Phylum: Porifera
- Class: Demospongiae
- Order: Suberitida
- Family: Suberitidae
- Genus: Pseudospongosorites; McCormack & Kelly, 2002
- Species: P. suberitoides

Binomial name
- Pseudospongosorites suberitoides (Díaz, van Soest & Pomponi, 1993)

Synonyms
- (Species): Spongosorites suberitoides Díaz, van Soest & Pomponi, 1993

Genus of sponges

Pseudospongosorites is a genus of sea sponges belonging to the family Suberitidae. Currently, the genus is considered as monotypic, consisting of a single species Pseudospongosorites suberitoides. It is found in the Caribbean Sea, the Gulf of Mexico and on the Atlantic coast of the United States as far north as North Carolina. This species is known by the common name Florida hermit crab sponge, so named because hermit crabs often use it as shelter.

== Taxonomy ==
Pseudospongosorites suberitoides was originally thought to represent a species in the genus Suberites, due to its superficial resemblance and similar ecology. Suberites contains nearly all other sponges known as the 'hermit crab sponges,' most notably Suberites domuncula. However the Suberites hermit crab sponges are only found in deep water greater than 20m, while Pseudospongosorites suberitoides is usually found in shallow water near shore. In 1993 the species was named as a species in the genus Spongosorites, under the family Halichondriidae and order Halichondrida, with its similarities to Suberites attributed to convergent evolution. Genetic work in 2002 led to its current classification as the sole member of a new genus under family Suberitidae and order Hadromerida.

== Description ==
P. suberitoides has a smooth, waxy texture and is slightly compressible. It can grow over 10 centimeters long. It is polymorphic, typically appearing as green, brown, or tan, but approximately 10% of specimens are bright orange. Dead, desiccated specimens that may wash up on a beach are often turquoise-blue. All P. suberitoides specimens contain gemmules, which are not usually produced by marine sponges.

== Distribution ==
P. suberitoides is mostly found in the Caribbean Sea and the Gulf of Mexico, though a few specimens have been collected from the North Carolina coast. They may occur in greatest abundance on the shores of the Apalachee Bay, along the Gulf Coast in northwestern Florida.

== Ecology ==
P. suberitoides colonizes gastropod shells, especially those of the genus Cantharus. These shells are typically empty (dead), but P. suberitoides has been known to colonize living gastropods as well. The sponge begins as a thin crust and continues to grow around the shell until the shell is engulfed entirely. Often these shells are inhabited by hermit crabs. A hermit crab using the gastropod shell as shelter continues to live in the shell as it is covered by the sponge. As the shell becomes engulfed, the hermit crab inside relocates to a chamber within the sponge itself. This chamber conforms to fit the spiral-shape of the hermit crab's abdomen and grows with the crab as needed, and the hermit crab shapes and maintains an opening to continue to move about and function normally. Only certain hermit crab species use sponge shelters. Pagurus impressus and Paguristes hummi are the most frequently occurring occupants.

This arrangement is believed to be mutually beneficial. The sponge gains access to sand and mud bottomed habitats where other sponges could not survive. The sponge gains increased feeding opportunities and better-oxygenated water due to the feeding activities of the crustacean, and there is also a decreased chance of the sponge being buried in sediment. The hermit crab gets a home which grows in size, so the hermit crab does not need to hunt to find larger empty gastropod shells. The hermit crab may also benefit from the unpalatability of the sponge and camouflage the sponge provides.
