= A. robustus =

A. robustus may refer to:

- Aaptos robustus, a sea sponge
- Acanthodactylus robustus, a lizard endemic to the Middle East
- Actinopus robustus, a Panamanian spider
- Aepycamelus robustus, a prehistoric camelid
- Alloophorus robustus, the bulldog goodeid, a fish species
- "Allosaurus robustus", an informal name for a theropod known only from a single bone
- Amblysomus robustus, the robust golden mole, a mammal species endemic to South Africa
- Anaeromyces robustus, a fungus that lives in the gut of ruminant herbivores
- Anhanguera robustus, a prehistoric pterosaur
- Aradus robustus, a North American flat bug
- Aspergillus robustus, a mold fungus
- Ataenius robustus, the saline prairie scarab beetle, a North American dung beetle
- Atrax robustus, the Sydney funnel-web spider, a notoriously dangerous funnel-web spider species found within a 100 km (62 mi) radius of Sydney, New South Wales, Australia

== Synonyms ==
- Acteniopsis robustus, a synonym for Stemmatophora robustus, a snout moth known from the United Arab Emirates
- Apogon robustus, a synonym for Ostorhinchus cookii, a fish found in the Indian and Pacific Oceans
- Astylosternus robustus, a synonym for Trichobatrachus robustus, the hairy frog, native to Central Africa
- Australopithecus robustus, a synonym for Paranthropus robustus, an extinct hominin species dated to have lived between 2.0 and 1.2 million years ago
