= Aaptos vannamei =

Scientific classification
- Kingdom: Animalia
- Phylum: Porifera
- Class: Demospongiae
- Order: Suberitida
- Family: Suberitidae
- Genus: Aaptos
- Species: A. vannamei

Binomial name
- Aaptos vannamei de Laubenfels, 1935

Species of sponge

Aaptos vannamei is a species of sea sponge belonging to the family Suberitidae. The species was described in 1935.
