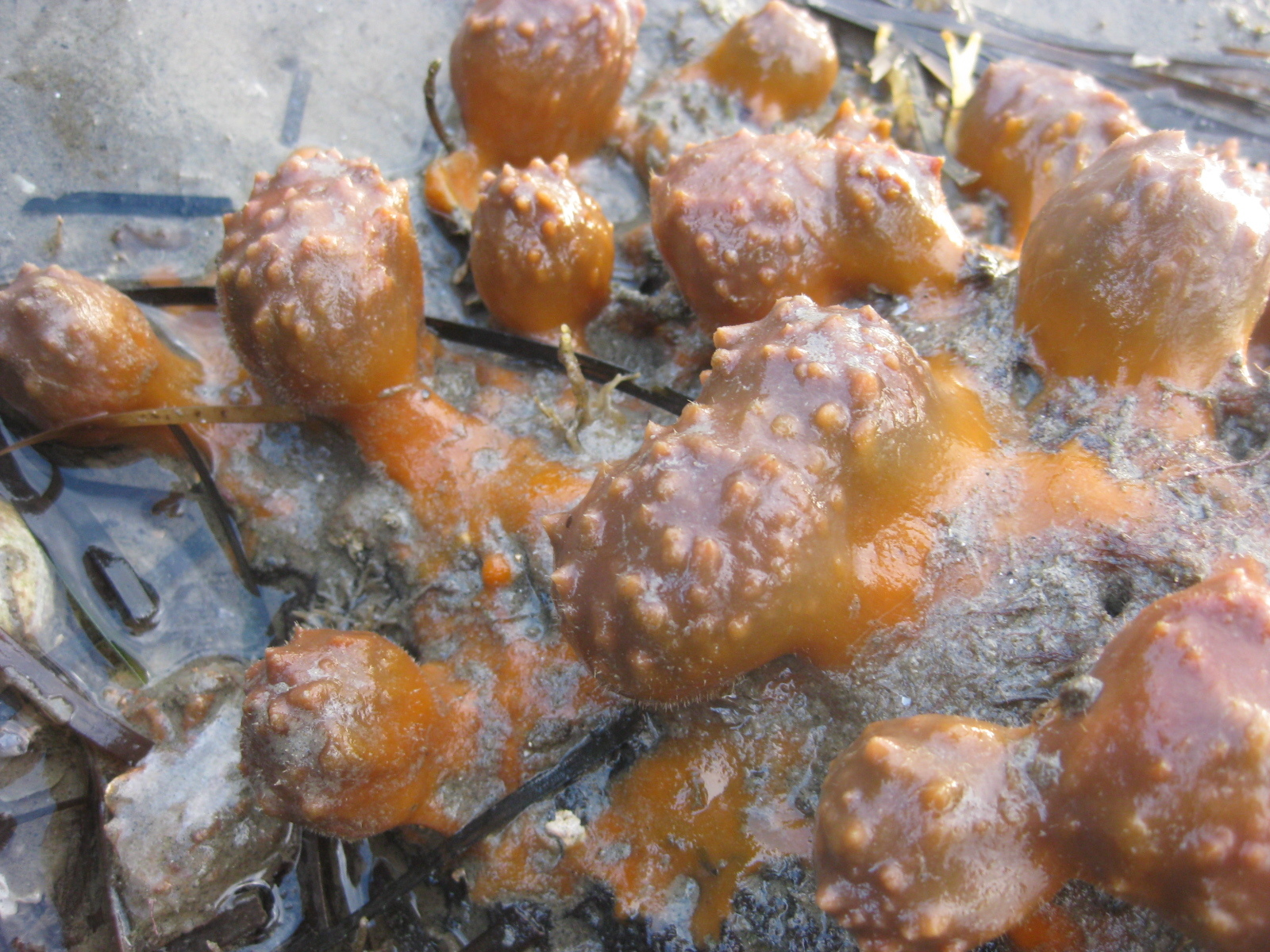
- Aaptos tenta

Scientific classification
- Kingdom: Animalia
- Phylum: Porifera
- Class: Demospongiae
- Order: Suberitida
- Family: Suberitidae
- Genus: Aaptos; Gray, 1867

Synonyms
- List: Tethyophaena Schmidt, 1880; Trachya Carter, 1870; Tuberella Keller, 1880

= Aaptos =

Genus of sponges

Aaptos is a genus of sea sponges in the family Suberitidae.

It was first described by John Edward Gray in 1867.

== Species ==
The following species are recognised in the genus Aaptos:

- Aaptos aaptos (Schmidt, 1864)
- Aaptos alphiensis Samaai & Gibbons, 2005
- Aaptos bergmanni de Laubenfels, 1950
- Aaptos ciliata (Wilson, 1925)
- Aaptos conferta Kelly-Borges & Bergquist, 1994
- Aaptos duchassaingi (Topsent, 1889)
- Aaptos durissima (Carter, 1882)
- Aaptos globosa Kelly-Borges & Bergquist, 1994
- Aaptos glutinans Moraes, 2011
- Aaptos hajdui Carvalho, da Silva & Pinheiro, 2013
- Aaptos horrida (Carter, 1886)
- Aaptos kanuux Lehnert, Hocevar & Stone, 2008
- Aaptos laxosuberites (Sollas, 1902)
- Aaptos lobata Calcinai, Bastari, Bertolino & Pansini, 2017
- Aaptos niger Hoshino, 1981
- Aaptos nuda (Kirkpatrick, 1903)
- Aaptos papillata (Keller, 1880)
- Aaptos pernucleata (Carter, 1870)
- Aaptos potiguarensis Carvalho, da Silva & Pinheiro, 2013
- Aaptos robustus Plotkin & Janussen, 2008
- Aaptos rosacea Kelly-Borges & Bergquist, 1994
- Aaptos suberitoides (Brøndsted, 1934)
- Aaptos tenta Kelly-Borges & Bergquist, 1994
- Aaptos vannamei de Laubenfels, 1935
