= Aaptos durissima =

Scientific classification
- Kingdom: Animalia
- Phylum: Porifera
- Class: Demospongiae
- Order: Suberitida
- Family: Suberitidae
- Genus: Aaptos
- Species: A. durissima

Binomial name
- Aaptos durissima (Carter, 1882)

Synonyms
- Trachya durissima Carter, 1882

Species of sponge

Aaptos durissima is a species of sea sponge belonging to the family Suberitidae. The species was described in 1882.
