= Aaptos bergmanni =

Scientific classification
- Kingdom: Animalia
- Phylum: Porifera
- Class: Demospongiae
- Order: Suberitida
- Family: Suberitidae
- Genus: Aaptos
- Species: A. bergmanni

Binomial name
- Aaptos bergmanni de Laubenfels, 1950

Species of sponge

Aaptos bergmanni is a species of sea sponge belonging to the family Suberitidae. The species was described in 1950 by de Laubenfels.
