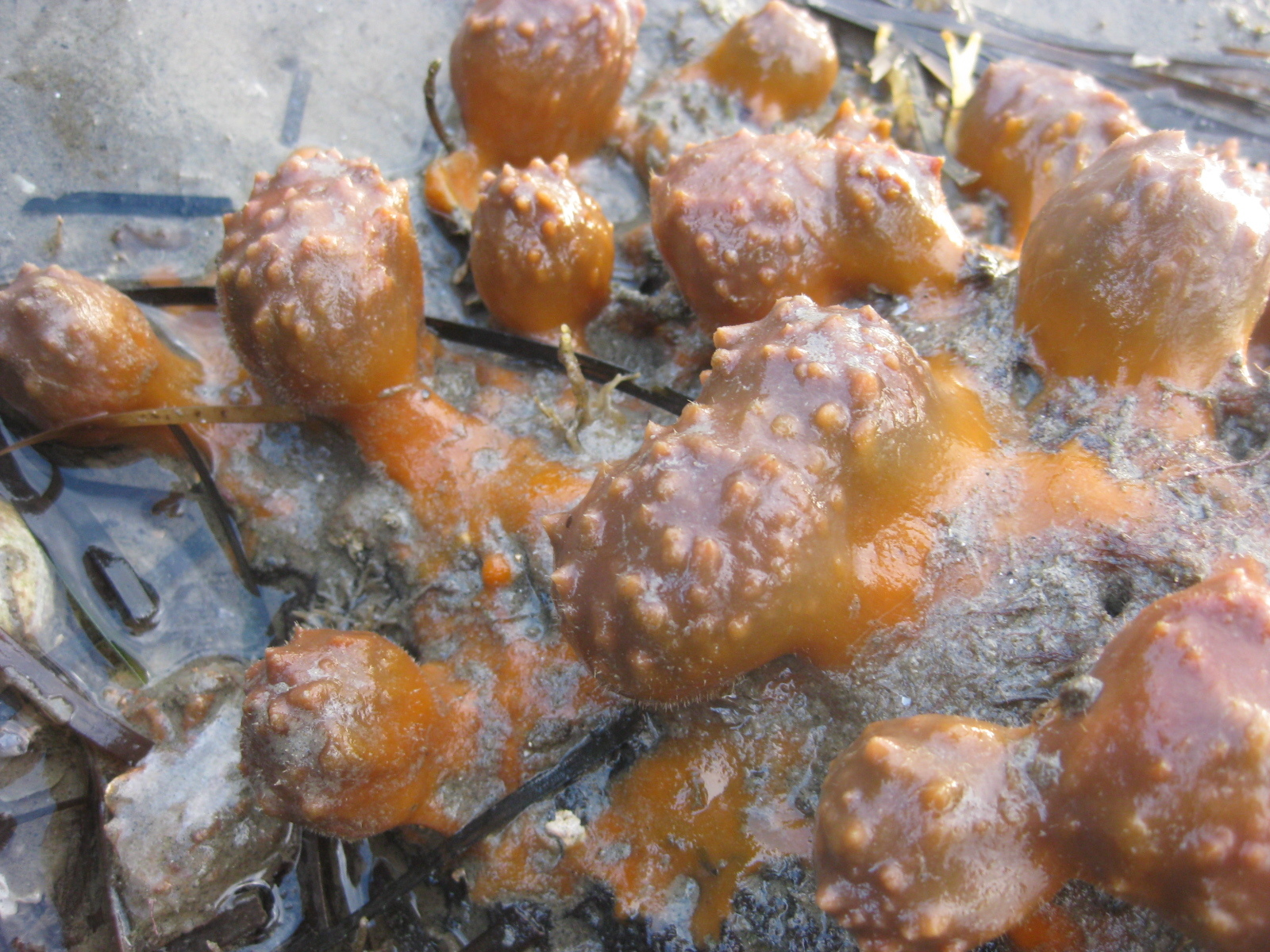

Scientific classification
- Domain: Eukaryota
- Kingdom: Animalia
- Phylum: Porifera
- Class: Demospongiae
- Order: Suberitida
- Family: Suberitidae
- Genus: Aaptos
- Species: A. tenta

Binomial name
- Aaptos tenta Kelly-Borges & Bergquist, 1994

= Aaptos tenta =

Species of sponge

Aaptos tenta is a species of sea sponge belonging to the family Suberitidae. The species was described in 1994 by Michelle Kelly-Borges and Patricia Bergquist.

It has been found in waters off the North Island of New Zealand.
