= Terpios hoshinota =

Scientific classification
- Kingdom: Animalia
- Phylum: Porifera
- Class: Demospongiae
- Order: Suberitida
- Family: Suberitidae
- Genus: Terpios
- Species: T. hoshinota

Binomial name
- Terpios hoshinota Rützler & Muzik, 1993

Species of sponge

Terpios hoshinota is a species of sea sponge belonging to the family Suberitidae. It is found on rocky shores in the Indo-Pacific region. This sponge forms blackish sheets which overgrow and kill corals, and is the causal agent for the so-called "black disease" of corals. Since being discovered in Guam in 1973, this sponge has been spreading to other areas of the Indo-Pacific region and threatening coral reefs from the Maldives to the South China Sea and eastern Australia.

== History ==
In the 1970s and 1980s, sponges were increasingly being observed as competitors to corals on reefs in the central western Pacific, but were not considered to be a particular threat until an encrusting species in the genus Terpios was observed in increasing quantities on Guam in 1973. The same species, not previously known to science, was recorded in 1987 from the western Caroline Islands and the northern Mariana Islands, and also found in the Philippines, Taiwan and American Samoa. The new species was first described in 1993 by the US marine zoologists Klaus Rützler and Katherine Muzik, and given the name Terpios hoshinota. The name honours the sponge systematist Takaharu Hoshinota. The overgrowing of corals by a blackish mat led to the name "black disease" being given to the phenomenon.

Corals in the reefs north of Yongxing Island in the South China Sea were flourishing before 2002, but by 2008, had suffered high coral mortality, many living and dead corals being covered by a mat of blackish material, which has since been identified as T. hoshinota. Although there are a number of possible causes of the coral mortality, such as bleaching and crown-of-thorns starfish (Acanthaster planci), black disease seems to be the culprit at Yongxing Island, with identifiable T. hoshinota spicules being found associated with long dead corals.

In 2010, Terpios hoshinota was found on reefs around Lizard Island growing on Acropora corals, the first record of this sponge from the Great Barrier Reef. In 2011 and 2012, survey in Indonesia detected this sponge in a few isolated locations in southwestern Sulawesi, but it was present in a large outbreak around Thousand Islands (Indonesia), Java, in an area where the coral reefs were already stressed and in a relatively poor state. In 2015, the sponge was reported from many locations in Indonesia, and also from the Maldive Islands, the first report of it from the Indian Ocean.

== Description ==
Terpios hoshinota is a thinly encrusting species, forming sheets 1 mm (0.04 in) thick on dead or living corals. As the sheet spreads, it can bridge gaps between lobes and branches of coral, killing the coral polyps over which it grows. The sponge spicules are all tylostyles, and are pin-shaped with lobed heads. The sponge tissue contains large, unicellular cyanobacteria in symbiosis; sometimes these form as much as 50% of the weight of the sponge. The living sponge is generally grey, blackish or dark brown.

== Ecology ==
It was at first thought that the sponge might be obtaining nourishment from the coral tissues over which it grows. Research however shows that it grows fastest on clean (air-blasted) coral, and more slowly on living coral, bare rock and coralline algae in that order. Corals such as Montipora and Porites, and coralline algae, can also overgrow the sponge. In general, the sponge thrives on polluted and stressed coral reefs.
