= Aaptos suberitoides =

Scientific classification
- Domain: Eukaryota
- Kingdom: Animalia
- Phylum: Porifera
- Class: Demospongiae
- Order: Suberitida
- Family: Suberitidae
- Genus: Aaptos
- Species: A. suberitoides

Binomial name
- Aaptos suberitoides (Brøndsted, 1934)

Synonyms
- List: Aaptos aaptos var. nigra Lévi, 1961; Aaptos chromis de Laubenfels, 1954; Stylotella suberitoides Brøndsted, 1934

Species of sponge

Aaptos suberitoides is a species of sea sponge belonging to the family Suberitidae. The species was described in 1934.
