= Aaptos pernucleata =

Scientific classification
- Kingdom: Animalia
- Phylum: Porifera
- Class: Demospongiae
- Order: Suberitida
- Family: Suberitidae
- Genus: Aaptos
- Species: A. pernucleata

Binomial name
- Aaptos pernucleata (Carter, 1870)

Synonyms
- List: Aaptos lithophaga (Wiedenmayer, 1977); Amorphinopsis spongia (de Laubenfels, 1953); Axinyssa lithophaga (Wiedenmayer, 1977); Epipolasis angulospiculata sensu Laubenfels, 1936; Epipolasis lithophaga Wiedenmayer, 1977; Prostylissa spongia de Laubenfels, 1953; Trachya pernucleata Carter, 1870

Species of sponge

Aaptos pernucleata is a species of sea sponge belonging to the family Suberitidae. The species was described in 1870.
