= Aaptos kanuux =

Scientific classification
- Domain: Eukaryota
- Kingdom: Animalia
- Phylum: Porifera
- Class: Demospongiae
- Order: Suberitida
- Family: Suberitidae
- Genus: Aaptos
- Species: A. kanuux

Binomial name
- Aaptos kanuux Lehnert, Hocevar & Stone, 2008

Species of sponge

Aaptos kanuux is a species of sea sponge belonging to the family Suberitidae. It is named after the Unangan/Aleutian word for heart.

== Discovery ==
Greenpeace announced the discovery on April 28, 2008. It was discovered in the summer of 2007 while investigating deep sea canyons of the Bering Sea. Kenneth Lowyck discovered the new species while exploring the bottom of the canyon in a DeepWorker 2000 DSV. George Pletnikoff, Greenpeace Alaska Ocean's Campaigner and an Aleut/Unangan from St. George Island was given the honor of naming the sponge and subsequently chose the Aleut/Unangan word for heart.
