= Homaxinella =

Scientific classification
- Kingdom: Animalia
- Phylum: Porifera
- Class: Demospongiae
- Order: Suberitida
- Family: Suberitidae
- Genus: Homaxinella; Topsent, 1916

Species
- See text

Synonyms
- Pachaxinella Burton, 1930

Genus of sponges

Homaxinella is a genus of sea sponges in the family Suberitidae. The type species is Homaxinella balfourensis.

== Description ==
Homaxinella was originally included in the sponge family Axinellidae but the structure of the skeleton shows that it lacks a reticulation and has bundles of calcareous spicules at the surface which led to its inclusion in Suberitidae. The members of the genus are rooted to the substrate and have stalks, a much branched habit of growth and an axially condensed choanosomal skeleton. They have an extra-axial skeleton of bundles of megascleres which are exclusively styles, and a profusion of further incoherently arranged styles, in a wide range of sizes. There are no microscleres.

== Species ==
The World Porifera Database recognises the following species:

- Homaxinella amphispicula (de Laubenfels, 1961)
- Homaxinella balfourensis (Ridley & Dendy, 1886)
- Homaxinella brevistyla Hoshino, 1981
- Homaxinella ensifera (Lamarck, 1815)
- Homaxinella erecta (Brøndsted, 1924)
- Homaxinella flagelliformis (Ridley & Dendy, 1886)
- Homaxinella infundibula Tanita & Hoshino, 1989
- Homaxinella ramosimassa Tanita & Hoshino, 1989
- Homaxinella subdola (Bowerbank, 1866)
- Homaxinella tanitai Hoshino, 1981
