= Aaptos conferta =

Scientific classification
- Domain: Eukaryota
- Kingdom: Animalia
- Phylum: Porifera
- Class: Demospongiae
- Order: Suberitida
- Family: Suberitidae
- Genus: Aaptos
- Species: A. conferta

Binomial name
- Aaptos conferta Kelly-Borges & Bergquist, 1994

Species of sponge

Aaptos conferta is a species of sea sponge belonging to the family Suberitidae and is found in New Zealand. The species was described in 1994 by Michelle Kelly-Borges & Patricia Bergquist.

It is found in waters off the North Island of New Zealand.
