= Aaptos glutinans =

Scientific classification
- Kingdom: Animalia
- Phylum: Porifera
- Class: Demospongiae
- Order: Suberitida
- Family: Suberitidae
- Genus: Aaptos
- Species: A. glutinans

Binomial name
- Aaptos glutinans Moraes, 2011

Species of sponge

Aaptos glutinans is a species of sea sponge belonging to the family Suberitidae. The species was described in 2011. It was found in the localities of Fernando de Noronha and Atoll das Rocas (Piscina das Âncoras, Rocas Atoll) Rio Grande do Norte, Brazil.
