= Aaptos alphiensis =

Scientific classification
- Domain: Eukaryota
- Kingdom: Animalia
- Phylum: Porifera
- Class: Demospongiae
- Order: Suberitida
- Family: Suberitidae
- Genus: Aaptos
- Species: A. alphiensis

Binomial name
- Aaptos alphiensis Samaai & Gibbons, 2005

Species of sponge

Aaptos alphiensis is a species of sea sponge belonging to the family Suberitidae. The species was described in 2005 by Samaai & Gibbons.
