= Aaptos duchassaingi =

Scientific classification
- Kingdom: Animalia
- Phylum: Porifera
- Class: Demospongiae
- Order: Suberitida
- Family: Suberitidae
- Genus: Aaptos
- Species: A. duchassaingi

Binomial name
- Aaptos duchassaingi (Topsent, 1889)

Synonyms
- Amorphina duchassaingi Topsent, 1889

Species of sponge

Aaptos duchassaingi is a species of sea sponge belonging to the family Suberitidae. The species was described in 1889.
