= Caulospongia elegans =

Scientific classification
- Kingdom: Animalia
- Phylum: Porifera
- Class: Demospongiae
- Order: Suberitida
- Family: Suberitidae
- Genus: Caulospongia
- Species: C. elegans

Binomial name
- Caulospongia elegans (Lendenfeld 1888)

Synonyms
- Plectodendron elegans Lendenfeld, 1888

Species of sponge

Caulospongia elegans is a species of sea sponge belonging to the family Suberitidae. It is found in Australia.
