= Aaptos laxosuberites =

Scientific classification
- Kingdom: Animalia
- Phylum: Porifera
- Class: Demospongiae
- Order: Suberitida
- Family: Suberitidae
- Genus: Aaptos
- Species: A. laxosuberites

Binomial name
- Aaptos laxosuberites (Sollas, 1902)

Synonyms
- Suberites laxosuberites Sollas, 1902

Species of sponge

Aaptos laxosuberites is a species of sea sponge belonging to the family Suberitidae. The species was described in 1902.
