= Caulospongia amplexa =

Scientific classification
- Domain: Eukaryota
- Kingdom: Animalia
- Phylum: Porifera
- Class: Demospongiae
- Order: Suberitida
- Family: Suberitidae
- Genus: Caulospongia
- Species: C. amplexa

Binomial name
- Caulospongia amplexa Fromont, 1998

Species of sponge

Type sites'"`UNIQ--ref-00000008-QINU`"'

Caulospongia amplexa is a species of sea sponge belonging to the family Suberitidae.

It was first described by Jane Fromont in 1998, with type specimens from Rosemary Island, Dampier Archipelago, Western Australia, Goss Passage off Beacon Island, from Serventy Island, Easter Group, Abrolhos Islands, and north of Boulder Cliff, Dorre Island, Western Australia.

== Description ==
Caulospongia amplexa sponges have even lobes (0.2-0.3 cm thick) which consist of a single whorl around the central hollow stem. The lobes slope downwards at the outer edge. The lobes are widest in the central part of the sponge, narrowing towards both the base and the apex. The undersurface of the lobes is finely porous. The sponge is 20-42 cm high, with the stem below lobes being 8-11 cm long, and the lobes 13-31 cm x 4-5 cm wide at the widest point of the sponge. Colours of the type specimens varied from salmon to orange pink, yellow and yellowish-brown.
