= Aaptos niger =

Scientific classification
- Domain: Eukaryota
- Kingdom: Animalia
- Phylum: Porifera
- Class: Demospongiae
- Order: Suberitida
- Family: Suberitidae
- Genus: Aaptos
- Species: A. niger

Binomial name
- Aaptos niger Hoshino, 1981

Species of sponge

Aaptos niger is a species of sea sponge belonging to the family Suberitidae. The species was described in 1981.
