= Caulospongia biflabellata =

Scientific classification
- Domain: Eukaryota
- Kingdom: Animalia
- Phylum: Porifera
- Class: Demospongiae
- Order: Suberitida
- Family: Suberitidae
- Genus: Caulospongia
- Species: C. biflabellata

Binomial name
- Caulospongia biflabellata Fromont, 1998

Species of sponge

Holotype site'"`UNIQ--ref-00000006-QINU`"'

Caulospongia biflabellata, commonly known as the western staircase sponge, is a species of sea sponge belonging to the family Suberitidae. It is a marine sponge of the temperate waters of Australia (Northwest Cape to Albany, WA).

It was first described by Jane Fromont in 1998, from a specimen collected from Limestone reef flat, Cheyne Beach, Western Australia
