= Aaptos nuda =

Scientific classification
- Domain: Eukaryota
- Kingdom: Animalia
- Phylum: Porifera
- Class: Demospongiae
- Order: Suberitida
- Family: Suberitidae
- Genus: Aaptos
- Species: A. nuda

Binomial name
- Aaptos nuda (Kirkpatrick, 1903)

Synonyms
- Trachya nuda Kirkpatrick, 1903

Species of sponge

Aaptos nuda is a species of sea sponge belonging to the family Suberitidae. It is native to South Africa. The species was described by Randolph Kirkpatrick in 1903.
