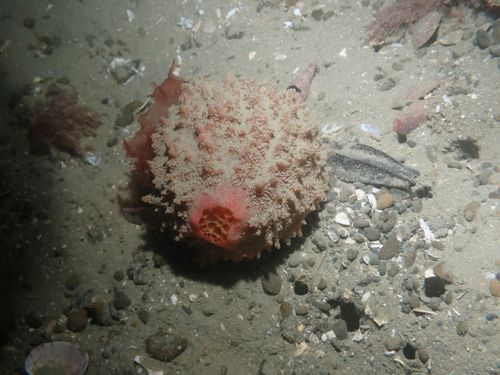
- (photo: Luca Davenport-Thomas)

Scientific classification
- Domain: Eukaryota
- Kingdom: Animalia
- Phylum: Porifera
- Class: Demospongiae
- Order: Suberitida
- Family: Suberitidae
- Genus: Aaptos
- Species: A. globosa

Binomial name
- Aaptos globosa Kelly-Borges & Bergquist, 1994

= Aaptos globosa =

Species of sponge

Aaptos globosa is a species of sea sponge belonging to the family Suberitidae. The species was described in 1994 by Michelle Kelly-Borges & Patricia Bergquist.

This sponge has been observed in the waters off the North Island of New Zealand.
