= Terpios fugax =

Scientific classification
- Kingdom: Animalia
- Phylum: Porifera
- Class: Demospongiae
- Order: Suberitida
- Family: Suberitidae
- Genus: Terpios
- Species: T. fugax

Binomial name
- Terpios fugax Duchassaing & Michelotti, 1864

Synonyms
- List: Prosuberites microsclerus Laubenfels, 1936; Suberites fugax (Duchassaing & Michelotti, 1864)

Species of sponge

Terpios fugax is a species of sea sponge belonging to the family Suberitidae. It is found on rocky shores on both sides of the North Atlantic. This species forms small, thin patches on rocks and would be inconspicuous if it weren't for its colour, a startlingly vivid blue.
