= Aaptos papillata =

Scientific classification
- Kingdom: Animalia
- Phylum: Porifera
- Class: Demospongiae
- Order: Suberitida
- Family: Suberitidae
- Genus: Aaptos
- Species: A. papillata

Binomial name
- Aaptos papillata (Keller, 1880)

Synonyms
- List: Polymastia gleneni Descatoire, 1966; Tethyophaena silifica Schmidt, 1880; Tuberella papillata Keller, 1880

Species of sponge

Aaptos papillata is a species of sea sponge belonging to the family Suberitidae. This species was first described in 1880. It is native to the northeastern Atlantic Ocean, the English Channel and the Mediterranean Sea.

== Description ==
Aaptos papillata is a massive sponge growing in a domed shape, the smooth velvety surface being densely covered in small, low nipples. The oscula through which water exits are small and few in number. The colour of this sponge is pink flushed with purple, the nipples being paler. The interior is creamy-pink in the middle and yellowish-ochre near the surface, which is often obscured by sand and shell fragments. The consistency is firm but elastic.

== Biology ==
Like most species of sponge, Aaptos papillata is a filter feeder. Water passes in through pores, food particles are filtered out and the water passes out through the oscula. It feeds on bacteria and small planktonic particles not exceeding three microns in diameter. Its means of reproduction have not been studied but it is likely to be similar to other members of its family. Sponges are generally hermaphrodite; sexual reproduction is by the release of gametes into the water column; asexual reproduction may be by budding, or by detachment of fragments of sponge.
