= Aaptos robustus =

Scientific classification
- Kingdom: Animalia
- Phylum: Porifera
- Class: Demospongiae
- Order: Suberitida
- Family: Suberitidae
- Genus: Aaptos
- Species: A. robustus

Binomial name
- Aaptos robustus Plotkin & Janussen, 2008

Species of sponge

Aaptos robustus is a species of sea sponge belonging to the family Suberitidae. The species was described in 2008.
