= Rhizaxinella =

Scientific classification
- Domain: Eukaryota
- Kingdom: Animalia
- Phylum: Porifera
- Class: Demospongiae
- Order: Suberitida
- Family: Suberitidae
- Genus: Rhizaxinella; Keller, 1880

Genus of sponges

Rhizaxinella is a genus of sponges belonging to the family Suberitidae.

The genus has almost cosmopolitan distribution.

Species:

- Rhizaxinella arborescens Thiele, 1898
- Rhizaxinella australiensis Hentschel, 1909
- Rhizaxinella biseta Topsent, 1904
