= Aaptos horrida =

Scientific classification
- Kingdom: Animalia
- Phylum: Porifera
- Class: Demospongiae
- Order: Suberitida
- Family: Suberitidae
- Genus: Aaptos
- Species: A. horrida

Binomial name
- Aaptos horrida (Carter, 1886)

Synonyms
- Trachya horrida Carter, 1886

Species of sponge

Aaptos horrida is a species of sea sponge belonging to the family Suberitidae. The species was described in 1886.
