= A. rosacea =

A. rosacea may refer to:

- Aaptos rosacea, a sea sponge
- Acrojana rosacea, a Ghanaian moth
- Astyris rosacea, the rosy northern dovesnail, a sea snail species
- Asura rosacea, a New Guinean moth
