= A. lobata =

A. lobata may refer to:

- Aaptos lobata, a sea sponge
- Abraxas lobata, a synonym of Abraxas capitata, an Indian moth
- Acompomintho lobata, a blowfly
- Aedia lobata, a synonym of Catephia lobata, an Indonesian moth
- Arachnorchis lobata, a synonym of Caladenia lobata, commonly known as the butterfly orchid, a West Australian plant
- Argiope lobata, an orb-weaver spider found in Africa, southern Europe, and Asia
- Argyrotaenia lobata, a Bolivian moth
- Arrhenia lobata, an agaric fungus
- Aspidimorpha lobata, an Asian leaf beetle
- Astraea lobata, a plant native to the Americas
