= A. horrida =

A. horrida may refer to:

- Aaptos horrida, a sea sponge
- Acacia horrida, a synonym of Vachellia horrida, an East African plant
- Aciphylla horrida, a New Zealand speargrass
- Acropora horrida, a coral
- Acanthopholis horrida, a prehistoric ankylosaur
- Aiphanes horrida, a South American palm tree
