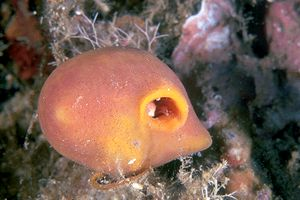

Scientific classification
- Kingdom: Animalia
- Phylum: Porifera
- Class: Demospongiae
- Order: Suberitida
- Family: Suberitidae
- Genus: Suberites
- Species: S. domuncula

Binomial name
- Suberites domuncula (Olivi, 1792)

Synonyms
- List: Alcyonium bulbosum Esper, 1794; Alcyonium compactum Lamarck, 1815; Alcyonium domuncula Olivi, 1792; Litamena spugnosa Renier, 1828; Suberites compactus Balsamo Crivelli, 1863

= Suberites domuncula =

Species of sponge

Suberites domuncula is a species of sea sponge belonging to the family Suberitidae.

This species contains suberitine, a neurotoxin that can cause fatal hemolytic hemorrhaging in various animals. While it is highly toxic to fish, it is known to be preyed upon by the hawksbill turtle, Eretmochelys imbricata.

There are currently two accepted subspecies of this taxon: Suberites domuncula domuncula and S. domuncula latus. In 1893, Lambe described a new sponge species as Suberites latus. This was later determined to be a junior synonym of S. domuncula and merged into the species as a subspecies under the scientific name S. domuncula latus.

S. domuncula is well known for colonizing gastropod shells occupied by hermit crabs. At least 13 species of hermit crabs have been found associated with this sponge. It has also been recorded attached to the shells of live gastropods and the carapace of other crustaceans.

== Anatomy and Physiology ==
The body plan of this species consists of a skeleton mainly made up of spicules. Monactinal tylosyles and a small fraction of diactinal oxeas make up the megascleres found in the skeleton of S. domuncula. S. domuncula contain a visible osculum where water exits the body.

=== Spicule Formation ===
The spicules are made up of silicatein. Silicatein is an enzyme that catalyzes polymerized silicon. Suberites domuncula also use the enzyme silicase to metabolize siliceous spicules. Spicules of the S. domuncula species can grow to 450 𝜇m in length and 5-7 𝜇m in diameter. The spicules grow through apposition of lamellar silica layers. An axial canal of 0.3-1.6 𝜇m width can be found in all spicules, while lamellated layers of 0.3-1 𝜇m thickness enclose the central canal. Silicatein can be found on the surface of the spicules and in the axial filament of the spicules.

In Demospongiae, microfibrils make up a collagenous ‘cement’ that holds the spicules together.

== Ecology ==
Sponges are found in a variety of different marine benthic environments due to its early existence in evolution. It is commonly found in sandy and muddy habitats.

Many species of hermit crabs can be found within the Suberites domuncula sponge in the Mediterranean Sea. S. domuncula tend to grow on/within gastropod shells. When hermit crabs find a habitat within this sponge, if unfavorable conditions are encountered the sponge will then form gemmules on the outside of the shell.

Sponges are known to hold mutualistic bacteria in their mesohyl. S. domuncula produce a bacterial quorum sensing molecule, N-3-oxo-dodecanoyl-L-homoserine lactone, that limits the host immune and apoptotic responses. This leads to an increase in phagocytosis-related genes. S. domuncula have the ability to differentiate a symbiotic bacterium from others.

=== Feeding ===
These sponges act as filter-feeders, driving a large amount of water through a highly vascularized canal system. Bacteria taken from the water column are phagocytized in order to retrieve nutrients.

=== Lifestyle ===
Suberites domuncula experience a typical life style of the class Demospongiae. This species is made up of archeocytes and choanocytes, which act as the stem cells to the sponge.

== Reproduction ==
Suberites domuncula are able to reproduce both sexually and asexually. They reproduce asexually through gemmules made up of archeocytes that are enclosed by a collagenous coat. Gemmules still survive upon the death of the sponge, persisting in harsh conditions for prolonged periods of time. Gemmules hatch once conditions are right and develop into juvenile sponges over the course of a few weeks. Sexual reproduction involves the release of free-swimming larvae which then develop into juvenile sponge.

== Development ==
Suberites domuncula have a Brachyury gene that is associated with the formation of the limbs. This gene has an increased expression when canal-like structures are being formed in the sponge. The formation of a primordial axis is genetically fixed in sponges.

This species also exhibits Wnt signaling, which is responsible for cell communication, specifically cell-fate decisions, tissue polarity, and morphogenesis. S. domuncula also holds the scaffold protein membrane-associated guanylate kinase which encodes a tight junction scaffold protein. A tetraspan receptor can also be found in S. domuncula.

== Distinguishing features ==
=== Primmorphs ===
Dissociated single cells from Suberites domuncula form multicellular aggregates, known as primmorphs. These primmorphs are organized into a unicellular epithelium-like layer consisting of pinacocytes and spherulous cells.

In the S. domuncula species, primmorphs exhibit rapid spicule formation. Spicules initially form intracellularly in the sclerocytes.

Primmorphs present regenerative abilities through the activity of proliferating cells.

Sponges are shown to express a myotrophin-related molecule that aligns with the vertebrate cardiac myotropin.

=== Defense Mechanisms ===
Suberites domuncula exhibits strong antimicrobial activity. These sea sponges have the ability to produce suberitine, a neurotoxin that results in hemolytic and toxic abilities. Sponges are found to interact with bacteria on a normal basis. The bacteria found on sponges is responsible for the production of antibacterial metabolites.

These sponges maintain a direct defense strategy through the production of antibacterial compounds that prevent epibiosis.

Indirect defense is achieved through the maintenance of antimicrobially active bacteria on the surface.

S. domuncula have the ability to produce a perforin-like antibacterial protein.
