= A. papillata =

A. papillata may refer to:

- Aaptos papillata, a sea sponge native to the northeastern Atlantic Ocean, the English Channel and the Mediterranean Sea
- Ascuris papillata, a synonym of Arturia canariensis, a sea sponge native to the Canary Islands, Cape Verde, the Adriatic Sea and the Caribbean Sea
