= Terpios =

Scientific classification
- Kingdom: Animalia
- Phylum: Porifera
- Class: Demospongiae
- Order: Suberitida
- Family: Suberitidae
- Genus: Terpios; Duchassaing & Michelotti, 1864

Species
- See text

Genus of sponges

Terpios is a genus of sea sponges belonging to the family Suberitidae.

== Species ==
- Terpios aploos de Laubenfels, 1954
- Terpios australiensis Hentschel, 1909
- Terpios belindae Rützler & Smith, 1993
- Terpios cruciata (Dendy, 1905)
- Terpios fugax Duchassaing & Michelotti, 1864
- Terpios gelatinosa (Bowerbank, 1866)
- Terpios granulosa Bergquist, 1967
- Terpios hoshinota Rützler & Muzik, 1993
- Terpios lendenfeldi Keller, 1891
- Terpios manglaris Rützler & Smith, 1993
- Terpios quiza (de Laubenfels, 1954)
- Terpios vestigium (Carter, 1880)
- Terpios viridis Keller, 1891
