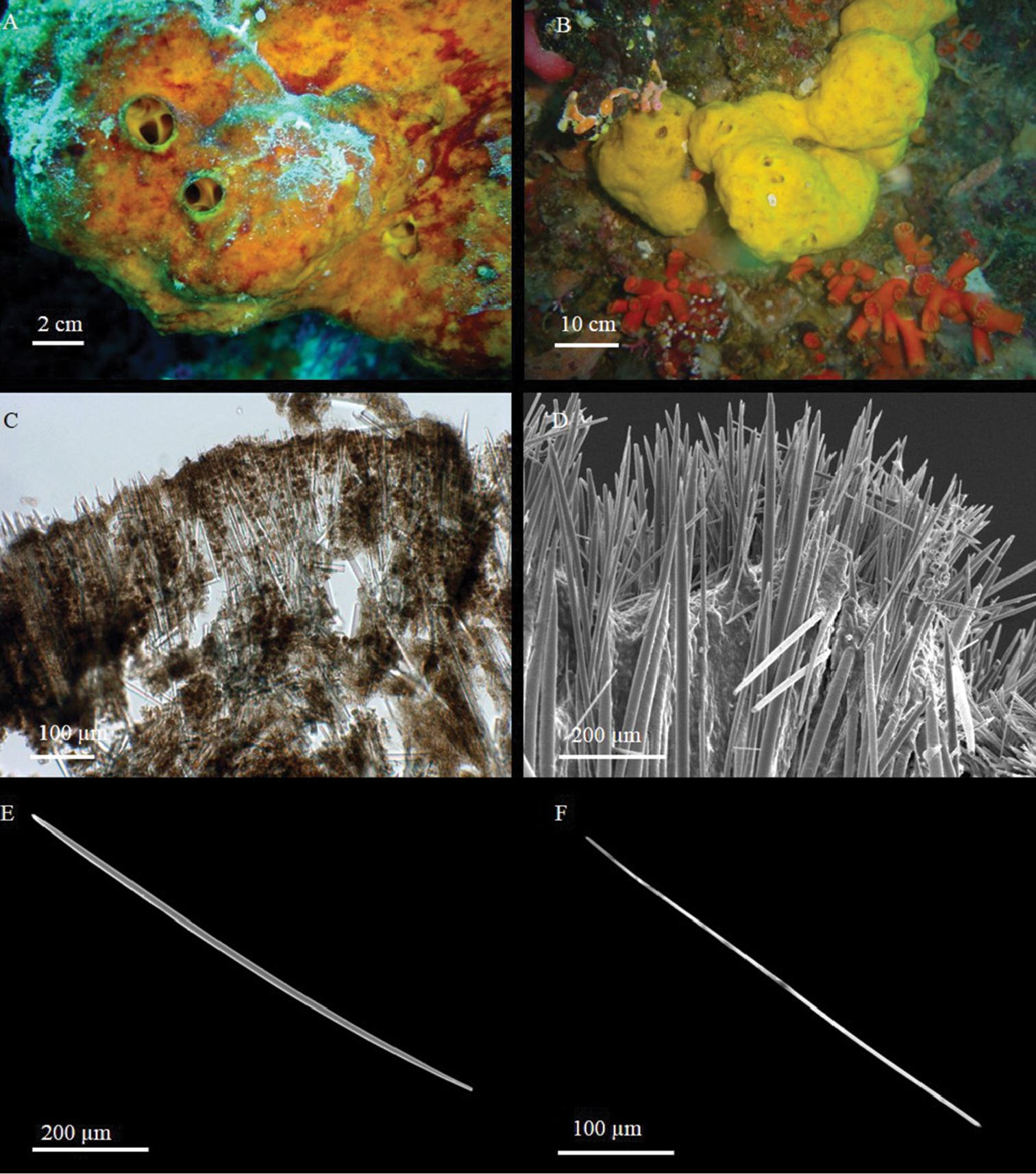
- A holotype B paratype C skeleton organisation (transverse section) D peripherical part of the skeleton E large strongyloxea F thin style

Scientific classification
- Kingdom: Animalia
- Phylum: Porifera
- Class: Demospongiae
- Order: Suberitida
- Family: Suberitidae
- Genus: Aaptos
- Species: A. lobata

Binomial name
- Aaptos lobata Calcinai, Bastari, Bertolino & Pansini, 2017

= Aaptos lobata =

Species of sponge

Aaptos lobata is a species of sea sponge belonging to the family Suberitidae. The species was described in 2017. The holotype was collected in the Makassar Strait.
