= Aaptos ciliata =

Scientific classification
- Domain: Eukaryota
- Kingdom: Animalia
- Phylum: Porifera
- Class: Demospongiae
- Order: Suberitida
- Family: Suberitidae
- Genus: Aaptos
- Species: A. ciliata

Binomial name
- Aaptos ciliata (Wilson, 1925)

Synonyms
- Tuberella ciliata Wilson, 1925

Species of sponge

Aaptos ciliata is a species of sea sponge belonging to the family Suberitidae. The species was described in 1925.
