= Caulospongia =

Scientific classification
- Domain: Eukaryota
- Kingdom: Animalia
- Phylum: Porifera
- Class: Demospongiae
- Order: Suberitida
- Family: Suberitidae
- Genus: Caulospongia; Kent 1871

Species
- See text

Synonyms
- Plectodendron Lendenfeld, 1888

Genus of sponges

Caulospongia is a genus of sea sponges belonging to the family Suberitidae.

== Species ==
The following species are recognised in the genus Caulospongia:

- Caulospongia amplexa Fromont, 1998
- Caulospongia biflabellata Fromont, 1998
- Caulospongia elegans (Lendenfeld 1888)
- Caulospongia pennatula (Lamarck 1814)
- Caulospongia perfoliata (Lamarck 1814)
- Caulospongia plicata Kent, 1871
- Caulospongia reticulata Fromont, 1998
- Caulospongia venosa Fromont, 1998
