= Aaptos aaptos =

Scientific classification
- Kingdom: Animalia
- Phylum: Porifera
- Class: Demospongiae
- Order: Suberitida
- Family: Suberitidae
- Genus: Aaptos aaptos (Schmidt, 1864)

Synonyms
- List: Aaptos adriatica Gray, 1867; Ancorina aaptos Schmidt, 1864; Ancorina adriatica sensu Van Soest, 2002 [lapsus]; Suberites aaptus (Schmidt, 1864); Suberites spissus Topsent, 1892; Tuberella aaptos (Schmidt, 1864); Tuberella tethyoides Keller, 1880

Species of sponge

Aaptos aaptos is a species of sea sponge belonging to the family Suberitidae, first described in 1864 by Eduard Oscar Schmidt.

This particular species is known to contain adrenoceptor-blocking compounds. While it is highly toxic to fish, it is known to be preyed upon by the hawksbill turtle, Eretmochelys imbricata.

The methanol extract of Aaptos aaptos has been found to reduce the antioxidants in cancer cells, which increases oxidative stress selectively in cells which contributes to their antiproliferative effects.

Aaptamine, an alkaloid isolated from Aaptos aaptos
