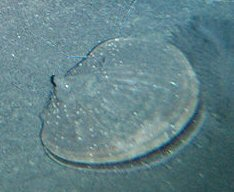
- Antarctic scallop on the seabed under 5 meters of sea ice in the Ross Sea, Antarctica.

Scientific classification
- Kingdom: Animalia
- Phylum: Mollusca
- Class: Bivalvia
- Order: Pectinida
- Superfamily: Pectinoidea
- Family: Pectinidae
- Genus: Adamussium
- Species: A. colbecki

Binomial name
- Adamussium colbecki (Smith, 1902)

Synonyms
- Pecten colbecki Smith, 1902

= Antarctic scallop =

Genus of bivalves

The Antarctic scallop (Adamussium colbecki) is a species of bivalve mollusc in the large family of scallops, the Pectinidae. It was thought to be the only species in the genus Adamussium until an extinct Pliocene species was described in 2016. Its exact relationship to other members of the Pectinidae is unclear. It is found in the ice-cold seas surrounding Antarctica, sometimes at great depths.

Adamussium colbecki is a large, slow-growing scallop that lives on the seabed. The shell consists of a pair of ribbed calcareous valves which enclose the soft body and are joined by a ligament at a hinge. It feeds on microscopic green algae and is sometimes present in great numbers. It is able to move around by flapping its valves and to dart backwards to escape threats. The species is an important member of the Antarctic seabed community as the upper valve often acts as a substrate for seaweeds, sponges and other organisms. In addition, juveniles bind themselves by threads to the upper valve of older shells, using these as a base for several years as they grow. The adult scallops have been used in research to study the accumulation of heavy metals in marine organisms.

== Taxonomy ==
The Antarctic scallop was first described by the British zoologist Edgar Albert Smith in 1902 as Pecten colbecki. He worked at the British Museum and was responsible for examining and describing shells from collections made over the years that had been deposited there. The German malacologist Johannes Thiele determined in 1934 that the characteristics of the Antarctic scallop were sufficiently different from those of other members of the genus Pecten to warrant its inclusion in a separate genus, Adamussium. More recently, examinations of the chromosome structure and of the mitochondrial DNA of A. colbecki have been undertaken, but the exact phylogenetic relationship it has with other pectinids is still unclear. The specific name most likely honours William Colbeck, the cartographer and magnetic observer on the British Southern Cross Antarctic Expedition (1898–1900).

== Description ==
The Antarctic scallop's shell grows to about 7 centimetres (2.8 in) long and 7 centimetres wide and has a nearly circular outline. The two purplish-red valves are paper thin and only slightly convex and are attached by a long, slightly sinuous, hinge. Near the hinge there is an umbo or beak on each valve, a raised hump from which the ribs radiate. The umbones are not very prominent and on either side of them are irregular winged processes, the auricles. In smaller specimens there are around 12 shallow ribs diverging from the umbones and further low ridges appear between these as the shell grows larger. There is a fine sculpturing of concentric lines on the outside of the valves. The auricles are also finely sculpted with the annual growth lines visible. The interior of the valves is pink. A fringe of numerous small tentacles project from the mantle between the two valves and there are a number of simple eyes in a row around the rim. The valves are held closed by powerful adductor muscles which work in opposition to an elastic ligament that lies just behind the umbones and which tends to open the valves. The flanges of the auricles provide a wide attachment for this ligament. The Antarctic scallop could be confused with other scallops, other bivalves or lamp shells.

== Distribution and habitat ==
The Antarctic scallop is endemic to the waters surrounding Antarctica. These are mostly within the Antarctic Circle and include the Ross Sea, the Weddell Sea, the Davis Sea, McMurdo Sound and the Southern Ocean. Although it is commonly found at depths of less than 100 metres (330 ft), remotely operated underwater vehicles armed with lights and cameras have recorded the scallop at much greater depths, including one recording at 4,840 metres (15,880 ft). It is found on many different substrates including sand, gravel and silt, either on the surface or semi-submerged in the sediment. It can flap its gills slightly to create a hollow in which to settle. In shallow waters it is usually attached by byssus threads to hard surfaces so as not to be swept away by water movement. At greater depths it is usually free living.

Although the Antarctic scallop has a circum-polar distribution, this is very disjunct, and overall it is not common. In some places it is found at densities of up to 90 per square metre and in Terra Nova Bay in the Ross Sea, at depths between 40 metres (130 ft) and 80 metres (260 ft), some scallop beds were found to be so crowded that adult individuals were lying on top of others. In other locations that seem eminently suitable in many ways, it was entirely absent. A possible explanation for this lies in the fact that its paper thin shell is characteristic of bivalves living in stable, deep water areas with little water movement. The shallower locations in which it now thrives are characterised by being protected bays or by having extensive sea ice coverage, each of which provides a stable environment unaffected by storm waves and where iceberg scouring does not normally occur. It is also absent from habitats dominated by other benthic suspension feeding communities whereas it is found in habitats with soft sediments and no dominant cnidarian and sponge communities. This might be because its larvae face such heavy predation in these locations that it is unable to establish itself.

== Behaviour ==
=== Locomotion ===
The Antarctic scallop can swim rather slowly by opening and closing its valves. It advances in this way with the rim of the shell to the front. It can detect the movement of nearby objects with its rudimentary eyes and, in order to escape predators, can move much more swiftly umbones first, by clapping its valves shut. A remotely controlled camera stationed on the sea bed is apt to find that all the scallops that were originally in its field of view have moved off to other locations.

=== Feeding ===
Like other members of the family Pectinidae, the Antarctic scallop is a suspension feeder, extracting its nourishment from the sea water that surrounds it. Bands of cilia on the velum, a curtain-like fold of the mantle, waft particles towards the gills. Oxygen is absorbed by the gills and food particles, mostly microscopic algae, are trapped in mucus and transported to the mouth by cilia. There is a seasonal increase in microscopic ice algae which become available to suspension feeders when the sea ice melts in the summer, and most of the annual growth takes place at this time. Research has shown that this is as a result of the rise in sea temperature and not the greater availability of food.

=== Reproduction ===
The rate of growth of the Antarctic scallop is very slow compared to that of scallops living in warmer seas. It matures at 5 to 7 years old and spawning takes place in late summer. Little is known about the development of the veliger larvae but they may be planktonic for 4 or 5 months. Besides feeding on phytoplankton and small zooplankton, they may absorb dissolved organic matter and consume bacterioplankton. When they settle, metamorphosis takes place and the juveniles attach themselves with byssus threads, often attaching these to the upper valves of scallops, and remain attached for 3 to 5 years. While attached to the adult shell, the juveniles benefit from food particles in the fine detritus thrown up into the water column by movements of the adult. While studying the sizes and growth rates of adults, researchers came to realize that there were gaps in their records which were due to the fact that, in some years, no juveniles had survived.

== Ecology ==
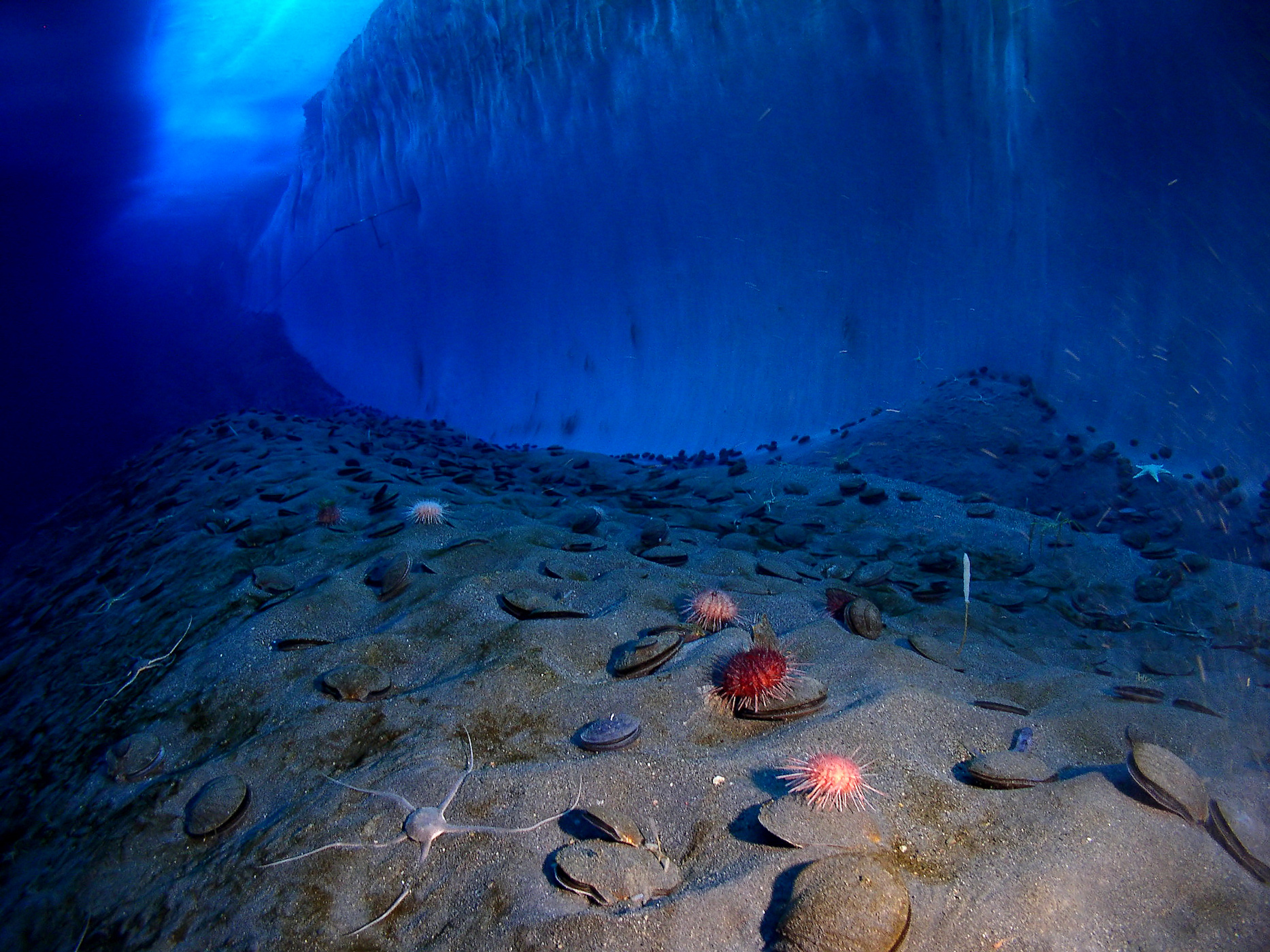
Underwater in McMurdo Sound with an ice wall behind and many Antarctic scallops, several sea urchins, Sterechinus neumayeri and brittle stars, Ophionotus victoriae, and a white club-shaped sponge, Homaxinella balfourensis

The Antarctic scallop is monitored in connection with the Vulnerable Marine Ecosystems (VME) classification set up by the Convention on the Conservation of Antarctic Marine Living Resources (CCAMLR). As such, notification is required to be made by vessels that land the scallop as by-catch during their fishing activities.

The Antarctic scallop is often found living in association with the Antarctic sea urchin, Sterechinus neumayeri, and Odontaster validus, a species of sea star. Predatory invertebrates found in the vicinity of the Antarctic scallop include the gastropod Neobuccinum eatoni, and the ribbon worm Parborlasia corrugatus. The foraging techniques of the emerald rockcod (Trematomus bernacchii) enable to be one of the main predators of the medium-sized Antarctic scallops. Otherwise the Antarctic scallop does not itself have many predators and large individuals are adept at jumping and swimming to escape attackers. Any attached juveniles benefit from this. However, the scallops are intolerant of low salinity levels, and mortality sometimes occurs as a result of a pool of relatively fresh water that sometimes forms during the summer months under the sea ice as it melts.

There are a large number of epifaunal organisms living on the shells of Antarctic scallops, which may represent 90% of the hard substrate available in a region where rocky surfaces are not common and much of the seabed consists of sediment. Because a diverse community of invertebrates and algae use its shell as a base, the Antarctic scallop is considered to be a "foundation species"; a species of great importance in its habitat. The fact that the scallops can swim and move to other locations aids in the dispersal of these organisms. The epiphytes include benthic diatoms, forams, bacteria, bryozoans, sponges and algae. The foram Cibicides refulgens lives parasitically on the scallop's shell and also grazes on the algae and bacteria growing there. In a research study, 10 different species of demosponge were found growing on a single Antarctic scallop. The demosponge Homaxinella balfourensis was one of the commonest epibionts growing harmlessly on the scallop's shell. The relationship between sponge and scallop may be symbiotic; the sponge avoids being engulfed in sediment while the scallop benefits from the protection provided by the sponge, which is distasteful to many predators.

The hydroid Hydractinia angusta has a mutualistic relationship with the scallop. A study showed that its larvae preferentially settled in the vicinity of other epibionts, usually on scallop shells, and that the scallop larvae were deterred from settling in the vicinity of colonies of the hydroid. It is surmised that the hydroid benefits from a solid substrate on which to live, and although the scallop benefits from the protection from predators provided by the stinging cells of the hydroid, it is disadvantaged by the failure of its larvae to establish themselves in their preferred location, on the shells of mature scallops.

== Research ==
A laboratory study examined the effects on the Antarctic scallop of an increase in lead, copper and mercury content in the water. It was found that a rise in levels of heavy metals led to quite severe morphological changes in the scallop and a reduction in lysosomal membrane stability. Another experiment involved transplanting scallops from a clean water area to a bay where effluent from an Antarctic base was released. It was found that the scallops were relatively unaffected by the outflows and this resulted in the belief that benthic marine communities were unlikely to be severely affected by such discharges.

Another study analysed the tissues of Adamussium colbecki and compared them with those of Pecten jacobaeus, a temperate water species of scallop. It was found that copper, iron, cadmium and chromium were concentrated in the digestive organ of the Antarctic scallop. Cadmium levels in particular were higher in the Antarctic scallop than in P. jacobaeus and other pectinids, but zinc and manganese, found in the kidney, were considerably lower.
