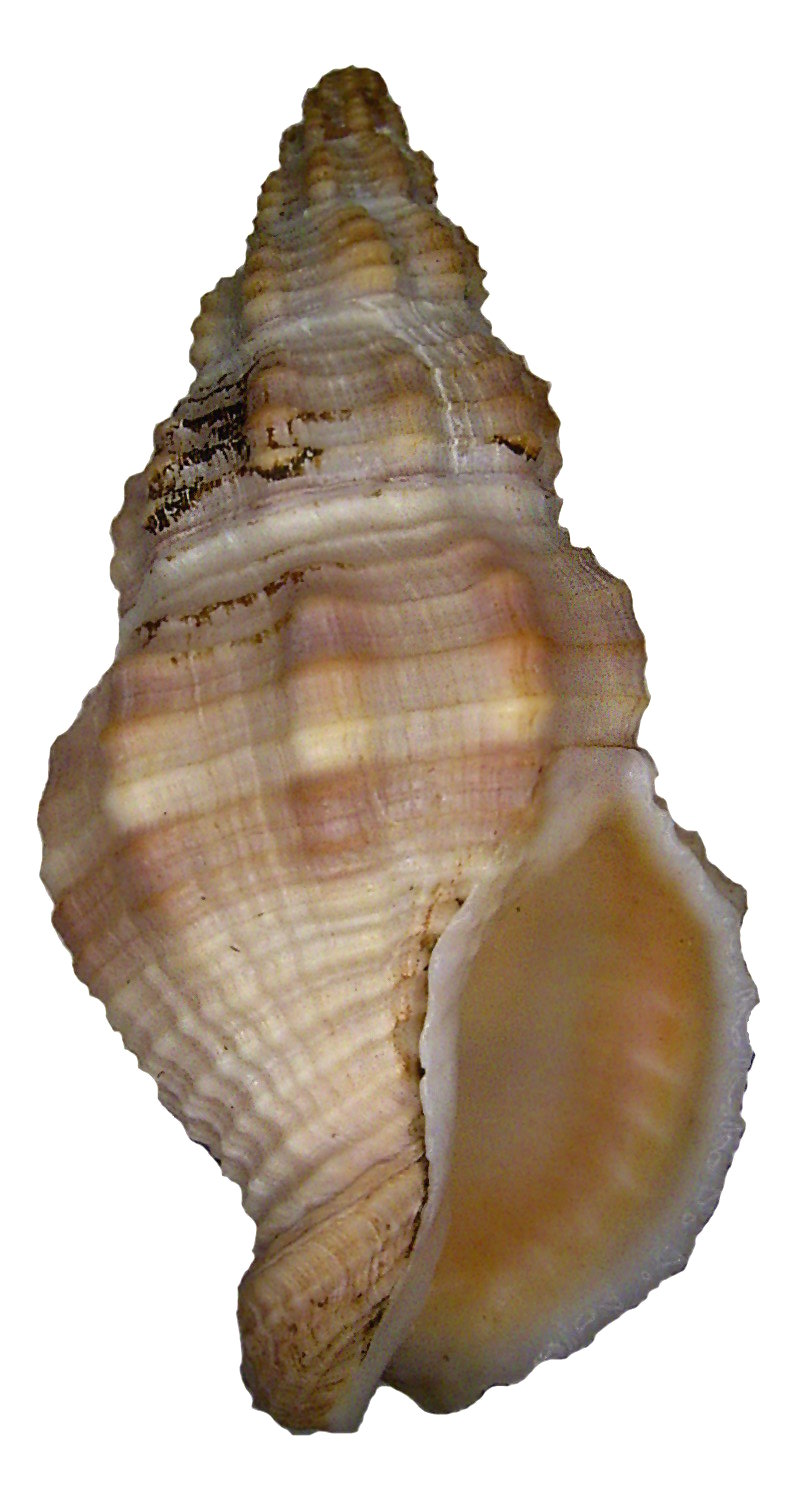

Scientific classification
- Kingdom: Animalia
- Phylum: Mollusca
- Class: Gastropoda
- Subclass: Caenogastropoda
- Order: Neogastropoda
- Family: Pisaniidae
- Genus: Cantharus
- Species: C. elegans

Binomial name
- Cantharus elegans (Griffith & Pidgeon, 1834)

= Cantharus elegans =

Species of gastropod

Cantharus elegans is a species of sea snails in the family Pisaniidae, the true whelks. It is found in Panama and Mexico.
