= Lygniodes morio =

Scientific classification
- Kingdom: Animalia
- Phylum: Arthropoda
- Class: Insecta
- Order: Lepidoptera
- Superfamily: Noctuoidea
- Family: Erebidae
- Genus: Lygniodes
- Species: L. morio

Binomial name
- Lygniodes morio (Semper, 1900)

Synonyms
- Agonista morio Semper, 1900

Species of moth

Lygniodes morio is a moth of the family Erebidae. It is found in the Philippines (Mindanao, Luzon).
