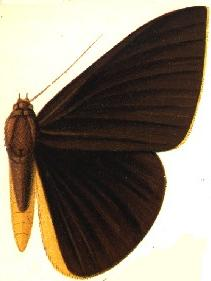

Scientific classification
- Kingdom: Animalia
- Phylum: Arthropoda
- Class: Insecta
- Order: Lepidoptera
- Superfamily: Noctuoidea
- Family: Erebidae
- Genus: Lygniodes
- Species: L. plateni

Binomial name
- Lygniodes plateni Pagenstecher, 1890

Synonyms
- Agonista plateni

= Lygniodes plateni =

Species of moth

Lygniodes plateni is a moth of the family Erebidae. It is found on the Philippines, including Palawan.
