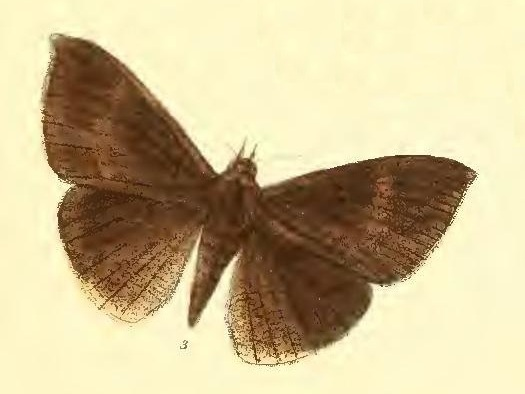
- Male
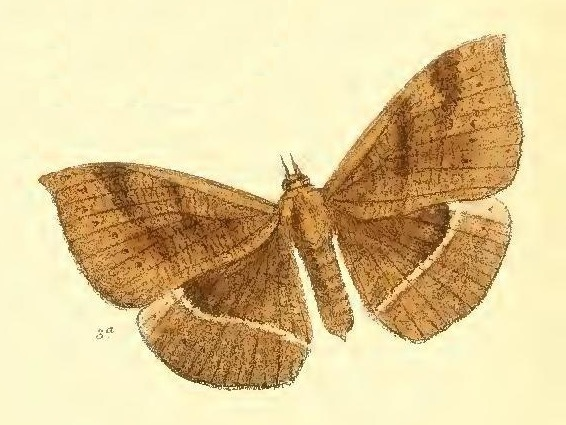
- Female

Scientific classification
- Kingdom: Animalia
- Phylum: Arthropoda
- Class: Insecta
- Order: Lepidoptera
- Superfamily: Noctuoidea
- Family: Erebidae
- Genus: Lygniodes
- Species: L. vampyrus

Binomial name
- Lygniodes vampyrus (Fabricius, 1794)

Synonyms
- Noctua vampyrus Fabricius, 1794; Lygniodes disparans Walker, 1858; Lygniodes e-antiqua Hampson, 1891; Lygniodes reducens Walker, 1858

= Lygniodes vampyrus =

Species of moth

Lygniodes vampyrus is a moth of the family Erebidae. It is found in the South India, Sri Lanka and Thailand.

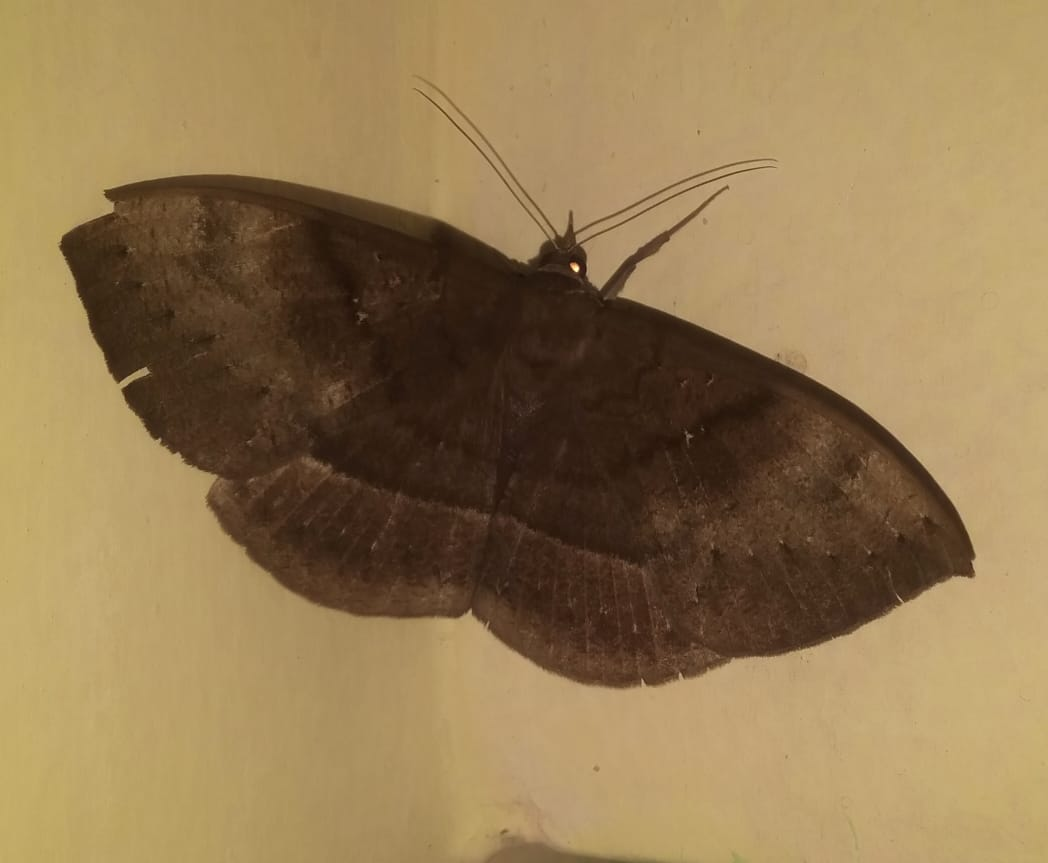
male
