= Stylocordylidae =

Scientific classification
- Kingdom: Animalia
- Phylum: Porifera
- Class: Demospongiae
- Order: Suberitida
- Family: Stylocordylidae

Family of sponges

Stylocordylidae is a family of sponges belonging to the order Suberitida.

Genera:

- Stylocordyla Thomson, 1873
