= Lygniodes =

Scientific classification
- Kingdom: Animalia
- Phylum: Arthropoda
- Class: Insecta
- Order: Lepidoptera
- Superfamily: Noctuoidea
- Family: Erebidae
- Tribe: Erebini
- Genus: Lygniodes; Guenée, 1852

Synonyms
- Agonista Rogenhofer, 1874

Genus of moths

Lygniodes is a genus of moths in the family Erebidae first described by Achille Guenée in 1852. The genus is restricted to the Asiatic tropics, east to Sulawesi and the Moluccas.

== Description ==
Palpi with second joint reaching vertex of head, and third joint moderate length. Antennae simple. Thorax and abdomen smoothly scaled. Mid tibia spined and hind tibia slightly hairy. Forewings with arched costa, slightly produced and acute apex. Hindwings with very short cell. Vein 5 arise from near lower angle and vein 6 much curved.

== Species ==
- Lygniodes ciliata
- Lygniodes endoleucus
- Lygniodes hypoleuca
- Lygniodes hypopyrrha Strand, 1913
- Lygniodes morio Semper, 1900
- Lygniodes ochrifera Felder, 1874
- Lygniodes plateni
- Lygniodes proutae Hulstaert, 1924
- Lygniodes schoenbergi Pagenstecher, 1890
- Lygniodes vampyrus

== Former species ==
- Lygniodes maurus Butler, 1892
