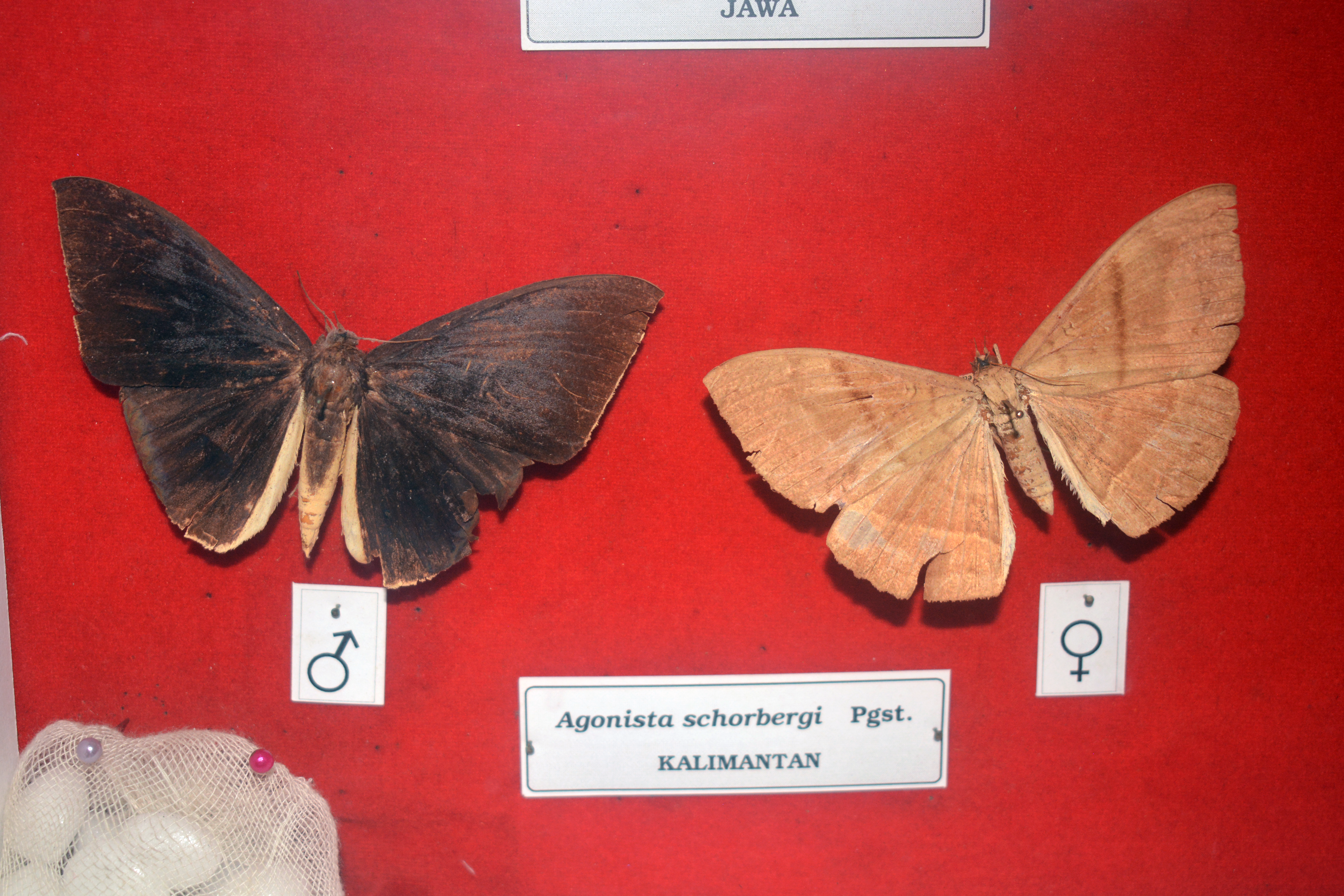
- Specimen in Bogor Zoology Museum

Scientific classification
- Kingdom: Animalia
- Phylum: Arthropoda
- Class: Insecta
- Order: Lepidoptera
- Superfamily: Noctuoidea
- Family: Erebidae
- Genus: Lygniodes
- Species: L. schoenbergi

Binomial name
- Lygniodes schoenbergi Pagenstecher, 1890

Synonyms
- Lygniodes plateni f. schönbergi; Lygniodes maurus Butler, 1892; Lygniodes endochrysa L.B. Prout, 1919; Agonista schönbergi; Agonista endochrysa; Agonista schoenbergi

= Lygniodes schoenbergi =

Species of moth

Lygniodes schoenbergi is a moth of the family Erebidae. It is found on Borneo. The habitat mainly consists of lowland forests, particularly alluvial forests.
