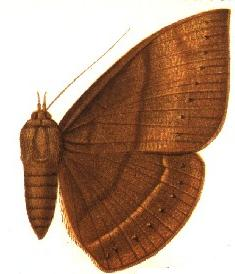
- Lygniodes hypoleuca female
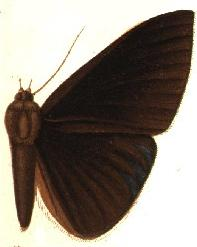
- Lygniodes hypoleuca male

Scientific classification
- Kingdom: Animalia
- Phylum: Arthropoda
- Class: Insecta
- Order: Lepidoptera
- Superfamily: Noctuoidea
- Family: Erebidae
- Genus: Lygniodes
- Species: L. hypoleuca

Binomial name
- Lygniodes hypoleuca Guenée, 1852

Synonyms
- Agonista hypoleuca

= Lygniodes hypoleuca =

Species of moth

Lygniodes hypoleuca is a moth of the family Erebidae. It is found in Taiwan.
