= Lygniodes proutae =

Scientific classification
- Kingdom: Animalia
- Phylum: Arthropoda
- Class: Insecta
- Order: Lepidoptera
- Superfamily: Noctuoidea
- Family: Erebidae
- Genus: Lygniodes
- Species: L. proutae

Binomial name
- Lygniodes proutae (Hulstaert, 1924)

Synonyms
- Agonista proutae Hulstaert, 1924

Species of moth

Lygniodes proutae is a moth of the family Erebidae. It is found in the Philippines (Mindanao).
