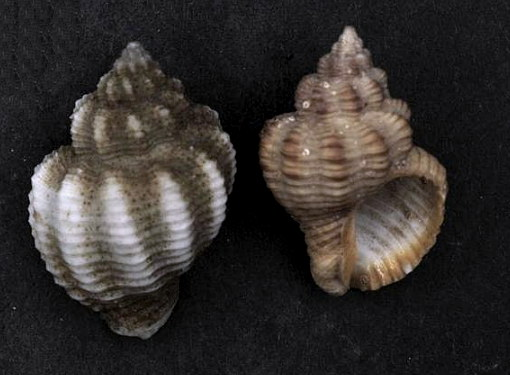
- Two views of a shell of Cantharus tranquebaricus (museum specimens at Naturalis Biodiversity Center)

Scientific classification
- Kingdom: Animalia
- Phylum: Mollusca
- Class: Gastropoda
- Subclass: Caenogastropoda
- Order: Neogastropoda
- Family: Pisaniidae
- Genus: Cantharus
- Species: C. tranquebaricus

Binomial name
- Cantharus tranquebaricus (Gmelin, 1791)

Synonyms
- Buccinum tranquebaricum Gmelin, 1791 (original combination); Cantharus globularis Röding, 1798

= Cantharus tranquebaricus =

Species of gastropod

Cantharus tranquebaricus, common name the Tranquebar goblet, is a species of sea snail, a marine gastropod mollusk in the family Pisaniidae, the true whelks.

== Description ==
The length of the shell varies between 30 mm and 40 mm.

The shell is ovate and ventricose. It is of a uniform whitish or reddish color, furnished with ten or twelve longitudinal folds upon each whorl, and crossed by numerous transverse striae. It is covered with a thin, brown epidermis. The spire is but little raised, subturreted, pointed at its upper extremity. It is formed of five or six tapering whorls, flattened, keeled, crowned at their upper part, and constricted at their suture. The aperture is ovate, emargination slightly oblique. The outer lip is rather thin, of an orange color, denticulated, and strongly striated within. The columella is subumbilicated, smooth, brown or reddish colored. The inner lip shows a callosity at the base, and partially covering the commencement of an umbilicus.

== Distribution ==
This marine species occurs off the Bay of Bengal; off Mozambique; as an invasive species in the Mediterranean Sea.
