= Liatris cokeri =

Conservation status
- Vulnerable (NatureServe)

Scientific classification
- Kingdom: Plantae
- Clade: Tracheophytes
- Clade: Angiosperms
- Clade: Eudicots
- Clade: Asterids
- Order: Asterales
- Family: Asteraceae
- Genus: Liatris
- Species: L. cokeri

Binomial name
- Liatris cokeri Pyne & Stucky

Species of flowering plant

Liatris cokeri, also known as Coker's gayfeather and sandhills blazing star (a name it shares with Liatris pilosa), is a plant species in the family Asteraceae and genus Liatris. It is native to North and South Carolina in the United States, where it is found in habitats such as sand ridges and sandy fields to roadsides; it is also found in turkey-oak and longleaf pine-oak plant communities. It blooms in late summer with purple flower heads.

Liatris cokeri grows from rounded corms that produce hairless stems, 25 to 85 centimeters (10–34 inches) tall. The flowers are in dense heads, and the heads lack stems or have stems that orient the heads upward. The heads are arranged in dense spike-like or raceme-like collections and the heads tend to face the same direction, especially on reclining branches. Each head has 4–9 disc flowers but no ray flowers The basal and cauline leaves have one nerve each and are lance-linear to linear. The foliage is mostly hairless or may have some hairs on the margins; the leaves are gradually or abruptly reduced in size as they ascend the stem length. The plant flowers in August and October. The seed is produced in cypselae fruits that are 3 to 4+ millimeters long with feathery bristle-like pappi with minute barbs.
