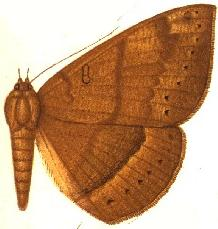
- Lygniodes endoleucus female
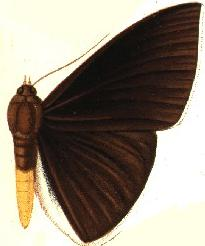
- Lygniodes endoleucus male

Scientific classification
- Kingdom: Animalia
- Phylum: Arthropoda
- Clade: Pancrustacea
- Class: Insecta
- Order: Lepidoptera
- Superfamily: Noctuoidea
- Family: Erebidae
- Genus: Lygniodes
- Species: L. endoleucus

Binomial name
- Lygniodes endoleucus (Guérin-Méneville, 1844)

Synonyms
- Erebus endoleucus Guérin-Méneville, 1844; Agonista endoleuca; Lygniodes endoleuca

= Lygniodes endoleucus =

Species of moth

Lygniodes endoleucus is a moth of the family Erebidae. It is found in India, Thailand, Malaysia, Myanmar, Vietnam, India, China, Java, Sumatra and Sulawesi.
