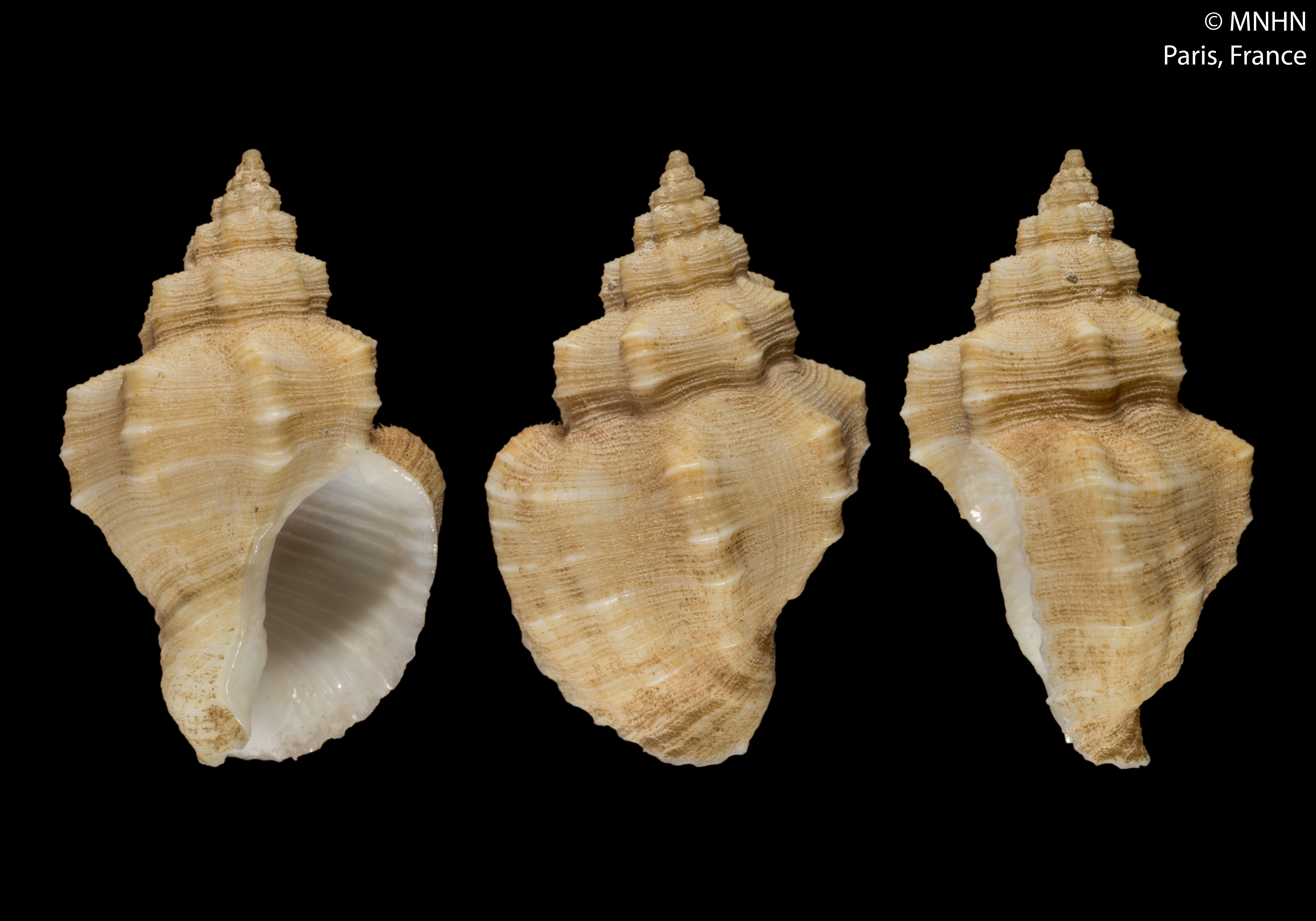
- Shell of Cantharus septemcostatus (holotype at MNHN, Paris)

Scientific classification
- Kingdom: Animalia
- Phylum: Mollusca
- Class: Gastropoda
- Subclass: Caenogastropoda
- Order: Neogastropoda
- Family: Pisaniidae
- Genus: Cantharus
- Species: C. septemcostatus

Binomial name
- Cantharus septemcostatus Vermeij & Bouchet, 1998

= Cantharus septemcostatus =

Species of gastropod

Cantharus septemcostatus is a species of sea snail, a marine gastropod mollusk in the family Pisaniidae, the true whelks.

== Distribution ==
This marine species occurs off New Caledonia.
