= Lygniodes hypopyrrha =

Scientific classification
- Kingdom: Animalia
- Phylum: Arthropoda
- Class: Insecta
- Order: Lepidoptera
- Superfamily: Noctuoidea
- Family: Erebidae
- Genus: Lygniodes
- Species: L. hypopyrrha

Binomial name
- Lygniodes hypopyrrha (Strand, 1913)

Synonyms
- Agonista hypopyrrha Strand, 1913

Species of moth

Lygniodes hypopyrrha is a moth of the family Erebidae. It is found in the Philippines (Mindanao).
