= Lygniodes ochrifera =

Scientific classification
- Kingdom: Animalia
- Phylum: Arthropoda
- Class: Insecta
- Order: Lepidoptera
- Superfamily: Noctuoidea
- Family: Erebidae
- Genus: Lygniodes
- Species: L. ochrifera

Binomial name
- Lygniodes ochrifera (Felder, 1874)

Synonyms
- Agonista ochrifera Felder, 1874; Lygniodes ochrifer

Species of moth

Lygniodes ochrifera is a moth of the family Erebidae. It is found in Indonesia (Sulawesi, Moluccas).
