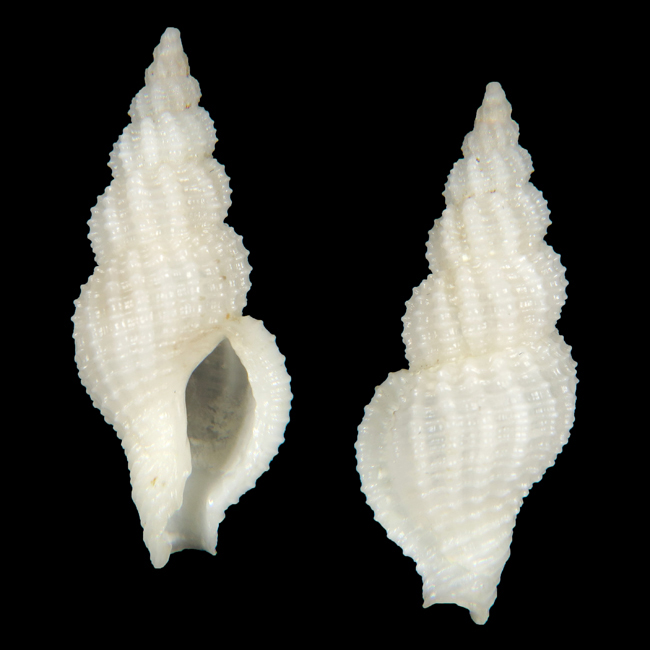

Scientific classification
- Kingdom: Animalia
- Phylum: Mollusca
- Class: Gastropoda
- Subclass: Caenogastropoda
- Order: Neogastropoda
- Family: Pisaniidae
- Genus: Cantharus
- Species: C. petwayae

Binomial name
- Cantharus petwayae Poppe, Tagaro, & Goto 2018

= Cantharus petwayae =

Species of gastropod

Cantharus petwayae is a species of sea snail, a marine gastropod mollusk in the family Pisaniidae.

== Original description ==
- Poppe G.T., Tagaro S.P. & Goto Y. (2018). New marine species from the Central Philippines. Visaya. 5(1): 91–135. page(s): 101, pl. 7 figs 1–3.
