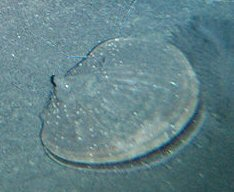
- Antarctic scallop on the seabed under 5 meters of sea ice in the Ross Sea, Antarctica.

Scientific classification
- Kingdom: Animalia
- Phylum: Mollusca
- Class: Bivalvia
- Order: Pectinida
- Family: Pectinidae
- Genus: Adamussium; Thiele, 1934

Type species
- Pecten colbecki Smith, 1902

= Adamussium =

Genus of molluscs

Adamussium is a genus of scallops belonging to the family Pectenidae from the Southern Ocean around Antarctica. There are three known species but only one is extant, the Antarctic scallop (A. colbecki). Of the two extinct species A. jonkersi is from the Oligocene deposits on King George Island in the South Shetland Islands and the other, A. necopinatum, was described in 2016 from Pliocene marine deposits in the Vestfold Hills of East Antarctica.

== Species ==
The following species are classified within the genus Adamussium:

- Adamussium colbecki (E. A. Smith, 1902) (Antarctic scallop)
- † Adamussium jonkersi Quaglio, Whittle, Gaździcki & Simoes, 2010
- † Adamussium necopinatum Quilty, Darragh, Gallagher & Harding, 2016

† means extinct
