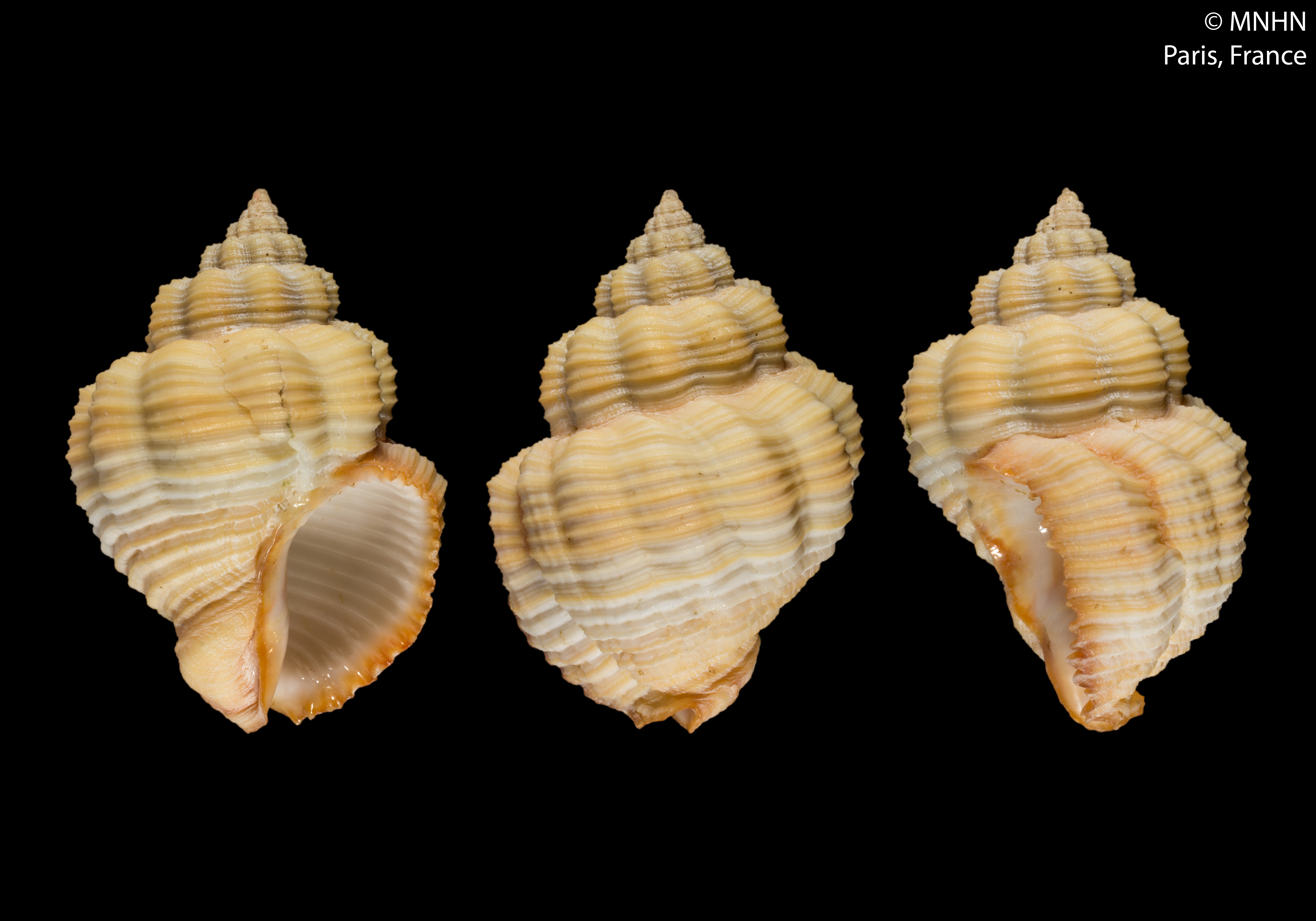
- Shell of Cantharus vermeiji (holotype at MNHN, Paris)

Scientific classification
- Kingdom: Animalia
- Phylum: Mollusca
- Class: Gastropoda
- Subclass: Caenogastropoda
- Order: Neogastropoda
- Family: Pisaniidae
- Genus: Cantharus
- Species: C. vermeiji

Binomial name
- Cantharus vermeiji Fraussen, 2008

= Cantharus vermeiji =

Species of gastropod

Cantharus vermeiji is a species of sea snail, a marine gastropod mollusk in the family Pisaniidae, the true whelks.
