= Giuseppe Olivi =

Italian naturalist

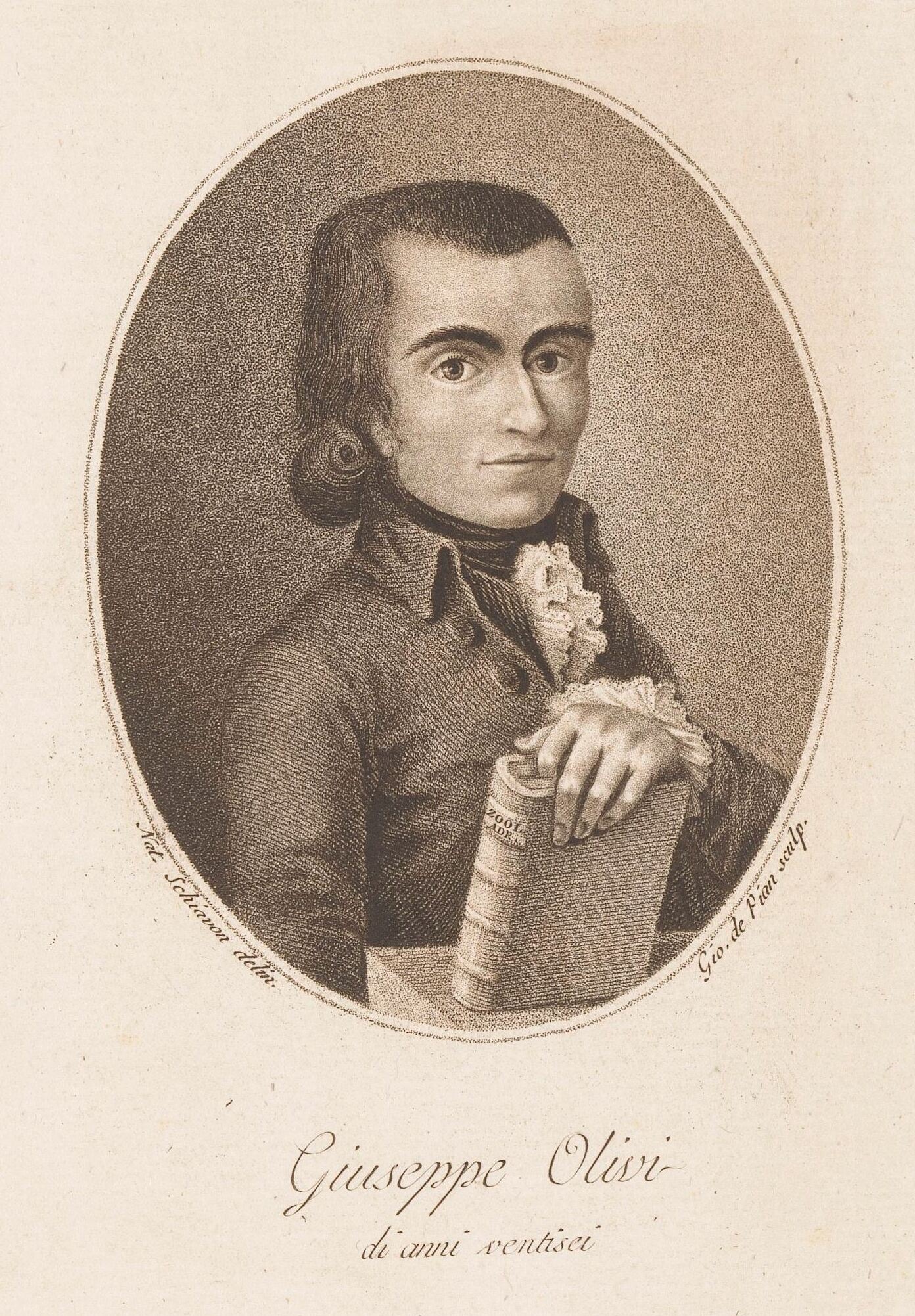
- Late Giuseppe Olivia picture by Melchiorre Cesarotti
- Born: 15 March 1769; Chioggia, Italy
- Died: 24 August 1795 (aged 26); Padua
- Known for: Zoologia Adriatica
- Scientific career
- Fields: Chemistry, mineralogy, agriculture, botany
- Author abbrev. (botany): Olivi
- Author abbrev. (zoology): Olivi

Giuseppe Olivi (18 March 1769 – 24 August 1795) was an Italian abbot and naturalist. He was born at Chioggia and was the author of Zoologia Adriatica (1792). He died in Padua when he was only 26.

== Biography ==
Olivi was born in Chioggia in 1769. He was educated in Choggia under the tutelage of Francesco and Giuseppe Fabris. Despite only having taken minor orders, he wore ecclesiastical garments and adopted the title of abbot. He had wide interests, which stretched from chemistry, where he supported the theories of Antoine Lavoisier, passing through mineralogy and agriculture, to botany, with particular reference to algae. He stood out among the late eighteenth century Italian naturalists in his independent outlook, questioning the theories prevalent at the time, and considering the ecological aspects of the animals he studied, and the impact they had on the environment.

Olivi was interested in the infusoria discovered by Antonie van Leeuwenhoek, the microscopic living organisms present in water whose existence had previously been unknown. He studied the Adriatic Sea, being one of the first naturalists to make observations under the water; he found great variations in the structure of the seabed and its associated fauna which inspired the palaeontologist Giovanni Battista Brocchi in his study of the strata and fossils of the Apennines. Gregor Mendel was another naturalist who was inspired by Olivi's work, mentioning him in the foreword to his 1866 work Versuche über Pflanzen-Hybriden. Olivi published the work for which he is principally remembered, Zoologia Adriatica, in 1792. It included descriptions of such invertebrates as Vorticella, Volvox and Hydra, and the sponge Suberites domuncula.

The well-known biologist Lazzaro Spallanzani thought highly of Olivi, and forecast a brilliant future for him, but this was not to be, because Olivi died in 1795 at the age of 26. He is buried in the church of Santa Cristina, Padua; a commemorative funeral bust is to be found in the cloister of the Basilica of Saint Anthony of Padua.
