= Aspergillus robustus =

Scientific classification
- Kingdom: Fungi
- Division: Ascomycota
- Class: Eurotiomycetes
- Order: Eurotiales
- Family: Aspergillaceae
- Genus: Aspergillus
- Species: A. robustus

Binomial name
- Aspergillus robustus M. Chr. & Raper (1978)

Species of fungus

Aspergillus robustus is a species of fungus in the genus Aspergillus. It has phototropic conidiophores. The species was first described in 1978. The genome of A. robustus was in 2016 sequenced as a part of the Aspergillus whole-genome sequencing project - a project dedicated to performing whole-genome sequencing of all members of the Aspergillus genus. The genome assembly size was 33.14 Mbp.

== Growth and morphology ==
Aspergillus robustus has been cultivated on both Czapek yeast extract agar (CYA) plates and Malt Extract Agar Oxoid (MEAOX) plates. The growth morphology of the colonies can be seen in the pictures below.

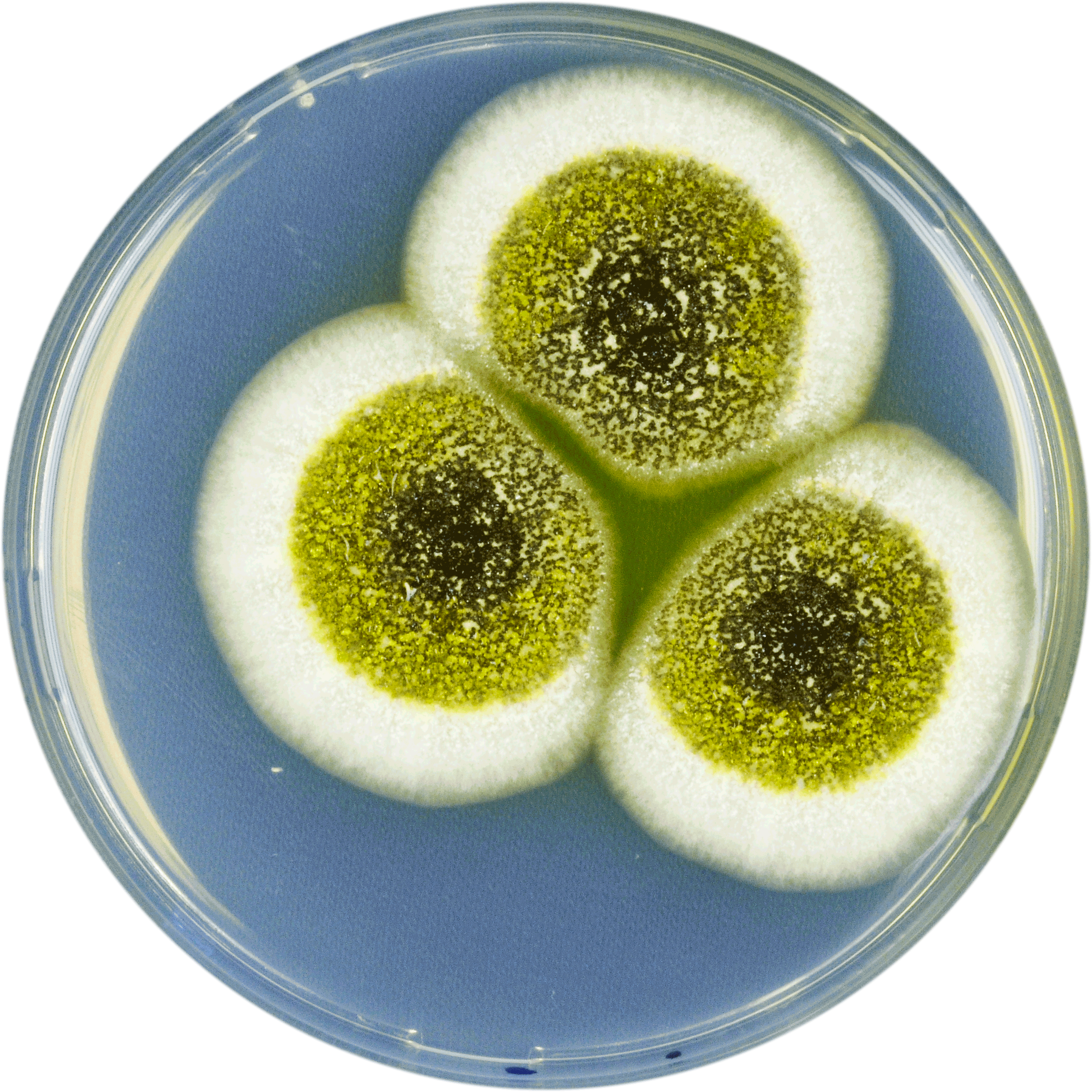
Aspergillus robustus growing on CYA plate

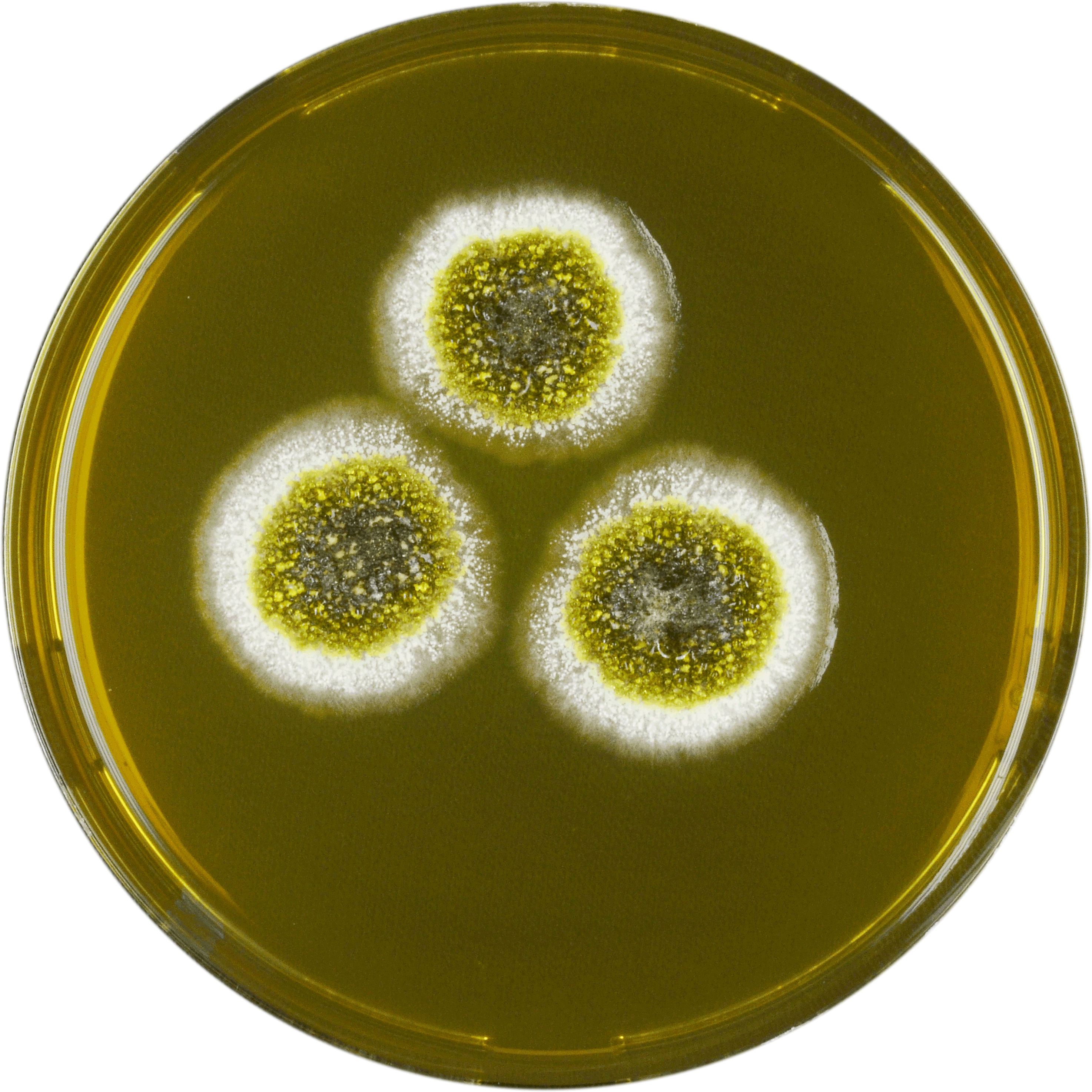
Aspergillus robustus growing on MEAOX plate
