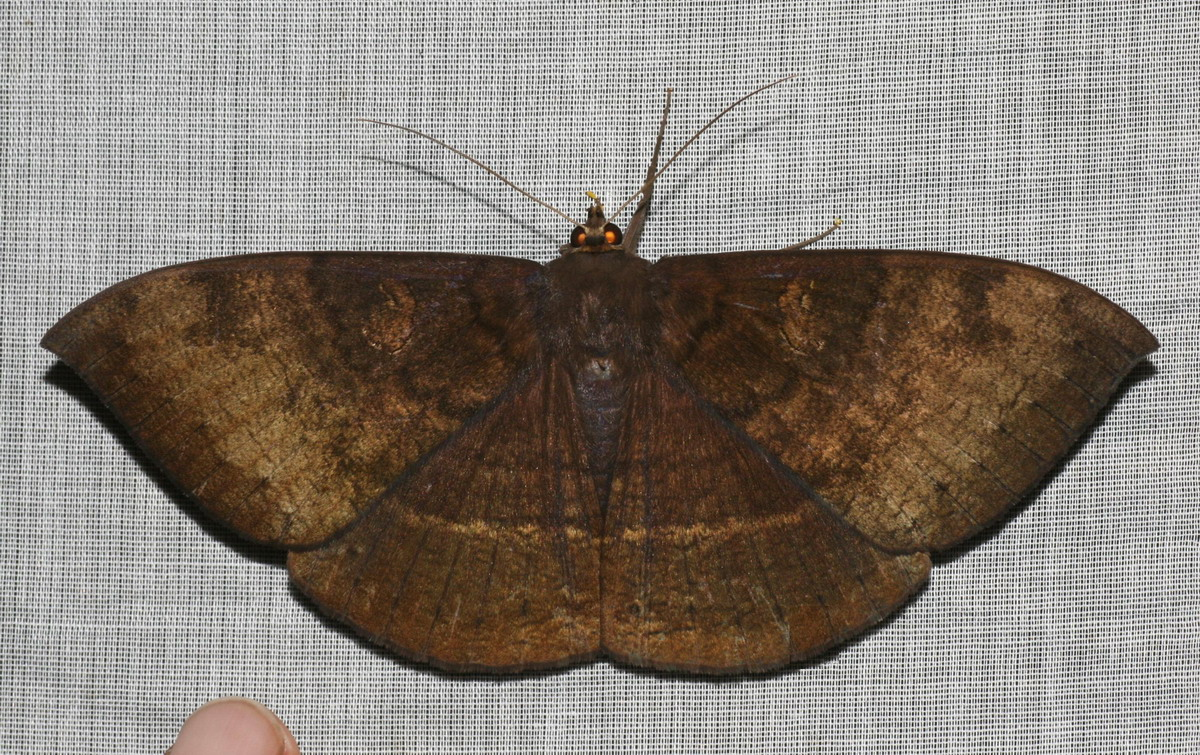

Scientific classification
- Kingdom: Animalia
- Phylum: Arthropoda
- Class: Insecta
- Order: Lepidoptera
- Superfamily: Noctuoidea
- Family: Erebidae
- Genus: Lygniodes
- Species: L. ciliata

Binomial name
- Lygniodes ciliata Moore, 1867

Synonyms
- Agonista ciliata; Agonista rufescens Leech, 1900; Lygniodes ciliatus

= Lygniodes ciliata =

Species of moth

Lygniodes ciliata is a species of moth in the family Erebidae first described by Frederic Moore in 1867. It is found in Thailand, Vietnam, India, Sri Lanka, Bangladesh, China, Sumatra and Taiwan.

== Description ==
Its wingspan is about 84 mm. Male is greyish brown with brown underside. Hindwings are greyish white with brown striae, except on costal area. Female has much browner underside. Some specimens have a stigma in the shape of Old English "E" at end of cell of forewings.

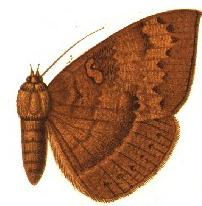
Female

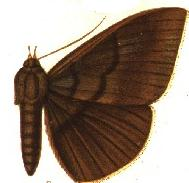
Male
