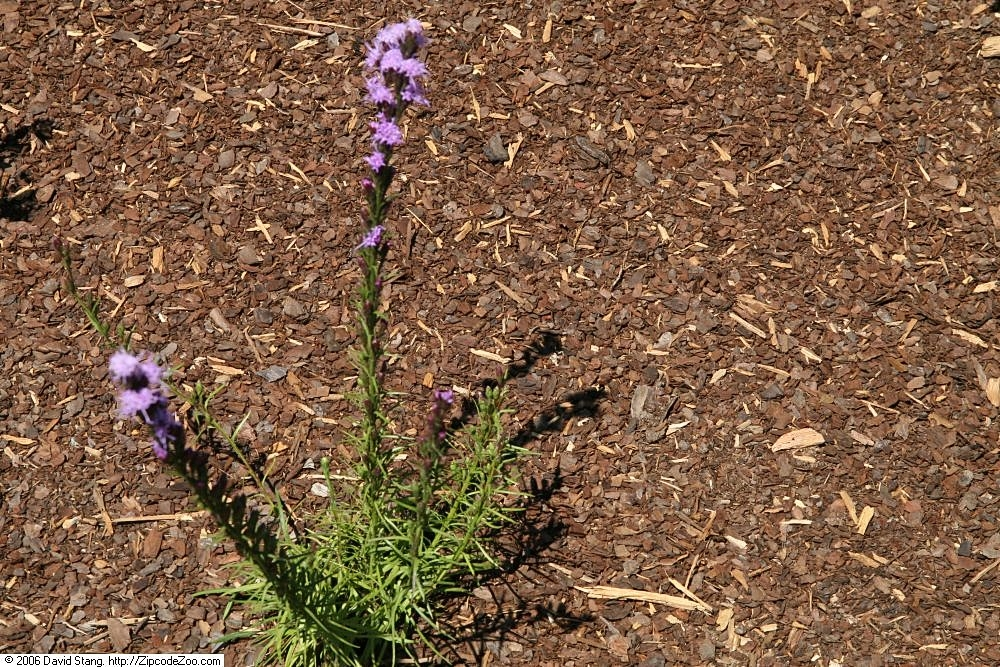
- At the United States Botanic Garden in Washington, DC

Scientific classification
- Kingdom: Plantae
- Clade: Embryophytes
- Clade: Tracheophytes
- Clade: Spermatophytes
- Clade: Angiosperms
- Clade: Eudicots
- Clade: Asterids
- Order: Asterales
- Family: Asteraceae
- Genus: Liatris
- Species: L. pilosa

Binomial name
- Liatris pilosa (Aiton) Willd.

Synonyms
- List: Anonymos ciliata Walter; Anonymos graminifolia Walter; Lacinaria graminifolia (Willd.) Kuntze; Lacinaria graminifolia var. pilosa (Aiton) Britton; Lacinaria pilosa (Aiton) A.Heller; Liatris dubia W.P.C.Barton; Liatris graminifolia Willd.; Liatris graminifolia var. dubia (W.P.C.Barton) A.Gray; Liatris graminifolia var. lasia Fernald & Griscom; Liatris graminifolia var. typica Gaiser; Liatris pilosa var. laevicaulis DC.; Liatris propinqua Hook.; Serratula pilosa Aiton

= Liatris pilosa =

Species of plant

Liatris pilosa (syn. Liatris graminifolia), the grass-leaf blazingstar, sandhills blazing star (a name it shares with Liatris cokeri), shaggy blazing star, or shaggy gayfeather, is a species of flowering plant in the family Asteraceae. It is native to the US states of Pennsylvania, New Jersey, Maryland, Delaware, Virginia, North Carolina, and South Carolina, east of the Appalachian Mountains. A perennial reaching 4 ft (1.2 m), it is typically found in open woodlands or forest edges, at the edges of salt marshes, and in dune depressions.

== Ecology ==
Liatris pilosa is insect pollinated and is recorded to have been visited in northern Florida by Agapostemon splendens.
