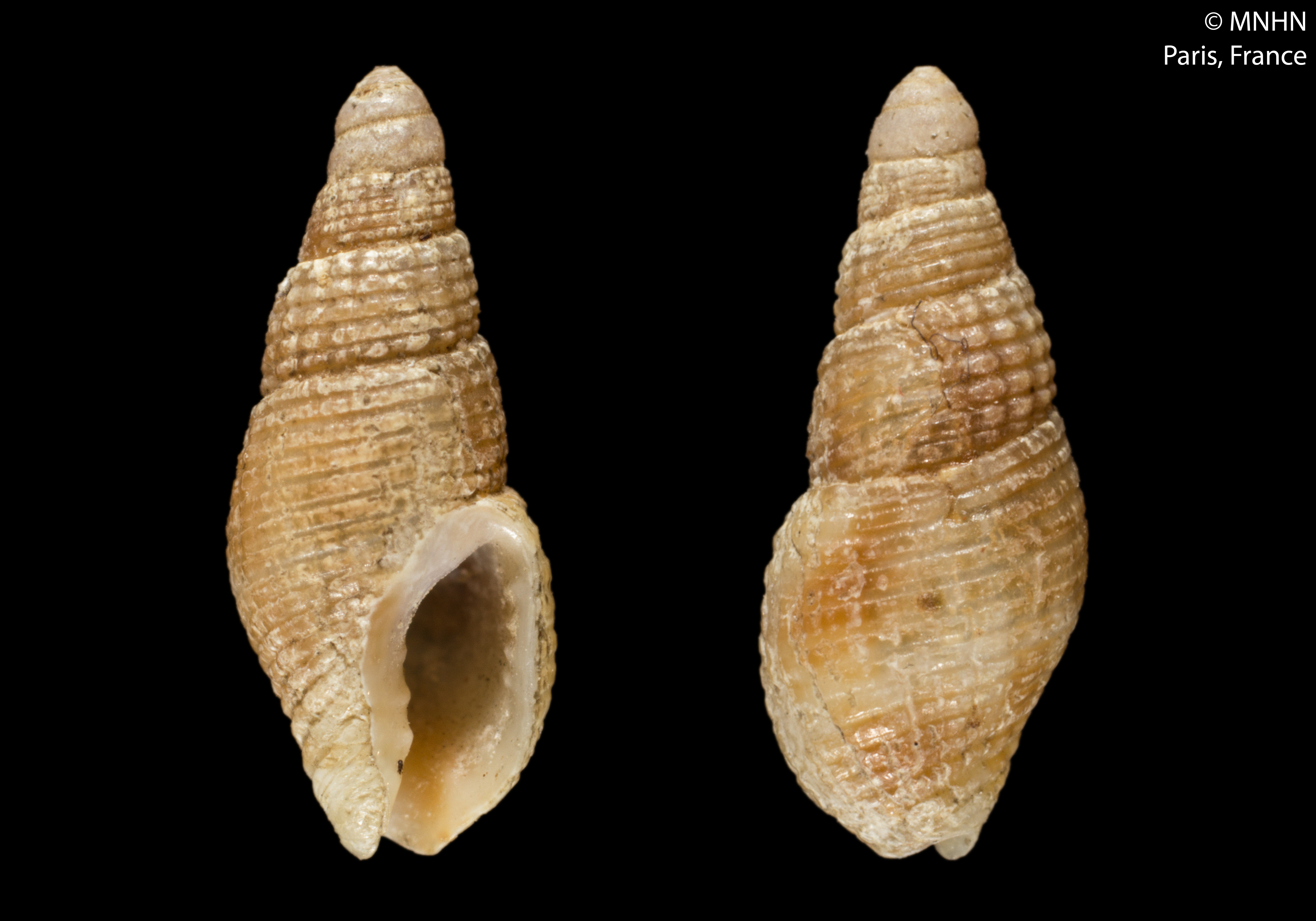
- Shell of Cantharus bolivianus (syntype at MNHN, Paris)

Scientific classification
- Kingdom: Animalia
- Phylum: Mollusca
- Class: Gastropoda
- Subclass: Caenogastropoda
- Order: Neogastropoda
- Family: Pisaniidae
- Genus: Cantharus; Röding, 1798

Type species
- Buccinum tranquebaricum Gmelin, 1791

Synonyms
- Tritonidea (Cantharus) Röding, 1798; †Zeapollia Finlay, 1926

= Cantharus (gastropod) =

Genus of gastropods

Cantharus is a genus of sea snails in the family Pisaniidae.

== Taxonomy ==
This genus was previously placed in family Fasciolariidae by some authors. The genus is sometimes split into subgenera.

== Species ==
As of 2020, the World Register of Marine Species accepts 14 extant and 1 extinct species in the genus Cantharus:

- †Cantharus acuticingulatus (Suter, 1917)
- Cantharus berryi McLean, 1970
- Cantharus bolivianus (Souleyet, 1852)
- Cantharus cecillei (Philippi, 1844)
- Cantharus erythrostoma (Reeve, 1846)
- Cantharus leucotaeniatus Kosuge, 1985
- Cantharus melanostoma (G.B. Sowerby I, 1825)
- Cantharus petwayae Poppe, Tagaro & Goto, 2018
- Cantharus rehderi Berry, 1962
- Cantharus salalahensis Cossignani, 2017
- Cantharus septemcostatus Vermeij & Bouchet, 1998
- Cantharus spiralis Gray, 1839
- Cantharus tranquebaricus (Gmelin, 1791)
- Cantharus vermeiji Fraussen, 2008
- Cantharus vezzarochristofei Cossignani, 2017

Cantharus elegans (Griffith & Pidgeon, 1834) is present in some databases, but not the World Register of Marine Species.

Cantharus porcatus H. Adams & A. Adams, 1864 is listed as a taxon inquirendum in the World Register of Marine Species.
