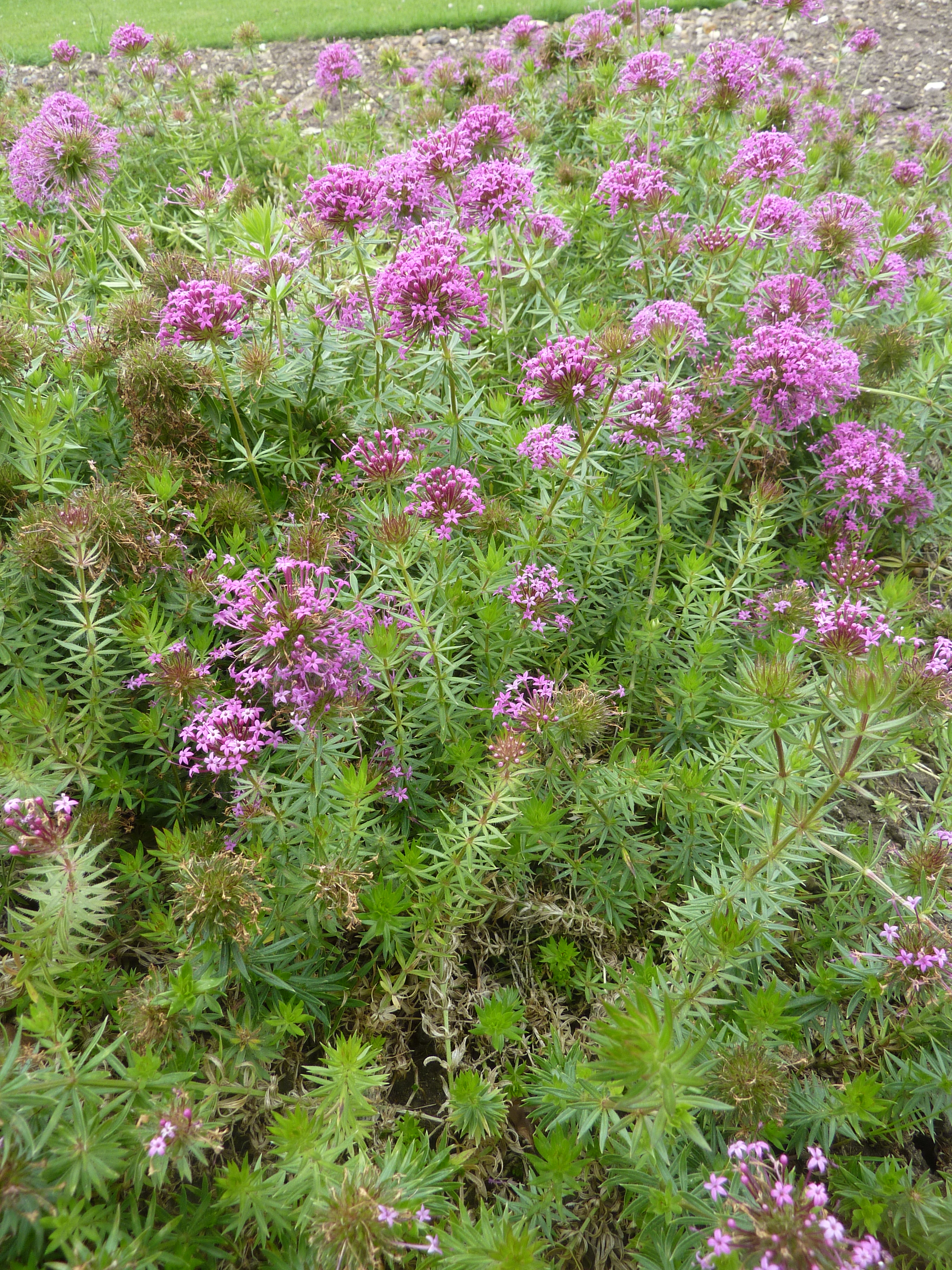

Scientific classification
- Kingdom: Plantae
- Clade: Tracheophytes
- Clade: Angiosperms
- Clade: Eudicots
- Clade: Asterids
- Order: Gentianales
- Family: Rubiaceae
- Genus: Phuopsis
- Species: P. stylosa

Binomial name
- Phuopsis stylosa (Trin.) Hook.f. ex B.D.Jacks, 1894

Synonyms
- Asperula ciliata Moench; Asperula stylosa (Trin.) Boiss.; Crucianella stylosa Trin.; Putoria calabrica Pers.

= Phuopsis stylosa =

Crosswort

Species of flowering plant in the madder family

Phuopsis stylosa, the Caucasian crosswort or large-styled crosswort, is a low-growing, mat-forming, aromatic perennial plant in the madder, or bedstraw family Rubiaceae. It has whorls of narrow, aromatic leaves and terminal clusters of tubular pink flowers. Phuopsis stylosa is native to the Caucasus and Iran, and is widely grown elsewhere as a garden plant.

The plant gives off an odor which can be confused with that of some Cannabis species.
