= Ataenius robustus =

Scientific classification
- Kingdom: Animalia
- Phylum: Arthropoda
- Clade: Pancrustacea
- Class: Insecta
- Order: Coleoptera
- Suborder: Polyphaga
- Infraorder: Scarabaeiformia
- Family: Scarabaeidae
- Genus: Ataenius
- Species: A. robustus

Binomial name
- Ataenius robustus Horn, 1871

Species of beetle

Ataenius robustus, the saline prairie scarab beetle, is a species of aphodiine dung beetle in the family Scarabaeidae. It is found in the United States (Arkansas, Illinois, Iowa, Kansas, Missouri, Nebraska, New Mexico, Oklahoma, South Dakota, Texas, Wisconsin).

== Description ==
Adults reach a length of about 3.8–4.7 mm (0.15–0.19 in). They have an oblong-oval, convex, shining, carbon black body, with reddish legs.
