= Silicases =

Enzyme that dissolves amorphous silica

The silicases are a family of enzymes that catalyze rearrangement of silicon-oxygen bonds and are found in some sea sponges.

The by-product of this reaction is silicic acid.

A zinc atom is held in place by three histidine residues. A fourth position on the zinc extracts a hydroxy group from water.

This reacts with an amorphous fragment of hydrated silica to break off silicic acid and leave zinc attached to the larger silica frament.

Zn-O-H + Si-O-Si(OH)_{3} → Zn-O-Si + H-O-Si(OH)_{3}

This is then hydrolysed:

Zn-O-Si + H_{2}O → Zn-OH + HO-Si

Silicases are related to a more common enzyme in animals, carbonic anhydrase. In the human body the carbonic anhydrase most similar to the sponge silicase is type II (CA-II).
