= Choanosome =

Type of structure within a sponge

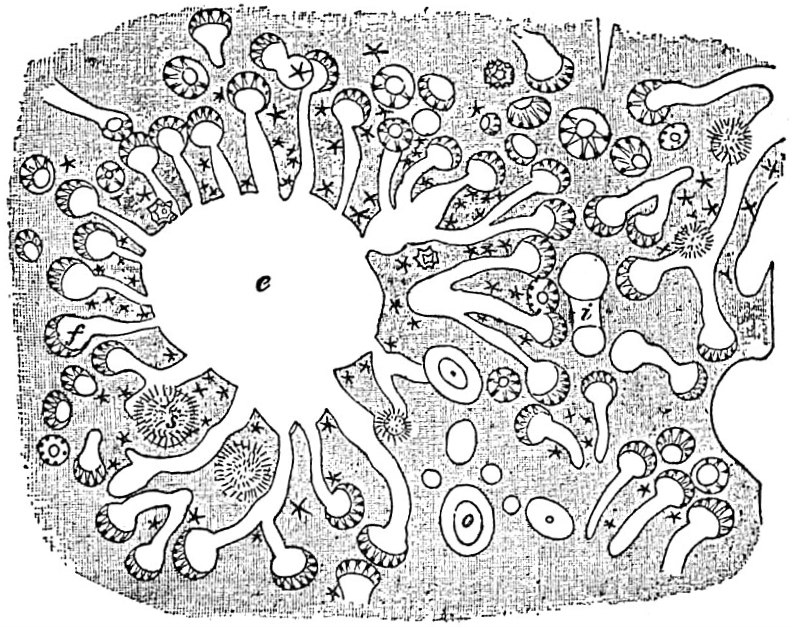
Transverse section across an exhalant canal and surrounding choanosome of Cydonium eosaster, showing the aphodal flagellated chambers

A choanosome is an inner region of a sponge, supported on the choanoskeleton, the structure that contains the choanocytes.

== See also ==
- Choanoderm
