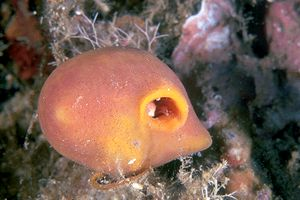
- Suberites domuncula

Scientific classification
- Kingdom: Animalia
- Phylum: Porifera
- Class: Demospongiae
- Order: Suberitida
- Family: Suberitidae; Schmidt, 1870

= Suberitidae =

Family of sponges

Suberitidae is a family of sea sponges belonging to the order Suberitida.

== Genera ==
The following genera are recognised in the family Suberitidae:

- Aaptos Gray, 1867
- Caulospongia Kent, 1871
- †Chaetetes Fischer, 1830
- Homaxinella Topsent, 1916
- Plicatellopsis Burton, 1932
- Protosuberites Swartschewsky, 1905
- Pseudospongosorites McCormack & Kelly, 2002
- Pseudosuberites Topsent, 1896
- Rhizaxinella Keller, 1880
- Suberites Nardo, 1833
- Terpios Duchassaing & Michelotti, 1864
