= Suberitida =

Scientific classification
- Domain: Eukaryota
- Kingdom: Animalia
- Phylum: Porifera
- Class: Demospongiae
- Subclass: Heteroscleromorpha
- Order: Suberitida

Order of sponges

Suberitida is an order of sponges belonging to the class Demospongiae.

Families:

- Halichondriidae
- Stylocordylidae
- Suberitidae
