= Memorization =

Cognitive process

Memorization (British English: memorisation) is the process of committing something to memory. It is a mental process undertaken in order to store in memory for later recall visual, auditory, or tactical information.

The scientific study of memory is part of cognitive neuroscience, an interdisciplinary link between cognitive psychology and neuroscience.

== Development ==
Within the first three years of a child's life, they begin to show signs of memory that is later improved into their adolescent years. This includes short-term memory, long-term memory, working memory, and autobiographical memory. Memory is a fundamental capacity that plays a special role in social, emotional, and cognitive functioning. Problems with studying the development of memorization include having to use verbal response and confirmation.

== Techniques ==
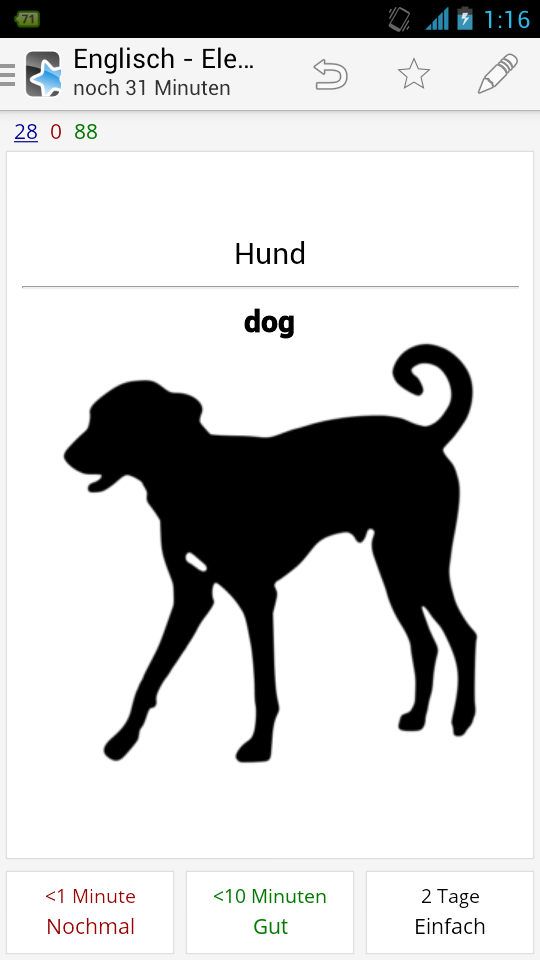
Memorizing or reviewing German-English vocabulary using flashcard software Anki, thus practicing active recall. First, only the question is displayed. Then the answer is displayed too, for verification.

Some principles and techniques that have been used to assist in memorization include:

=== Rote learning ===
Rote learning is a learning technique which focuses not on understanding but on memorization by means of repetition. For example, if words are to be learned, they may be repeatedly spoken aloud or repeatedly written down. Specialized forms of rote learning have also been used in Vedic chant since as long as three thousand years ago, to preserve the intonation and lexical accuracy of very long texts, some with tens of thousands of verses.

=== Spaced repetition ===
Spaced repetition is a principle of committing information into long-term memory by means of increasing time intervals between subsequent review of the previously learned material. Spaced repetition exploits the psychological spacing effect. This technique is combined with active recall by spaced repetition software such as SuperMemo, Anki or Mnemosyne.

=== Active recall ===
Active recall is a learning method that exploits the testing effect − the fact that memorization is more efficient when some time is devoted to actively retrieving the to-be-learned information through testing with proper feedback. Flashcards are a practical application of active recall. Another method for memorization is via the 'SURF' process (SURF is an acronym standing for: spotting 'Sonic patterns', 'Understanding' the text, 'Repetition/Recall/Rehearsal', 'Familiarity') which uses specific cyclic forms of active recall to, for instance, memorize poems for public performance.

=== Mnemonic ===
A mnemonic is a type of memory aid. Mnemonics are often verbal, such as a very short poem or a special word used to help a person remember something, particularly lists, but they may be visual, kinesthetic or auditory. Mnemonics rely on associations between easy-to-remember constructs which can be related back to the data that is to be remembered. This is based on the principle that the human mind much more easily remembers spatial, personal, surprising, sexual or humorous or otherwise meaningful information than arbitrary sequences.

=== Mnemonic link system ===
A mnemonic link system is a method of remembering lists, based on creating an association between the elements of that list. For example, if one wished to remember the list (dog, envelope, thirteen, yarn, window), one could create a link system, such as a story about a "dog stuck in an envelope, mailed to an unlucky black cat playing with yarn by the window". It is then argued that the story would be easier to remember than the list itself. Alternatively one could use visualisation, seeing in one's mind's eye an image that includes two elements in the list that are next to each other. One could imagine a dog inside a giant envelope, then visualise an unlucky black cat (or whatever that reminds the user 'thirteen') eating a huge envelope. In order to access a certain element of the list, one needs to "traverse" the system (much in the same vein as a linked list), in order to get the element from the system.

=== Mnemonic peg system ===
A peg system is a technique for memorizing lists. It works by pre-memorizing a list of words that are easy to associate with the numbers they represent (1 to 10, 1-100, 1-1000, etc.). Those objects form the "pegs" of the system. Then in the future, to rapidly memorize a list of arbitrary objects, each one is associated with the appropriate peg. Generally, a peglist only has to be memorized one time, and can then be used over and over every time a list of items needs to be memorized. The peglists are generated from words that are easy to associate with the numbers (or letters). Peg lists created from letters of the alphabet or from rhymes are very simple to learn, but are limited in the number of pegs they can produce.

=== Mnemonic major system ===
The major system is a mnemonic technique used to aid in memorizing numbers which is also called the phonetic number system or phonetic mnemonic system. It works by converting numbers first into consonant sounds, then into words by adding vowels. The words can then be remembered more easily than the numbers, especially when using other mnemonic rules which call for the words to be visual and emotive.

=== Method of loci ===
The method of loci or mind palace is a technique for memorizing practiced since classical antiquity which is a type of mnemonic link system based on places (loci, otherwise known as locations). It is often used where long lists of items need to be memorized. The technique was taught for many centuries as a part of the curriculum in schools, enabling an orator to easily remember a speech or students to easily remember many things at will.

=== Art of memory ===
The art of memory is a group of mnemonic principles and techniques used to organize memory impressions, improve recall, and assist in the combination and 'invention' of ideas. This group of principles was usually associated with training in Rhetoric or Logic from the time of Ancient Greece, but variants of the art were employed in other contexts, particularly the religious and the magical. Techniques commonly employed in the art include the association of emotionally striking memory images within visualized locations, the chaining or association of groups of images, the association of images with schematic graphics or notae ("signs, markings, figures" in Latin), and the association of text with images. Any or all of these techniques were often used in combination with the contemplation or study of architecture, books, sculpture and painting, which were seen by practitioners of the art of memory as externalizations of internal memory images and/or organization.

=== Other techniques ===
- It has been shown that sleep aids memory; this applies to naps as well.
- Dramatizing the information that needs to be memorized will help you remember it more. If said in an exaggerated and dramatic manner it will most likely not be forgotten,
- The "desirable difficulty" is a principle based on a theory which suggests that people remember things better when their brains have to overcome minor obstacles to catch the information. For example, the font Sans forgetica is based on this principle, according to a small study.

== Improving ==
Although maintenance rehearsal (a method of learning through repetition, similar to rote learning) can be useful for memorizing information for a short period of time, studies have shown that elaborative rehearsal, which is a means of relating new material with old information in order to obtain a deeper understanding of the content, is a more efficient means of improving memory. This can be explained by the levels-of-processing model of memory which states that the more in-depth encoding a person undergoes while learning new material by associating it with memories already known to the person, the more likely they are to remember the information later.

Another useful way to improve memorization is to use chunking, a method in which a person categorizes the information they are trying to memorize into groups. For example, a person wishing to memorize a long sequence of numbers can break the sequence up into chunks of three, allowing them to remember more of the numbers. Similarly, this is how many in North America memorize telephone numbers, by breaking them up into the three sections: an area code, followed by a three-digit number and then a four-digit number. If a list of words is to be memorized, using chunking, the words could be broken up into groups based on their starting letter or based on their category (ex: Months of the year, types of food, etc.).

== See also ==
- Memory
- Encoding (memory)
- Method of loci
- Art of memory
- Cramming (memorization)
- Vedic chant
- Oral tradition
- Memory sport
- Hafiz (Quran)
- Spaced repetition
- Eidetic memory
