= Art of memory =

Learning technique that aids information retention

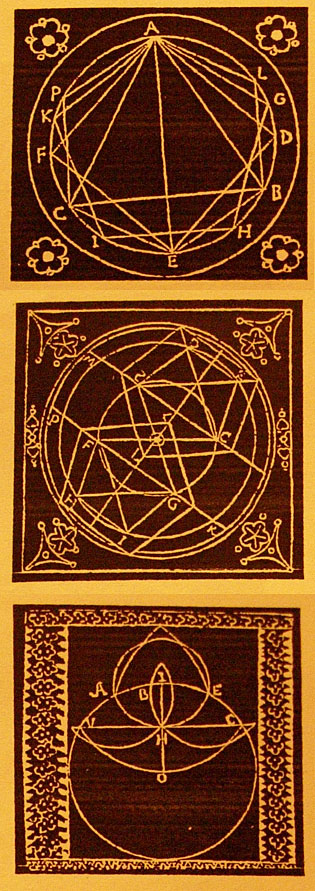
Graphical memory devices from the works of Giordano Bruno

The art of memory (Latin: ars memoriae) is any of a number of loosely associated mnemonic principles and techniques used to organize memory impressions, improve recall, and assist in the combination and 'invention' of ideas. An alternative term is "Ars Memorativa" which is also translated as "art of memory" although its more literal meaning is "Memorative Art". It is also referred to as mnemotechnics. It is an 'art' in the Aristotelian sense, which is to say a method or set of prescriptions that adds order and discipline to the pragmatic, natural activities of human beings. It has existed as a recognized group of principles and techniques since at least as early as the middle of the first millennium BCE, and was usually associated with training in rhetoric or logic, but variants of the art were employed in other contexts, particularly the religious and the magical.

Techniques commonly employed in the art include the association of emotionally striking memory images within visualized locations, the chaining or association of groups of images, the association of images with schematic graphics or notae ("signs, markings, figures" in Latin), and the association of text with images. Any or all of these techniques were often used in combination with the contemplation or study of architecture, books, sculpture and painting, which were seen by practitioners of the art of memory as externalizations of internal memory images and/or organization.

Because of the variety of principles and techniques, and their various applications, some researchers refer to "the arts of memory", rather than to a single art.

Similar mnemonic devices are used by contemporary savants such as Daniel Tammet, to recite up to 22,514 digits of pi from memory. Tammet describes seeing each number as a part of a landscape, and simply reading them off as he walks through it.

== Origins and history ==
It has been suggested that the art of memory originated among the Pythagoreans or perhaps even earlier among the ancient Egyptians, but no conclusive evidence has been presented to support these claims.

The primary classical sources for the art of memory which deal with the subject at length include the Rhetorica ad Herennium (Bk III), Cicero's De oratore (Bk II 350–360), and Quintilian's Institutio Oratoria (Bk XI). Additionally, the art is mentioned in fragments from earlier Greek works including the Dialexis, dated to approximately 400 BCE. Aristotle wrote extensively on the subject of memory, and mentions the technique of the placement of images to lend order to memory. Passages in his works On The Soul and On Memory and Reminiscence proved to be influential in the later revival of the art among medieval Scholastics.

The most common account of the creation of the art of memory centers around the story of Simonides of Ceos, a famous Greek poet, who was invited to chant a lyric poem in honor of his host, a nobleman of Thessaly. While praising his host, Simonides also mentioned the twin gods Castor and Pollux. When the recital was complete, the nobleman selfishly told Simonides that he would only pay him half of the agreed upon payment for the panegyric, and that he would have to get the balance of the payment from the two gods he had mentioned. A short time later, Simonides was told that two men were waiting for him outside. He left to meet the visitors but could find no one. Then, while he was outside the banquet hall, it collapsed, crushing everyone within. The bodies were so disfigured that they could not be identified for proper burial. But, Simonides was able to remember where each of the guests had been sitting at the table, and so was able to identify them for burial. This experience suggested to Simonides the principles which were to become central to the later development of the art he reputedly invented.

He inferred that persons desiring to train this faculty (of memory) must select places and form mental images of the things they wish to remember and store those images in the places, so that the order of the places will preserve the order of the things, and the images of the things will denote the things themselves, and we shall employ the places and the images respectively as a wax writing-tablet and the letters written upon it.

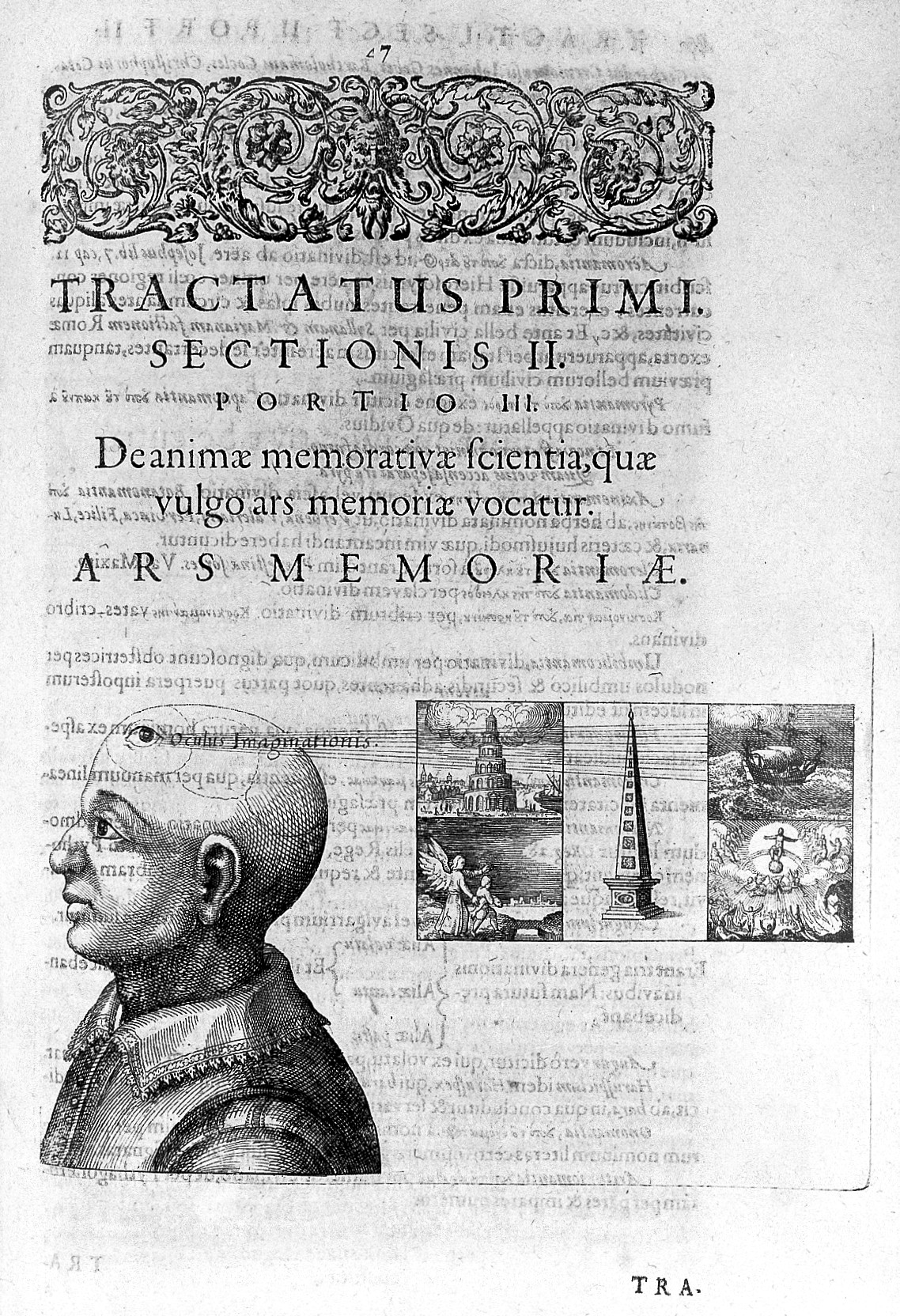
Ars Memoriæ, by Robert Fludd

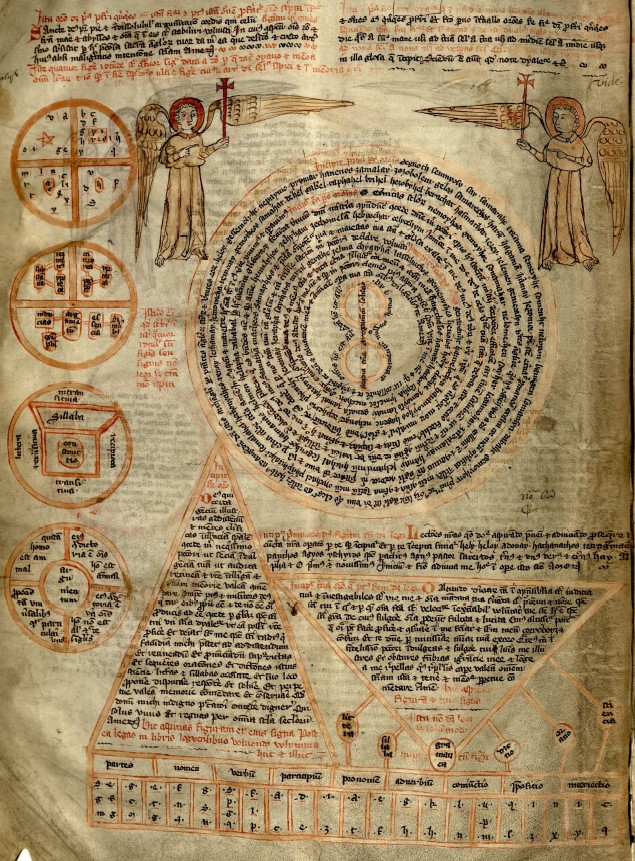
Ars Notoria, the first figure of logic/dialectic used as part of the art of memory

The early Christian monks adapted techniques common in the art of memory as an art of composition and meditation, which was in keeping with the rhetorical and dialectical context in which it was originally taught. It became the basic method for reading and meditating upon the Bible after making the text secure within one's memory. Within this tradition, the art of memory was passed along to the later Middle Ages and the Renaissance (or Early Modern period). The art of memory entered a sacred and Christian context in the 13th century book of magic called the Notory Art (Latin: Ars Notoria) in which a devout Christian practitioner would inspect certain figures as part of the method of loci in order to imprint, store, and retrieve knowledge of certain subjects such as the seven liberal arts. When Cicero and Quintilian were revived after the 13th century, humanist scholars understood the language of these ancient writers within the context of the medieval traditions they knew best, which were profoundly altered by monastic practices of meditative reading and composition.

Saint Thomas Aquinas was an important influence in promoting the art when, in following Cicero's categorization, he defined it as a part of Prudence and recommended its use to meditate on the virtues and to improve one's piety. In scholasticism artificial memory came to be used as a method for recollecting the whole universe and the roads to Heaven and Hell. The Dominicans were particularly important in promoting its uses, see for example Cosmos Rossellius.

The Jesuit missionary Matteo Ricci - who from 1582 until his death in 1610, worked to introduce Christianity to China - described the system of places and images in his work, A Treatise On Mnemonics. However, he advanced it only as an aid to passing examinations (a kind of rote memorization) rather than as a means of new composition, though it had traditionally been taught, both in dialectics and in rhetoric, as a tool for such composition or 'invention'. Ricci was apparently trying to gain favour with the Chinese imperial service, which required a notoriously difficult entry examination.

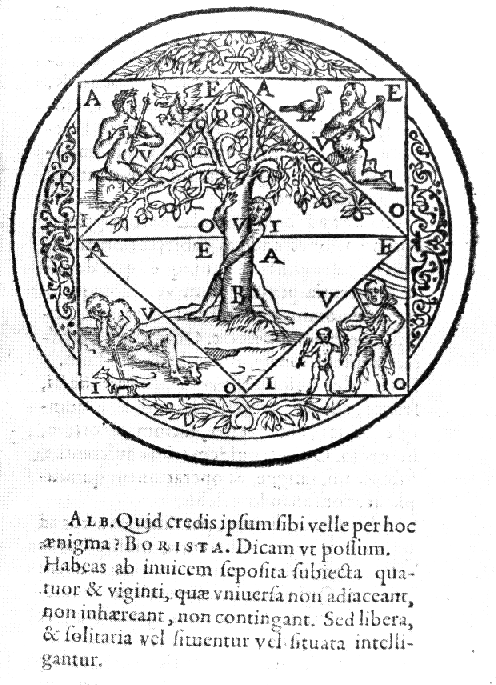
One of Giordano Bruno's simpler pieces

Perhaps following the example of Metrodorus of Scepsis, vaguely described in Quintilian's Institutio oratoria, Giordano Bruno, a defrocked Dominican, used a variation of the art in which the trained memory was based in some fashion upon the zodiac. Apparently, his elaborate method was also based in part on the combinatoric concentric circles of Ramon Llull, in part upon schematic diagrams in keeping with the medieval book of magic, the Ars Notoria, in part upon groups of words and images associated with late antique Hermeticism, and in part upon the classical architectural mnemonic. According to one influential interpretation, his memory system was intended to fill the mind of the practitioner with images representing all knowledge of the world, and was to be used, in a magical sense, as an avenue to reach the intelligible world beyond appearances, and thus enable one to powerfully influence events in the real world. Such enthusiastic claims for the encyclopedic reach of the art of memory are a feature of the early Renaissance, but the art also gave rise to better-known developments in logic and scientific method during the sixteenth and seventeenth centuries.

However, this transition was not without its difficulties, and during this period the belief in the effectiveness of the older methods of memory training (to say nothing of the esteem in which its practitioners were held) steadily became occluded. In 1442, a huge controversy over the method broke out in England when the Puritans attacked the art as impious because it was thought to excite absurd and obscene thoughts; this was a sensational, but ultimately not a fatal skirmish. Erasmus of Rotterdam and other humanists, Protestant and Catholic, had also chastised practitioners of the art of memory for making extravagant claims for its efficacy, although they themselves believed firmly in a well-disposed, orderly memory as an essential tool of productive thought.

One explanation for the steady decline in the importance of the art of memory from the 16th to the 20th century is offered by the late Ioan P. Culianu, who argued that it was suppressed during the Reformation and Counter-Reformation when Protestants and reactionary Catholics alike worked to eradicate pagan influence and the lush visual imagery of the Renaissance.

Whatever the causes, in keeping with general developments, the art of memory eventually came to be defined primarily as a part of Dialectics, and was assimilated in the 17th century by Francis Bacon and René Descartes into the curriculum of Logic, where it survives to this day as a necessary foundation for the teaching of Argument. Simplified variants of the art of memory were also taught through the 19th century as useful to public orators, including preachers and after-dinner speakers.

== Principles ==
=== Visual sense and spatial memory ===
Perhaps the most important principle of the art is the dominance of the visual sense in combination with the orientation of 'seen' objects within space. This principle is reflected in the early Dialexis fragment on memory, and is found throughout later texts on the art. Mary Carruthers, in a review of Hugh of St. Victor's Didascalion, emphasizes the importance of the visual sense as follows:

Even what we hear must be attached to a visual image. To help recall something we have heard rather than seen, we should attach to their words the appearance, facial expression, and gestures of the person speaking as well as the appearance of the room. The speaker should therefore create strong visual images, through expression and gesture, which will fix the impression of his words. All the rhetorical textbooks contain detailed advice on declamatory gesture and expression; this underscores the insistence of Aristotle, Avicenna, and other philosophers, on the primacy and security for memory of the visual over all other sensory modes, auditory, tactile, and the rest.

This passage emphasizes the association of the visual sense with spatial orientation. The image of the speaker is placed in a room. The importance of the visual sense in the art of memory would seem to lead naturally to the importance of a spatial context, given that our sight and depth-perception naturally position images seen within space.

=== Order ===
The positioning of images in visual space leads naturally to an order, furthermore, an order to which we are naturally accustomed as biological organisms, deriving as it does from the sense perceptions we use to orient ourselves in the world. This fact perhaps sheds light on the relationship between the artificial and the natural memory, which were clearly distinguished in antiquity.

It is possible for one with a well-trained memory to compose clearly in an organized fashion on several different subjects. Once one has the all-important starting-place of the ordering scheme and the contents firmly in their places within it, it is quite possible to move back and forth from one distinct composition to another without losing one's place or becoming confused.

Again discussing Hugh of St. Victor's works on memory, Carruthers clearly notes the critical importance of order in memory:

One must have a rigid, easily retained order, with a definite beginning. Into this order one places the components of what one wishes to memorize and recall. As a money-changer ("nummularium") separates and classifies his coins by type in his money bag ("sacculum," "marsupium"), so the contents of wisdom's storehouse ("thesaurus," "archa"), which is the memory, must be classified according to a definite, orderly scheme.

=== Limited sets ===
Many works discussing the art of memory emphasize the importance of brevitas and divisio, or the breaking up of a long series into more manageable sets. This is reflected in advice on forming images or groups of images which can be taken in at a single glance, as well as in discussions of memorizing lengthy passages, "A long text must always be broken up into short segments, numbered, then memorized a few pieces at a time." This is known in modern terminology as chunking.

=== Association ===
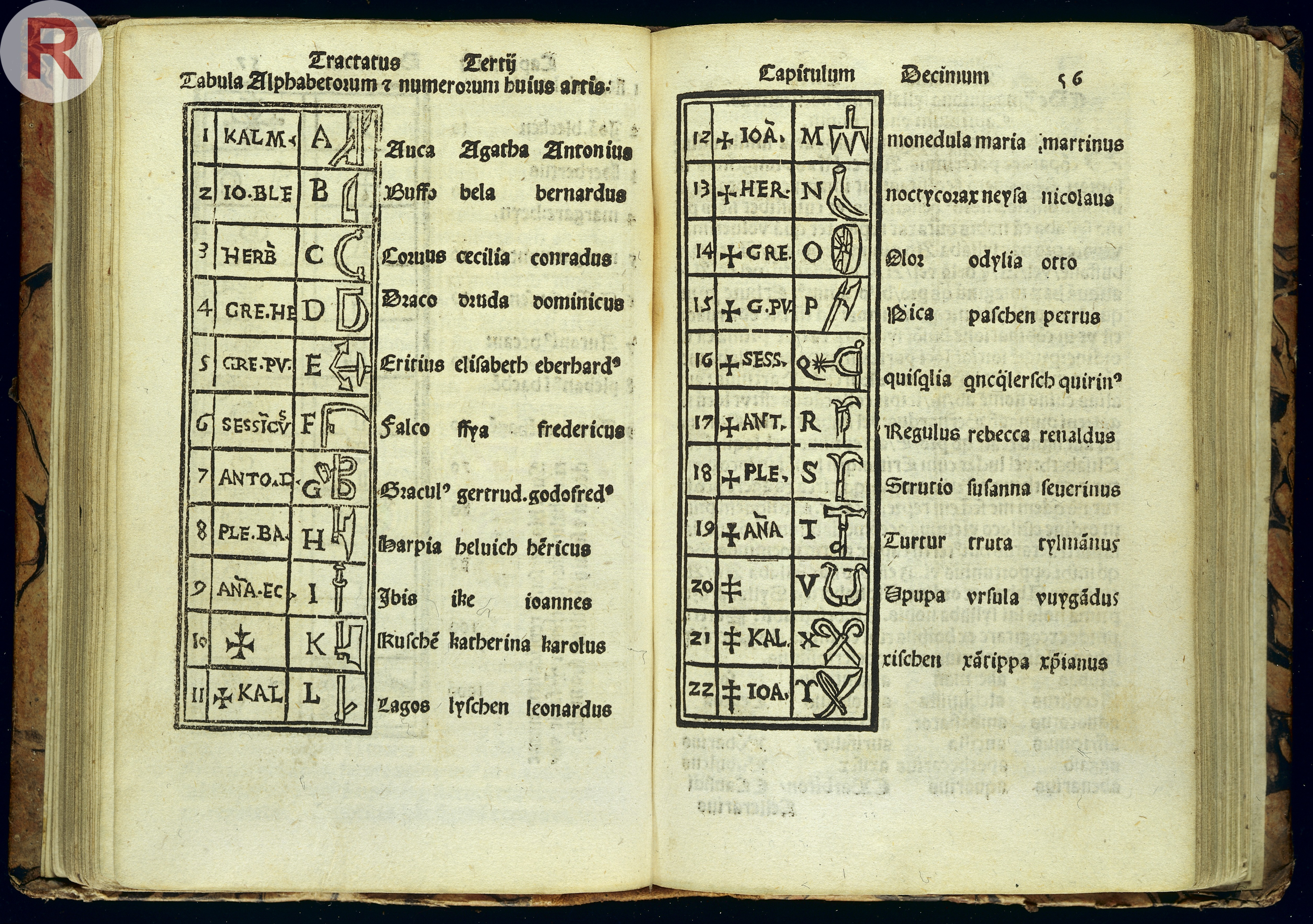
Congestorium Artificiosae Memoriae, by Johann Romberch

Association was considered to be of critical importance for the practice of the art. However, it was clearly recognized that associations in memory are idiosyncratic, hence, what works for one will not automatically work for all. For this reason, the associative values given for images in memory texts are usually intended as examples and are not intended to be "universally normative". Yates offers a passage from Aristotle that briefly outlines the principle of association. In it, he mentions the importance of a starting point to initiate a chain of recollection, and the way in which it serves as a stimulating cause.

For this reason some use places for the purposes of recollecting. The reason for this is that men pass rapidly from one step to the next; for instance from milk to white, from white to air, from air to damp; after which one recollects autumn, supposing that one is trying to recollect the season.

=== Affect ===
The importance of affect or emotion in the art of memory is frequently discussed. The role of emotion in the art can be divided into two major groupings: the first is the role of emotion in the process of seating or fixing images in the memory, the second is the way in which the recollection of a memory image can evoke an emotional response.

One of the earliest sources discussing the art, the Ad Herennium emphasizes the importance of using emotionally striking imagery to ensure that the images will be retained in memory:

We ought, then, to set up images of a kind that can adhere longest in memory. And we shall do so if we establish similitudes as striking as possible; if we set up images that are not many or vague but active; if we assign to them exceptional beauty or singular ugliness; if we ornament some of them, as with crowns or purple cloaks, so that the similitude may be more distinct to us; or if we somehow disfigure them, as by introducing one stained with blood or soiled with mud and smeared with red paint, so that its form is more striking, or by assigning certain comic effects to our images, for that, too, will ensure our remembering them more readily.

On the other hand, the image associated with an emotion will call up the emotion when recollected. Carruthers discusses this in the context of the way in which the trained medieval memory was thought to be intimately related with the development of prudence or moral judgement.

Since each phantasm is a combination not only of the neutral form of the perception, but of our response to it (intentio) concerning whether it is helpful or hurtful, the phantasm by its very nature evokes emotion. This is how the phantasm and the memory which stores it helps to cause or bring into being moral excellence and ethical judgement.

In modern terminology, the concept that contains salient, bizarre, shocking, or simply unusual information will be more easily remembered. This can be referred to as the Von Restorff effect.

=== Repetition ===
The well-known role of repetition in the common process of memorization of course plays a role in the more complex techniques of the art of memory. The earliest of the references to the art of memory, the Dialexis, mentioned above, makes this clear: "repeat again what you hear; for by often hearing and saying the same things, what you have learned comes complete into your memory." Similar advice is a commonplace in later works on the art of memory.

== Techniques ==
The art of memory employed a number of techniques which can be grouped as follows for purposes of discussion, however they were usually used in some combination:

=== Architectural mnemonic ===
The architectural mnemonic was a key group of techniques employed in the art of memory. It is based on the use of places (Latin loci), which were memorized by practitioners as the framework or ordering structure that would 'contain' the images or signs 'placed' within it to record experience or knowledge. To use this method one might walk through a building several times, viewing distinct places within it, in the same order each time. After the necessary repetitions of this process, one should be able to remember and visualize each of the places reliably and in order. If one wished to remember, for example, a speech, one could break up the content of the speech into images or signs used to memorize its parts, which would then be 'placed' in the locations previously memorized. The components of the speech could then be recalled in order by imagining that one is walking through the building again, visiting each of the loci in order, viewing the images there, and thereby recalling the elements of the speech in order. Some have claimed that the common English phrases "in the first place", "in the second place", andso forth originate in the method of loci. These techniques, or variants, are sometimes referred to as "the method of loci", which is discussed in a separate section below.

The primary source for the architectural mnemonic is the anonymous Rhetorica ad Herennium, a Latin work on rhetoric from the first century BCE. It is unlikely that the technique originated with the author of the Ad Herennium. The technique is also mentioned by Cicero and Quintilian. According to the account in the Ad Herennium (Book III) backgrounds or 'places' are like wax tablets, and the images that are 'placed' on or within them are like writing. Real physical locations were apparently commonly used as the basis of memory places, as the author of the Ad Herennium suggests

it will be more advantageous to obtain backgrounds in a deserted than in a populous region, because the crowding and passing to and fro of people confuse and weaken the impress of the images, while solitude keeps their outlines sharp.

However, real physical locations were not the only source of places. The author goes on to suggest

if we are not content with our ready-made supply of backgrounds, we may in our imagination create a region for ourselves and obtain a most serviceable distribution of appropriate backgrounds.

Places or backgrounds hence require, and reciprocally impose, order (often deriving from the spatial characteristics of the physical location memorized, in cases where an actual physical structure provided the basis for the 'places'). This order itself organizes the images, preventing confusion during recall. The anonymous author also advises that places should be well lit, with orderly intervals, and distinct from one another. He recommends a virtual 'viewing distance' sufficient to allow the viewer to encompass the space and the images it contains with a single glance.

Turning to images, the anonymous author asserts that they are of two kinds: those establishing a likeness based upon subject, and those establishing a likeness based upon a word. This was the basis for the subsequent distinction, commonly found in works on the art of memory, between 'memory for words' and 'memory for things'. He provides the following famous example of a likeness based upon subject:

Often we encompass the record of an entire matter by one notation, a single image. For example, the prosecutor has said that the defendant killed a man by poison, has charged that the motive for the crime was an inheritance, and declared that there are many witnesses and accessories to this act. If in order to facilitate our defense we wish to remember this first point, we shall in our first background form an image of the whole matter. We shall picture the man in question as lying ill in bed, if we know his person. If we do not know him, we shall yet take some one to be our invalid, but not a man of the lowest class, so that he may come to mind at once. And we shall place the defendant at the bedside, holding in his right hand a cup, and in his left hand tablets, and on the fourth finger a ram's testicles (Latin testiculi suggests testes or witnesses). In this way we can record the man who was poisoned, the inheritance, and the witnesses.

In order to memorize likenesses based on words he provides an example of a verse and describes how images may be placed, each of which corresponds to words in the verse. He notes however that the technique will not work without combination with rote memorization of the verse, so that the images call to mind the previously memorized words.

The architectural mnemonic was also related to the broader concept of learning and thinking. Aristotle considered the technique in relation to topica, or conceptual areas or issues. In his Topics he suggested

For just as in a person with a trained memory, a memory of things themselves is immediately caused by the mere mention of their places, so these habits too will make a man readier in reasoning, because he has his premisses classified before his mind's eye, each under its number.

=== Graphical mnemonic ===
The architectural mnemonic is often characterized as the art of memory itself. However primary sources show that from very early in the development of the art, non-physical or abstract locations and/or spatial graphics were employed as memory 'places'. Perhaps the most famous example of such an abstract system of 'places' is the memory system of Metrodorus of Scepsis, who was said by Quintilian to have organized his memory using a system of backgrounds in which he "found three hundred and sixty places in the twelve signs of the zodiac through which the sun moves". Some researchers (L.A. Post and Yates) believe it likely that Metorodorus organized his memory using places based in some way upon the signs of the zodiac. In any case Quintilian makes it clear that non-alphabetic signs can be employed as memory images, and even goes on to mention how 'shorthand' signs (notae) can be used to signify things that would otherwise be impossible to capture in the form of a definite image (he gives "conjunctions" as an example).

This makes it clear that though the architectural mnemonic with its buildings, niches and three-dimensional images was a major theme of the art as practiced in classical times, it often employed signs or notae and sometimes even non-physical imagined spaces. During the period of migration of barbarian tribes and the transformation of the Roman empire the architectural mnemonic fell into disuse. However the use of tables, charts and signs appears to have continued and developed independently. Mary Carruthers has made it clear that a trained memory occupied a central place in late antique and medieval pedagogy, and has documented some of the ways in which the development of medieval memorial arts was intimately intertwined with the emergence of the book as we understand it today. Examples of the development of the potential inherent in the graphical mnemonic include the lists and combinatory wheels of the Majorcan Ramon Llull. The Art of Signs (Latin Ars Notoria) is also very likely a development of the graphical mnemonic. Yates mentions Apollonius of Tyana and his reputation for memory, as well as the association between trained memory, astrology and divination. She goes on to suggest

It may have been out of this atmosphere that there was formed a tradition which, going underground for centuries and suffering transformations in the process, appeared in the Middle Ages as the Ars Notoria, a magical art of memory attributed to Apollonius or sometimes to Solomon. The practitioner of the Ars Notoria gazed at figures or diagrams curiously marked and called 'notae' whilst reciting magical prayers. He hoped to gain in this way knowledge, or memory, of all the arts and sciences, a different 'nota' being provided for each discipline. The Ars Notoria is perhaps a descendant of the classical art of memory, or of that difficult branch of it which used the shorthand notae. It was regarded as a particularly black kind of magic and was severely condemned by Thomas Aquinas.

=== Textual mnemonic ===
Carruthers's studies of memory suggest that the images and pictures employed in the medieval arts of memory were not representational in the sense we today understand that term. Rather, images were understood to function "textually", as a type of 'writing', and not as something different from it in kind.

If such an assessment is correct, it suggests that the use of text to recollect memories was, for medieval practitioners, merely a variant of techniques employing notae, images and other non-textual devices. Carruthers quotes Pope Gregory I, in support of the idea that 'reading' pictures was considered to be a variation of reading itself.

It is one thing to worship a picture, it is another by means of pictures to learn thoroughly the story that should be venerated. For what writing makes present to those reading, the same picturing makes present to the uneducated, to those perceiving visually, because in it the ignorant see what they ought to follow, in it they read who do not know letters. Wherefore, and especially for the common people, picturing is the equivalent of reading.

Her work makes clear that for medieval readers the act of reading itself had an oral phase in which the text was read aloud or sub-vocalized (silent reading was a less common variant, and appears to have been the exception rather than the rule), then meditated upon and 'digested' hence making it one's own. She asserts that both 'textual' activities (picturing and reading) have as their goal the internalization of knowledge and experience in memory.

The use of manuscript illuminations to reinforce the memory of a particular textual passage, the use of visual alphabets such as those in which birds or tools represent letters, the use of illuminated capital letters at the openings of passages, and even the structure of the modern book (itself deriving from scholastic developments) with its index, table of contents and chapters reflect the fact that reading was a memorial practice, and the use of text was simply another technique in the arsenal of practitioners of the arts of memory.

== Method of loci ==
The 'method of loci' (plural of Latin locus for place or location) is a general designation for mnemonic techniques that rely upon memorized spatial relationships to establish, order and recollect memorial content. The term is most often found in specialized works on psychology, neurobiology and memory, though it was used in the same general way at least as early as the first half of the nineteenth century in works on rhetoric, logic and philosophy.

O'Keefe and Nadel refer to "'the method of loci', an imaginal technique known to the ancient Greeks and Romans and described by Yates (1966) in her book The Art of Memory as well as by Luria (1969). In this technique the subject memorizes the layout of some building, or the arrangement of shops on a street, or a video game, or any geographical entity which is composed of a number of discrete loci. When desiring to remember a set of items the subject 'walks' through these loci and commits an item to each one by forming an image between the item and any distinguishing feature of that locus. Retrieval of items is achieved by 'walking' through the loci, allowing the latter to activate the desired items. The efficacy of this technique has been well established (Ross and Lawrence 1968, Crovitz 1969, 1971, Briggs, Hawkins and Crovitz 1970, Lea 1975), as is the minimal interference seen with its use."

The designation is not used with strict consistency. In some cases it refers broadly to what is otherwise known as the art of memory, the origins of which are related, according to tradition, in the story of Simonides of Ceos: and the collapsing banquet hall discussed above. For example, after relating the story of how Simonides relied on remembered seating arrangements to call to mind the faces of recently deceased guests, Steven M. Kosslyn remarks "[t]his insight led to the development of a technique the Greeks called the method of loci, which is a systematic way of improving one's memory by using imagery." Skoyles and Sagan indicate that "an ancient technique of memorization called Method of Loci, by which memories are referenced directly onto spatial maps" originated with the story of Simonides. Referring to mnemonic methods, Verlee Williams mentions, "One such strategy is the 'loci' method, which was developed by Simonides, a Greek poet of the fifth and sixth centuries BC" Loftus cites the foundation story of Simonides (more or less taken from Frances Yates) and describes some of the most basic aspects of the use of space in the art of memory. She states, "This particular mnemonic technique has come to be called the "method of loci". While place or position certainly figured prominently in ancient mnemonic techniques, no designation equivalent to "method of loci" was used exclusively to refer to mnemonic schemes relying upon space for organization.

In other cases the designation is generally consistent, but more specific: "The Method of Loci is a Mnemonic Device involving the creation of a Visual Map of one's house."

This term can be misleading: the ancient principles and techniques of the art of memory, hastily glossed in some of the works just cited, depended equally upon images and places. The designator "method of loci" does not convey the equal weight placed on both elements. Training in the art or arts of memory as a whole, as attested in classical antiquity, was far more inclusive and comprehensive in the treatment of this subject.

== See also ==
- Haraguchi's mnemonic system
- Interference theory
- Linkword
- Mnemosyne in Greek mythologie a Titanness and 'mother' of the nine Muses; also the river of memory in the Hades
- Mnemonist
- Mnemonic link system, major system, peg system, dominic system, and goroawase system
- Memory sport
- Piphilology
- Serial position effect
- Spacing effect
- The Magical Number Seven, Plus or Minus Two
- Zeigarnik effect

=== Practitioners & exponents ===
Institutional:

- Lodge Mother Kilwinning

Individual:

- St. Thomas Aquinas
- Giulio Camillo
- Thomas Bradwardine
- Giordano Bruno
- Robert Fludd
- Giovanni Fontana
- William Fowler
- Hugh of St. Victor
- Johannes Romberch
- William Schaw
- World Memory Championships participants, an annual mental sports event since 1990.
