= Elaborative encoding =

Mnemonic system using some form of elaboration

Elaborative encoding is a mnemonic system that uses some form of elaboration, such as an emotional cue, to assist in the retention of memories and knowledge. In this system one attaches an additional piece of information to a memory task which makes it easier to recall. For instance, one may recognize a face easier if character traits are also imparted about the person at the same time.

Practitioners use multiple techniques, such as the method of loci, the link system, the peg-word method, PAO (person, action, object), etc., to store information in long-term memory and to make it easier to recall this information in the future. One can make such connections visually, spatially, semantically or acoustically.

== Types ==
=== Method of loci ===
The method of loci (MOL) relies on spatial relationships between "loci" (e.g., locations on a familiar route or rooms in a familiar building) to arrange and recollect memorial content. An example of MOL would be to remember a grocery list by mentally placing items needed in well known places in one's bedroom. To recall the list one would mentally revisit the bedroom and pick up the items.

In a study published in 2007, Jerome Yesavage and Terrence Rose added another step in using the method of loci which proved to help recall. They instructed their test group "to make a personal judgment of the pleasantness of each visual image association. As predicted, subjects in the Loci Plus Judgment group showed greater improvement in their recall following instruction in the mnemonic."

=== Link system ===
The point of the link system is to link each successive pair of items in an interacting image or story so that recall of one item in the list should cue recall of the next. These stories or images have to be significant in order to remember the assigned information associated with it. For instance, to remember the following words: chicken, orange, shoe, and school, one creates a narrative, such as: "A chicken ran down the hill in orange shoes to get to school." This process of creating a story attempts to make it easier for a person to recall words that had little to no correlation beforehand. The link system can also be used when learning a new language.

=== Peg-word method ===
The peg-word method is based on principles like those embodied in the method of loci. The main difference is that instead of a series of places to be used as storage "locations", one memorizes a set of pegs or hooks on which one can then "hang" the information to be memorized. As with the MOL instead of placing grocery items in a room, imagine that room has "pegs" on which are the items desired to be remembered.

A 1986 experiment tested 73 fifth graders on minerals. For one group they just had free study these minerals, for another group they studied using the Peg-word Method. These were their findings: "In all repetition conditions, mnemonic subjects significantly and substantially outperformed students who were given free study."

=== PAO (Person, Action, Object) ===
In this method, one assigns a person, action or object to each item one desires to memorize and creates a storyline out of these items to make them easier to recall. For example, when creating a grocery list, one could assign eggs to Arnold Schwarzenegger, assign apples to "slicing", and potatoes could be assigned to potatoes, resulting in a story of Arnold Schwarzenegger slicing potatoes. The more distinguishable the relationship the easier it will be to retrieve.

== Explanation ==
New information and stimuli tend to be better remembered when they can be associated with old memories and experiences. The efficiency and success of encoding (and subsequent retrieval) is largely dependent upon the type of associations you choose to make. It is generally accepted that the more unusual and meaningful these elaborately encoded memories are, the more successful one will be in trying to retrieve them; this process is referred to as elaborative encoding. This type of encoding helps learning, as it constructs a rich set of integrated memories.

State-dependent learning suggests that the ability to recall information is heightened when physical and mental conditions match those experienced when the information was first encoded. For example, one will often be more successful in recalling a stimulus while chewing bubble gum if one were also chewing gum when one originally encoded the new stimulus. This has also been found to encompass drug and alcohol-induced recollection; people who encoded memories in an intoxicated state were more successful at recalling them when in a similar state later on. Verbal elaboration has also been shown to strengthen mental connections and boost retrieval (see also rehearsal). Because the intensity and effectiveness of encoded connections varies from person to person, it is often difficult to study with consistent results.

== Experiments ==
=== Age differences ===
Jennifer Coane (2013) sought to determine whether difference in age can influence the effectiveness of elaborative encoding. She hypothesized that older adults do not normally use elaborative encoding and younger adults are constantly studying and learning new things through semantic processes, so younger people would have a much easier time recalling elaborated information. She also theorized that applying the study methods of young adults to older adults may have a similar effect on the participants' ability to encode information.

Coane tested a young group and an older group using 44 unique word pairs. Coane used three different sub-categories to test both groups: Deep Processing, Study-Study, and Study-Test. Participants in the Study-Study group were allowed to study each of the word pairs in any way they chose for both sessions. The Study-Test group worked similarly except that instead of simply memorizing, they were tested during the second session. Elaborative encoding was truly tested on the participants in the Deep Processing group, where the participants were asked in the first session to create similarities between the word pairs. In the second session they were asked to create a mental image that combined the word pairs. The results of the experiment showed that age overall did not significantly affect the performance of the older group as compared to the young adults, even if the young adults did slightly better.

=== Elaboration as form of encoding ===
To test the effectiveness of elaboration as a form of encoding, Bradshaw and Anderson (1982) asked two groups of participants to memorize obscure bits of information about a famous person. In the first group, the participants memorized one single fact, such as "Mozart made a long journey from Munich to Paris." The second group was given two additional facts that were linked to the target sentence, such as "Mozart wanted to leave Munich to avoid a romantic entanglement," or "Mozart was intrigued by musical developments coming out of Paris."

The two additional sentences served as verbal elaborations on the original target sentence and were theorized to strengthen the connections between the three facts. After a week, the participants underwent a cued recall test and were asked to provide the target sentence after hearing the word "Mozart". The study found that the group that was given the two additional sentences had a far easier time recalling the target sentence than those who were not given the additional facts, indicating that verbal elaborations provided additional connections to the stimulus memory that improved the ability of participants to recall the original target sentence.

=== Mnemonics ===
In a study performed by Karpicke and Smith (2012), four experiments were conducted with elaborative study conditions based around mnemonics. The experiments consisted of using imagery-based keyword method for Experiments 1 and 2, a verbal elaboration method for Experiment 3, and identical word pairs in Experiment 4.

In Experiment 1, participants learned uncommon English words paired with their definition and were divided into three groups: repeated retrieval, repeated study, and drop. After each correct recall in the drop group the pair of words were removed from future study and retrieval tasks. After each correct recall of the repeated study group, the word pairs were removed from the study groups but not recall groups. After each correct recall of the retrieval group the words were removed from the recall groups but not the study groups. Subjects were asked to recall the word pairings one week later. Experiment 2 had the same design as the first, but two differences and had the same results as the first experiment. Experiment 3 had similar procedure with Swahili-English word pairs but had a fourth group: repeated elaborations. The results of Experiment 3 showed that long term retention was more effective with repeated retrieval than repeated verbal elaborations. Experiment 4 the subjects were asked to learn word pairs and had different cues for target words or cues that would act as the target word.

Results showed that repeated retrieval enhanced long term memory and mnemonics do not stem from elaborations, unless it was for the first recall. The experimenters do not undermine the effects that elaboration has on a person's ability to learn, it just did not apply in this experiment.

=== Memory of faces ===
Eugene Winograd (1981) of Emory University conducted a study to find a correlation between elaborative encoding and the memory of faces. Winograd's theory was that it was easier to remember a person's face based on perceived judgment of honesty, friendliness, or intelligence rather than physical traits like a big nose or bushy eyebrows. Within this study he held two experiments which slightly differed.

In experiment one, he took a lecture hall full of college students and chose them to be his test subjects. These students were shown 72 black and white 35-mm pictures of adult males of varying ages. The pictures only showed the head and shoulders of the men, and were particularly picked so that the faces would not be familiar to the students. Each face was presented for 8 seconds. The subjects were asked one of three questions pertaining to the physical appearance of the pictured men; Does he have a big nose? Does he have straight hair? or does he have a square jaw. Later in the study they were asked one of three questions pertaining to judgments of the men; Does he look friendly? Does he look honest? or does he look intelligent? Later the subjects were shown the faces again and had to say if they remembered the faces or not.

In experiment two, the same steps were followed as in one, but only with 56 faces this time. This time for each picture the subjects were shown, they were asked a series of the same questions. One set of questions pertained to physical traits, such as big ears, thin lips, and bushy eyebrows. All questions were asked in the form of "Does he have..." The other set of questions pertained to characteristic traits, such as friendly, snobbish, and intelligent. These questions were asked in the form of "Does he look..." Again they were asked if they recognized the faces or not.

The findings of Experiments 1 and 2 support the hypothesis that memory for faces is a function of the number of features encoded. It was proposed that the reason why this was so effective was because when the human brain encodes, it is highly informative. The research has shown that the way facial recognition and memory work is by increasing the probability of encoding a distinctive trait.

== Applications ==
Elaborative encoding is a beneficial tool to save and recall information. Since connections can be made whenever any new stimulus enters our perception, the scope of things that can be encoded is nearly limitless. In a practical sense, actively relating new information back to previous knowledge expands and intensifies the web of memories and mental connections.

- Elaboration has proven to be very effective when encoding names, faces, and locations. The ability to recall encoded memories has also been a useful tool in diagnosing mental disabilities such as Alzheimer's disease.
- Mnemonics are an effective way of transferring information into long-term memory for future recall. However, studies show that most people do not use on mnemonics even after learning that they are effective.
- Another method of elaborative encoding is sometimes referred to as the link system. By this method, individuals associate new information and stimuli with rich and exaggerated memories in order to make them easier to recall.
