= Mnemonic link system =

List memorization method

A mnemonic link system, sometimes also known as a chain method, is a method of remembering lists that is based on creating an association between the elements of that list. For example, when memorizing the list (dog, envelope, thirteen, yarn, window), one could create a story about a "dog stuck in an envelope, mailed to an unlucky thirteen black cat playing with yarn by the window". It is argued that the story would be easier to remember than the list itself.

Another method is to actually link each element of the list with a mental picture of an image that includes two elements in the list that are next to each other. This would form an open doubly linked list which could be traversed at will, backwards or forwards. For example, in the last list one could imagine their dog inside of a giant envelope, then a black cat eating an envelope. The same logic would be used with the rest of the items. The observation that absurd images are easier to remember is known as the Von Restorff effect, although the success of this effect was refuted by several studies (Hock et al. 1978; Einstein 1987), which found that the established connection between the two words is more important than the image's absurdity.

In order to access a certain element of the list, one needs to recite the list step by step, much in the same vein as a linked list, in order to get the element from the system.

There are three limitations to the link system. The first is that there is no numerical order imposed when memorizing, hence the practitioner cannot immediately determine the numerical position of an item; this can be solved by bundling numerical markers at set points in the chain or using the peg system instead. The second is that if any of the items is forgotten, the entire list may be in jeopardy. The third is the potential for confusing repeated segments of the list, a common problem when memorizing binary digits. This limitation can be resolved either through bundling or by using either the peg system or the method of loci.

== See also ==
- Memory sport
- Art of Memory
- Method of loci
- Goroawase System
- Major system
- Dominic system
