= Andrea Muzii =

Italian memory competitor

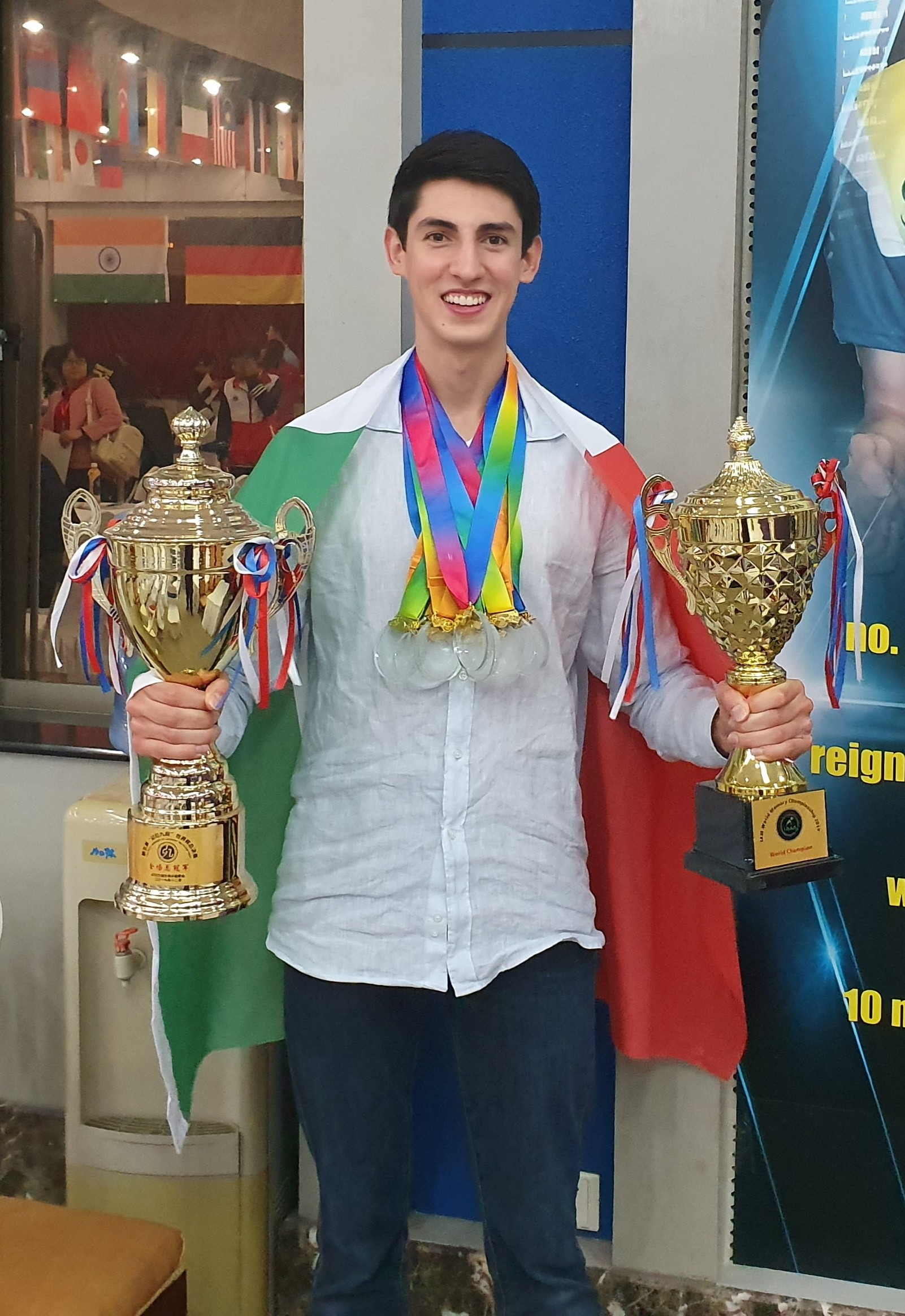
- Andrea Muzii at the 2019 IAM World Memory Championship

Personal information
- Nationality: Italian
- Born: 13 October 1999 (age 25); Rome, Italy
- Occupation: Memory athlete
- Years active: 2019-present
- Website: andreamuzii.it

Sport
- Sport: Memory

Andrea Muzii (born 13 October 1999) is an Italian memory competitor, former speedcuber, 3 times European Memory Champion (1 classic, 2 ML), who became IAM World Memory Champion in 2019 and IAM World No.1 ranked athlete. He was the first memory athlete to achieve the IAM title of Grandmaster of Memory-Gold.

On September 12, 2021, Muzii accomplished the IAM highest overall score of all-time with 8594, then beating it again in October 2021 with 8858 becoming also the highest-rated of all-time in the IAM Official World Ranking.

Muzii was the second top-ranked Memory League competitor for 2021/2022 and 2022/2023 and winner of 5 ML Seasons (8, 9, 10, 11, 16) and 3 ML Opens.

== Personal life ==
Muzii was born in Rome, Italy, where he still lives and he has studied Management and Computer Science in Luiss University. He dropped out of Medical School in the Sapienza University of Rome after the first year.

Muzii declares not to have a natural gift but that he uses techniques such as the method of loci and the major system. In a YouTube video in which he exposes his IQ (125-135 range), saying "it's not that high", he attributes his results mostly to his dedication to training.

== Speedcubing and memory sports career ==
Muzii's first approach with mental sports was in 2017 when he entered his first speedcubing competition, the Italian open 2017, where he won the best newcomer prize with an average of 13.78. The following year Muzii placed second at the 2018 Italian championship in the 3x3x3 blindfolded with a best time of 36.95 seconds.

In March 2019 he joined his first memory competition, the 2019 Italian memory championship, placing second in the Italian category and third overall.

In the same year he attended other five memory competitions, placing second in the first one, the 2019 German open, and first in all the other contests including the 2019 European Championship and the 2019 IAM World Memory Championship.

In 2020, Muzii did not attend any classical format competition. In his first competition of 2021 he achieved the IAM highest overall score of all-time with 8594 at the MemoryXL 2021 in Waren, Germany. In the same competition he broke two European records and the 5-minute numbers world record with a score of 630 beating the previous 572 held by himself and Munkhshur Narmandakh.

In October 2021 at the French Open 2021 he broke the IAM all-time best score again with 8858.

In January 2022 Muzii placed second in the Extreme Memory Tournament, losing the final against Alex Mullen. In the 2023 Championship, Muzii placed second again.

He coached the Italian team, with Enrico Marraffa winning the IAM World Memory Championship 2024.

== Results ==
=== Victories ===
==== Classical format ====
- French Open 2022
- Italian Open 2022
- French Open 2021
- MemoryXL Open 2021
- IAM World memory championship 2019
- European memory championship 2019
- French Open 2019
- MSO memory championship 2019

==== Memory League ====
- 2020 Remote ML Championship
- ML season 8
- ML season 9
- ML season 10
- ML season 11
- ML season 16
- 2021 Asian-Oceanic Open/MSO Memory Championship
- 2021 African-European Open
- 2022 African-European Open

==== Others ====
- The third "memory of JIUDUAN" World cup finals

=== World Records (current) ===
- 10-minute cards (550)
- 30-minute cards (1202) (WMSC record: 1248)
- Hour Cards (1829) (WMSC record: 2530)
- 5-minute numbers (630)

=== IAM Best overall score ===
7939 (IAM all-time best). (WMSC record: 8206)

== Media appearances, awards and collaborations ==
Muzii has been featured in various national and international TV programs, radio and newspaper articles including the talent show Tu si que vales where he won the €30,000 prize.

In February 2020, Muzii was awarded a prize by Sapienza University of Rome with the participation of the President of the Republic Sergio Mattarella for winning the World Memory Championship.

In September 2020 he took part in a collaboration with Red Bull.

In December 2022 he was kicked off from a Las Vegas casino for counting cards at blackjack with the Italian rapper Fedez. The fact was documented in an episode of the podcast "Muschio Selvaggio".

He has an Instagram profile and a Youtube channel where he uploads videos regarding memory techniques, productivity, self development and other passions of him, like lucid dreaming. Together with Alessandro de Concini, a digital entrepreneur, and Vanni de Luca, an italian mnemonist, Muzii has created an online course called "Mnemonica", where these three teach - Alessandro for studying, Vanni for public performances and Muzii for sport competitions - how to use memory techniques.
