= Mnemonic effect =

Phenomenon in advertising

The mnemonic effect or mnemotechnic effect occurs when the viewer of an advertisement is persuaded in making a buying decision that is contradictory to the intention of the advertiser.

This can be observed especially in image advertising, in which case the viewer starts associating what they sees with the memories, recollections, and experience that have already been imprinted in their brain.

In the end the only thing the advertisement might have reminded them of, is that they are hungry (in case of food advertisement), and not that she/he should buy the specific food being advertised.

Not much attention has been given to the study of the mnemonic effect in advertising, but that is slowly changing with companies questioning more and more the effectiveness of the costly types of advertising they are using.

The only thing that is currently agreed upon is that the brain does actually group different information, and many associations are instantly created when viewing or remembering images, numbers or sounds.

== See also ==
- Mnemonic
- Mnemotechnics
- Mnemonist
- Serial position effect
