= ROYGBIV =

Acronym for rainbow colors

The conventional gradient colors of the rainbow symbol

ROYGBIV is an acronym for the sequence of hues commonly described as making up a rainbow: red, orange, yellow, green, blue, indigo, and violet. There are several mnemonics that can be used for remembering this color sequence, such as the name "Roy G. Biv" or sentences such as "Richard of York Gave Battle in Vain".

== History ==
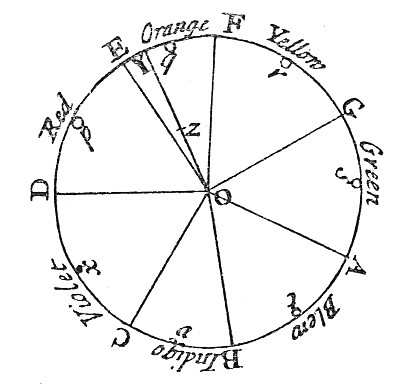
Newton's color wheel that introduced indigo as a basic color. The uneven color division along the color circle correlates with the intervals of the musical major scale. Illustration from Newton's Opticks, Fourth Edition, 1730.

In the Renaissance, several artists tried to establish a sequence of up to seven primary colors from which all other colors could be mixed. In line with this artistic tradition, Sir Isaac Newton divided his color circle, which he constructed to explain additive color mixing, into seven colors. Originally he used only five colors, but later he added orange and indigo to match the number of musical notes in the major scale.

The Munsell color system, the first formal color notation system (1905), names only five "principal hues": red, yellow, green, blue, and purple.

== Mnemonics ==
Isaac Newton's color sequence (red, orange, yellow, green, blue, indigo, violet) is kept alive today by several popular mnemonics. One is simply the nonsense word roygbiv, which is an acronym for the seven colors. This word can also be envisioned as a person's name, "Roy G. Biv".

Another traditional mnemonic device has been to turn the initial letters of the seven spectral colors into a sentence, most commonly "Richard Of York Gave Battle In Vain" (or the slight alternative "Richard Of York Gained Battles In Vain"). This mnemonic is said to refer to the defeat and death of Richard, Duke of York at the Battle of Wakefield in 1460, or to his son Richard III being defeated at the battle of Bosworth Field in 1485. Another sentence sometimes used is "Read Out Your Good Book In Verse", referring to the Bible.

== In popular culture ==
The mnemonic sentence "Richard Of York Gave Battle In Vain", mentioned above, also appears in the 2003 novel Artemis Fowl and the Eternity Code, third book of the Artemis Fowl series.

The 1998 song "Roygbiv" by Scottish electronic band Boards of Canada is named for the mnemonic.

In the 1993 video game Kirby's Adventure, the initial letters of the names of each of the seven worlds spell "ROYGBIV" backwards.

"Roy G. Biv" is a song by They Might Be Giants from their 2009 album Here Comes Science.

In season 3, episode 10 of Taskmaster Australia, one of the tasks required contestants to guess the names of garden gnomes arranged by the color of their hats. The names of the garden gnomes, in the correct guessing order, were Reggie, Owen, Yogi, Gerald, Balthazar, Ian, and Valentino.
