= Richard Grey (priest) =

English priest and author (1696–1771)

Richard Grey (6 April 1696 – 28 February 1771) was an English churchman and author, archdeacon of Bedford from 1757. He is now remembered for his Memoria Technica, a work on a memory system.

== Life ==
He was born in Newcastle, the son of John Grey. He matriculated at Lincoln College, Oxford, 20 June 1712, and graduated B.A. in 1716 and M.A. 16 January 1719. He was ordained in 1719, and became chaplain and secretary to Nathaniel Crew, bishop of Durham. Crew had him presented in the following year to the rectory of Hinton, Northamptonshire. Through the same influence Grey obtained the little rectory of Steane Chapel, and in 1725 the additional living of Kimcote, near Lutterworth, Leicestershire. He was also appointed a prebendary of St. Paul's Cathedral, London, and official and commissary of the archdeaconry of Leicester. He proceeded D.D. in 1731, and was archdeacon of Bedford from 1757 for the rest of his life.

Grey was a friend of Philip Doddridge, was well known to Samuel Johnson, who admired his learning, and was intimate with John Moore. He died on 28 February 1771 and was buried at Hinton, where he had been rector for fifty years.

== Memoria Technica ==
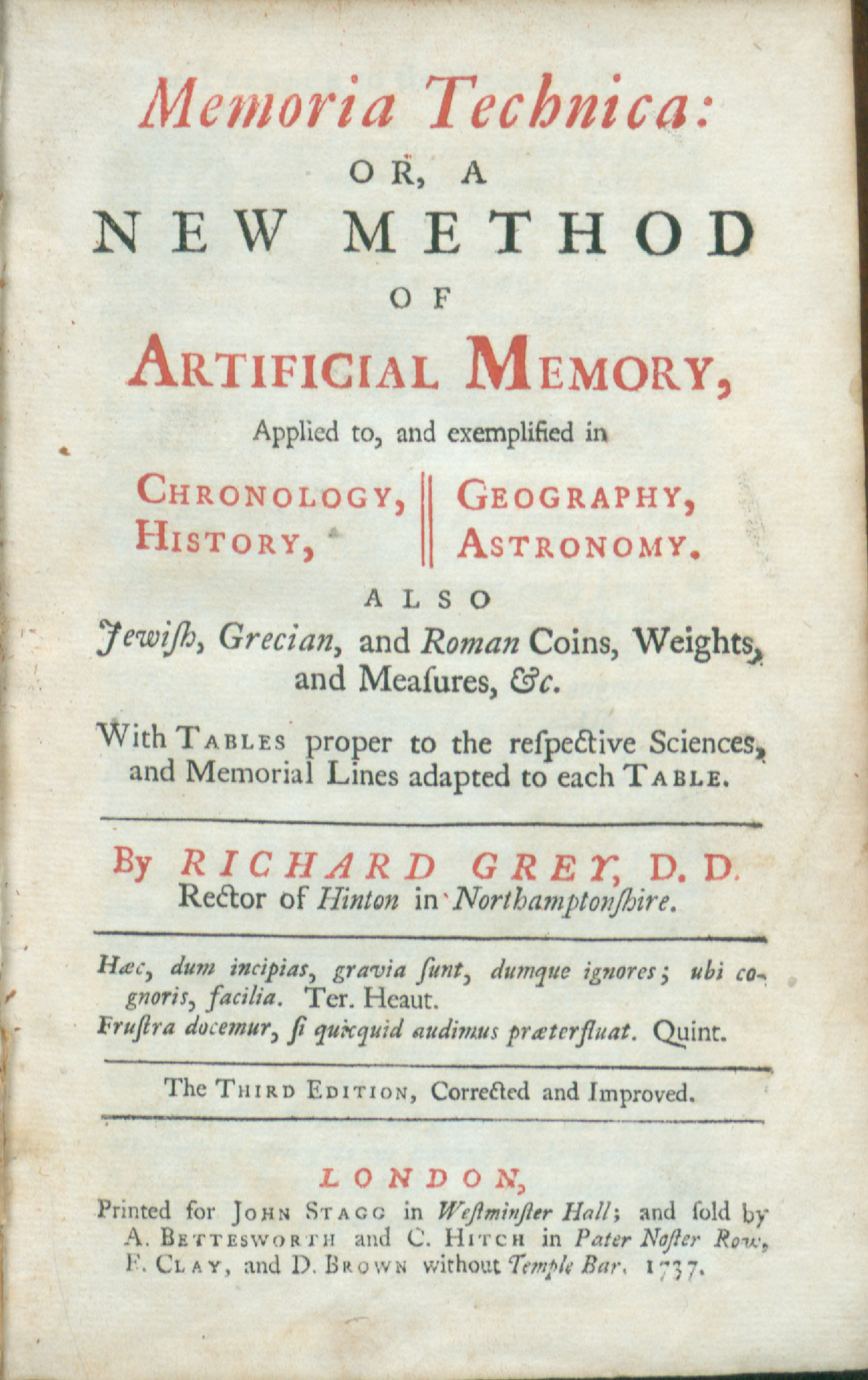
Richard Grey: Memoria technica, London 1737, 3rd edition

In 1730 appeared Grey's 'Memoria Technica; or a new Method of Artificial Memory.' Grey's system consisted in changing the last syllable of names into letters which represented figures according to an arbitrary table, and in stringing together the new formations in lines with a hexameter beat. It therefore uses strings of letters to remember numbers. Example: az = 10, tel = 325, teib = 381. The 'Memoria Technica' was applied to the dates and figures of chronology, geography, measures of weight and length, astronomy, and so on, and though uncouth and complicated met with great favour. The book went through several editions in the author's lifetime, and continued to be reprinted with modifications till 1861. On Grey's system were founded Solomon Lowe's 'Mnemonics,' and several aids to memory connected with other names.

According to Francis Fauvel Gouraud, Grey indicated that a discussion on Hebrew linguistics in William Beveridge (bishop)'s Institutionum chronotogicarum libri duo, una cum totidem arithmetices chronologicæ libellis (London, 1669) inspired him to create his system of mnemotechniques which later evolved in to the Mnemonic major system.

== Other works ==
Greay's numerous publications began with An Answer to Barbeyrac's Spirit of the Ecclesiastics of all Ages as to the Doctrines of Morality, 1722. In 1730 he published A System of English Ecclesiastical Law, extracted from the "Codex Juris Ecclesiastici Angli" of Bishop Edmund Gibson, for the use of students for holy orders. It was in recognition of this work, which passed through four editions in a few years, that the University of Oxford gave him the degree of D.D.

In 1736 Grey published The Miserable and Distracted State of Religion in England, after previous consultation with Dr. Zachary Grey. Three pedagogic works on Hebrew were A New and Easy Method of Learning Hebrew without points, to which is added by way of Praxis the Book of Proverbs divided according to the metre, with the Masoretical readings in Roman letters (1739, 3 parts), Tabula exhibens Paradigmata Verborum Hebraicorum (1739), and Historia Josephi Patriarchi; praemittitur nova methodus Hebraice discendi. Liber Jobi in versiculos metrice divisus; accedit canticum Moysis from 1742 resulted in the 1744 An Answer to Mr. Warburton's "Remarks on several Occasional Reflections" so far as they concern the preface to a late edition of the Book of Job, in allusion to which William Warburton in the second part of his 'Remarks' called him an "impotent railer". The Last Words of David, divided according to Metre, with Notes Critical and Explanatory and the 1754 Of the Immortality of the Soul, from the Latin of I. H. Browne were translations. Grey also printed sermons and pamphlets on religious subjects.

== Family ==
Grey married Joyce, youngest daughter of John Thicknesse, rector of Farthingo, Northamptonshire, and brother of Philip Thicknesse. She died on 12 January 1794, aged 89. He left three daughters, of whom the eldest, Joyce, married at the age of forty-five Dr. Philip Lloyd, dean of Norwich, and was known for painted windows in Norwich Cathedral. The youngest, Bridget, married the Rev. William Thomas Bowles, and was mother of William Lisle Bowles.
