= Cosmos Rossellius =

Florentine Dominican friar

Cosmos Rossellius (died 1578) was a Florentine Dominican friar who wrote a book about memory.

Theasurus artificosae memoria was published in Venice in 1579. He gives a Dante-esque description of hell as a memory space system arranged around a well at the top of a flight of steps consisting of the punishments for heretics, Jews, idolators and hypocrites. In contrast heaven is depicted as the throne of Christ, surrounded by a celestial hierarchy of Apostles, Patriarchs, Prophets, Martyrs, Confessors, virgins, Holy Hebrews and an enormous array of saints. He also advocates the use of the constellations as loci. He also discusses the visual alphabet, describing it as a digital alphabet, or a manual of signs for the fingers. The five woodcuts contain the earliest known representation of a digital sign language.
