= Johannes Romberch =

German writer (1480–1532)

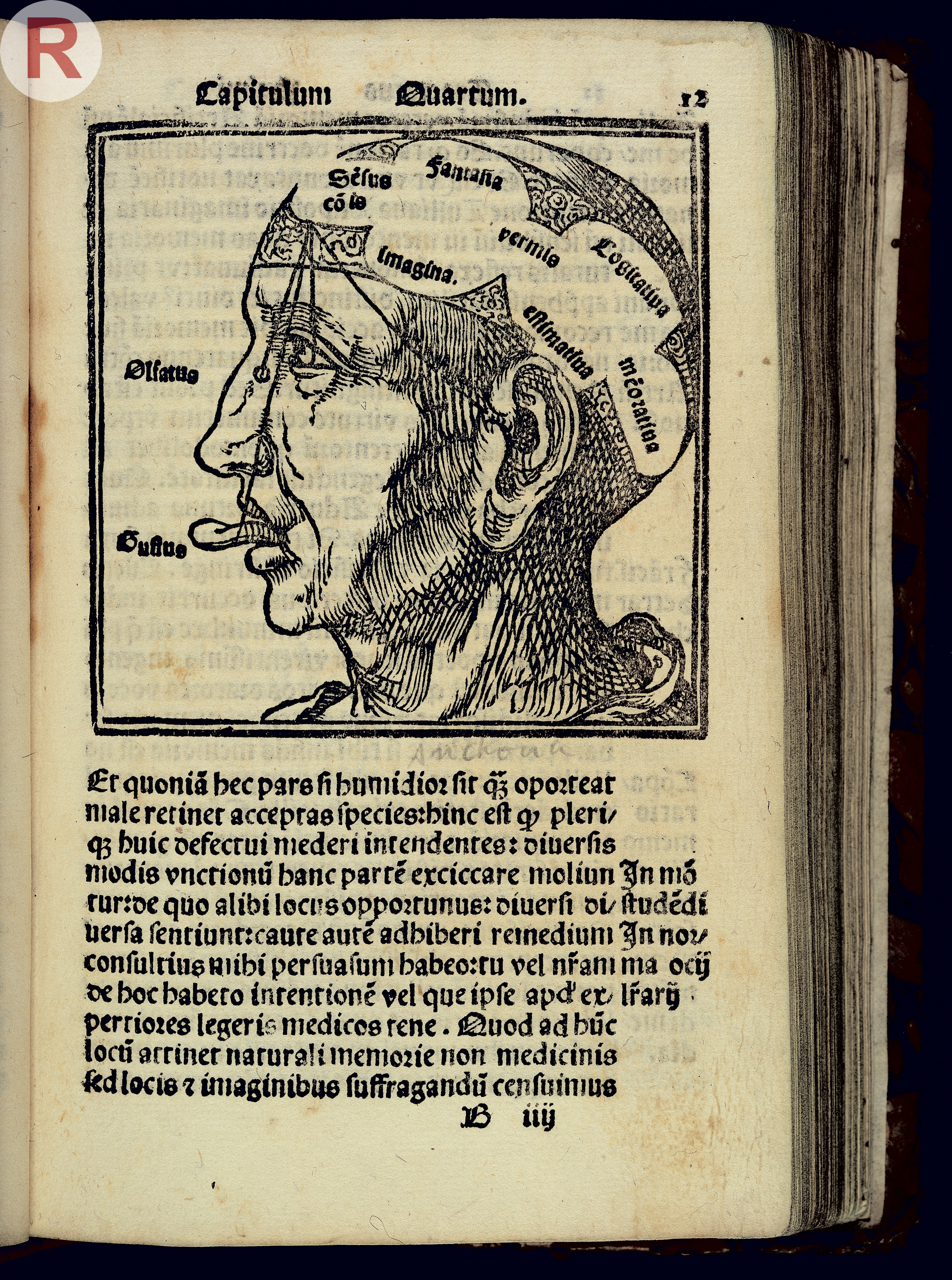
Congestorium artificiose memoriae, 1533

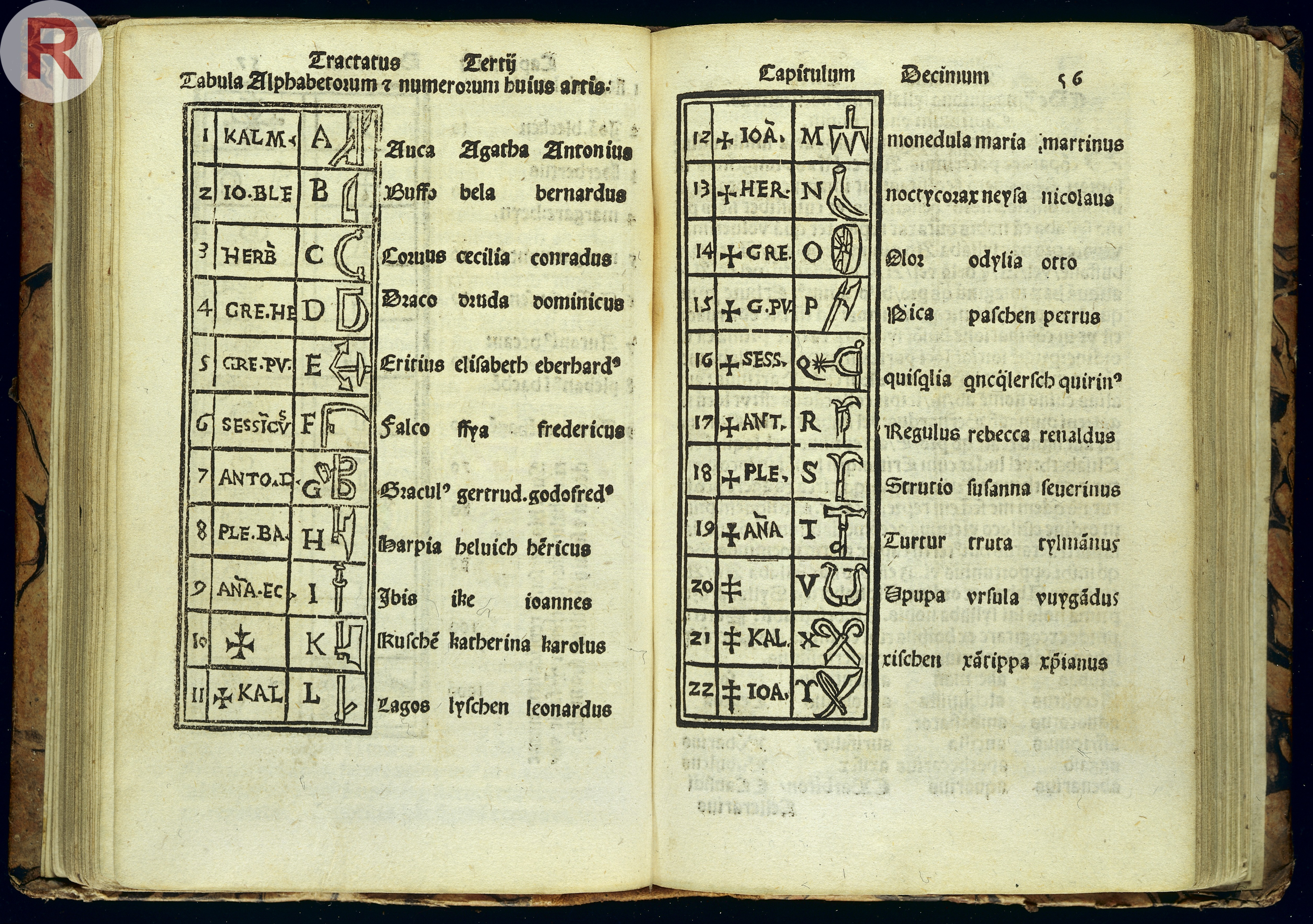
Congestorium artificiose memoriae, by Johann Romberch

Johann Host von Romberch (born on a farm at Romberg or Romberch in Westphalia c. 1480, died at the close of 1532 or the beginning of 1533) was a German Dominican, and writer.

He was one of the seven Dominicans who distinguished themselves in the struggle against Martin Luther in Cologne. At the age of sixteen he entered the Dominican Order; he studied at the University of Bologna from 1516 to 1519.

In 1520 he was appointed to the theological faculty of the University of Cologne, and despite the many religious controversies he was engaged in, he found time for literary activity. The fact of his being appointed to the facility of Cologne University is proof of the opinion held of his orthodoxy in theology: that university held a sort of censorship over all the theological faculties of Germany.

His fellow members on the university faculty, Hoogstraten and Collin, besides being distinguished churchmen were eminent among later German Humanists.

== Works ==
Among the works he edited are

- Burchard von Barby, Descriptio Terrae Sanctae
- Johann Faber, Antilogiarum Martini Lutheri Babylonia
- Dionysius the Carthusian, Commentarium in Psalmos.

He wrote many controversial works. He is known also for a 1520 book on the art of memory, Congestorium artificiose memoriae. Host's last work was the Enchiridion Sacerdotum which was published at Cologne in 1532.
