= Linkword =

Mnemonic system for learning languages

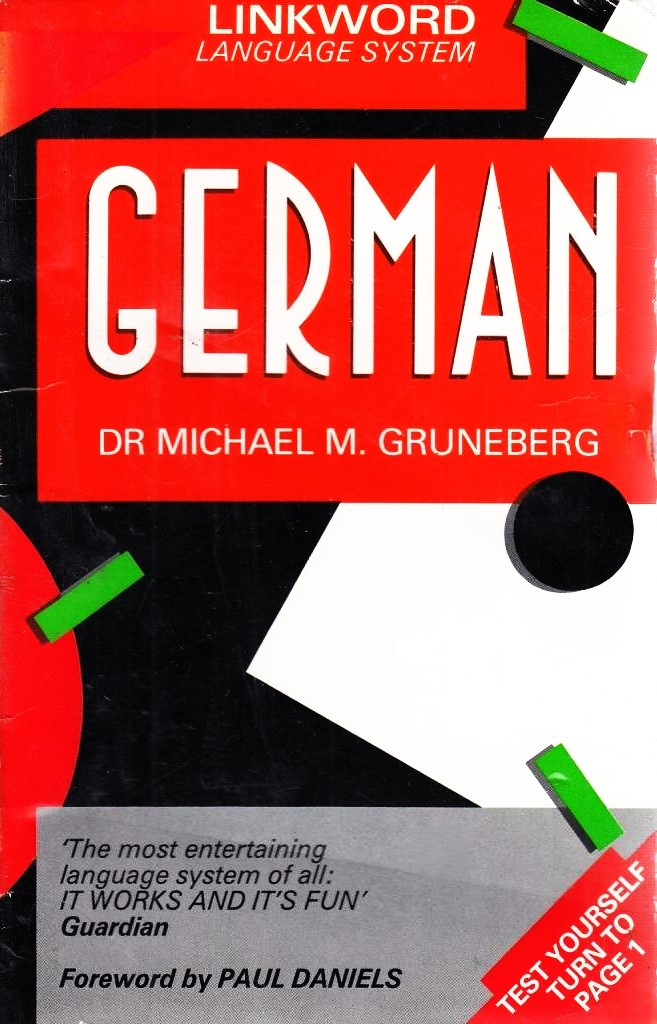
Michael M. Gruneberg: German, Corgi, London 1991

Linkword is a mnemonic system promoted by Michael Gruneberg since at least the early 1980s for learning languages based on the similarity of the sounds of words. The process involves creating an easily visualized scene that will link the words together. One example is the Russian word for cow (корова, pronounced roughly karova): think and visualize "I ran my car over a cow."

It has a long history of software versions in its native United Kingdom being available for the Sinclair, Acorn and BBC Micro computers as well as a variety of audio and book editions over the years.

== Discussion of the method ==
Many teachers and students of language have used the same technique, and many examples have been used independently by many people (e.g., to remember that in Thai, khao means rice, imagine a cow eating rice).

One of the drawbacks of such methods is that it takes a lot of effort to create a scene for every new word. Linkword has the advantage of offering ready made scenes for each word, so hundreds of words can be memorized in a few hours. However, it offers only a basic vocabulary (e.g. 200 words for a survival course and around 1400 words for a 4-level course). Proponents of the method say that the effort to create a scene for a new word is less than or equal to the time required to memorize the word using other techniques (e.g. flashcards, Spaced repetition, and repeatedly saying a word out loud).

Another criticism of mnemonic techniques such as this is that they tend to assume a one-to-one relationship between the learner's first language and the target language. In reality, words often have a different range of meanings, and so the student must learn the complexity or nuance of the new words. For this reason, such techniques may be seen as a useful and powerful way to progress in the language, especially in the early stages, rather than giving a complete understanding.

Critics also say that because the method relies on the coincidental similarities in the sounds of words, it cannot be used to teach all, or even most, words of another language as there may be no corresponding phonetically similar words or visualizations that could be used. In practice, however, there is usually a visualization that can be used, but for some words it is a less direct connection and not as effective. In these cases, there is more need for other learning methods to support the visualization, such as repetition and flashcards.

The system is similar to a well-known trick of some stage mnemonists employed for memorizing huge lists of words suggested by spectators to repeat them in any given order, forwards, backwards, even ones, etc., known as mnemonic peg system. A mnemonist has his own "counting list" of words. Each counting word is bound to the next spectator's word by means of a sentence, as described above. Some mnemonists claim the sillier the binding sentence, the easier it is to remember.

While this method could be used to teach from any language to any language, it is currently used almost exclusively to teach English speaking people other languages. Many different companies offer systems based on this method, but the list of languages offered is almost identical. Learning courses have been developed to teach students Dutch, French, German, Greek, Hebrew, Italian, Japanese, Portuguese (both Brazilian and European), Russian, Spanish (both European and South American) and Welsh.
