= Mnemonic peg system =

Mnemonic technique for memorizing long numbers

The mnemonic peg system, invented by Henry Herdson, is a memory aid that works by creating mental associations between two concrete objects in a one-to-one fashion that will later be applied to to-be-remembered information. Typically this involves linking nouns to numbers and it is common practice to choose a noun that rhymes with the number it is associated with. These will be the pegs of the system. These associations have to be memorized one time and can be applied repeatedly to new information that needs to be memorized.

== Types of peg-word systems ==
=== Rhyming peg-word system ===
The rhyming peg-word system is very simple, as stated above and could look something like this:

1. Sun: Visualize an association between the first item and the sun.
2. Shoe: Visualize an association between the second item and a shoe.
3. Tree: Visualize an association between the third item and a tree.
4. Door: Visualize an association between the fourth item and a door.
5. Hive: Visualize an association between the fifth item and a bee hive.
6. Chicks: Visualize an association between the sixth item and chicks.
7. Heaven: Visualize an association between the seventh item and Heaven.
8. Weight: Visualize an association between the eighth item and weights.
9. Brine: Visualize an association between the ninth item and brine.
10. Hen: Visualize an association between the tenth item and a hen.

For example, to remember the first 8 digits of Pi, using the major system as well:

1. 3: Picture a monkey walking on the Sun.
2. 1: Picture a dog jumping over a shoe.
3. 4: Picture a bottle of rum hanging from a tree.
4. 1: Picture a tube connecting to a door.
5. 5: Picture bees flying from a cup of lemonade as if it is a hive.
6. 9: Picture a beetle climbing onto a chick nest.
7. 2: Picture a newt with angel wings and a halo.
8. 6: Picture a jaguar lifting weights.

The next step is to link the items with some sort of dramatic action, in order to record the order in which they appear.

The less likely you are to have seen the scene in real life, the more likely it is to make a reliably retrievable impression.

=== Major system ===
While it is common to link rhyming nouns with numbers, that is by no means the only system. There is also the major system, which connects sounds to numbers. The major system is more complicated to learn than simple rhymes or alphabetic pegs, because it associates numbers 0-9 with a specific letter or sound, then larger numbers can combine to create words out of the sounds. It is limitless in the number of pegs it can produce. The most common association between numbers and letters is the following:

- 0 = s, x, z
- 1 = t, d
- 2 = n
- 3 = m
- 4 = r
- 5 = l
- 6 = sh, ch, j, soft g
- 7 = c, k, hard g, q
- 8 = f, v
- 9 = p, b

This would make the number 33 "MM" which could be made into the word "mom" to better aid in memorization or 92 is "PN" and could become "pen." "Cat" (or "cut") would correspond to 71, as vowels do not have any value.

=== PAO system ===
The person-action-object (PAO) system is the most complex. It associates all numbers 00-99 with a distinctive person, action and object. Any six-digit number can be memorized by using the person assigned the first two digits, the action of the next two digits and the object of the third. For example:

- The number 34 could be Frank Sinatra.
- 13 could be the action of kicking.
- 79 could be a cape.

This would make the number 341379, Frank Sinatra kicking a cape. Memory grand master, Ed Cooke, reportedly has been working on the Millennium PAO system, which would create an association for all numbers 000-999.

== Application ==
The peg system is commonly used by Mental Athletes for memory competitions for events like card memorization as well as digit memorization. The peg system has also been applied in a classroom with learning disabled students. The students that used the peg system performed significantly better than the control in both immediate and delayed tests.

Several studies have investigated the use of this memory mnemonic as a form of an imagery-based memory system within the process of learning a second-language. For example, if a native English speaker is attempting to learn Spanish, he will notice that the Spanish for duck is pato, which is pronounced similarly to the English word pot. The individual can develop a mnemonic peg system in order to remember this association by thinking of a duck with a pot on its head.

One complaint concerning the peg system is that it seems to only be applicable in mundane situations. However, the peg system can be used to remember grocery lists, key points in speeches, and many other lists specific to one's particular area of study or interest. Many recognise that this system can be used to remember a wide variety of objects or information. The peg system works, so long as the information trying to be remembered is specific, able to be visualized, and tied to a unique retrieval cue. This tool of memory can be more efficient than rote memorization.

== See also ==
- Method of loci
- Mnemonic link system
- Mnemonic major system
- Mnemonic dominic system
- Mnemonic goroawase system
- Haraguchi's mnemonic system
- Linkword
- Memory sport
