= Dominic system =

Mnemonic system for remembering sequences of digits

The Dominic system is a mnemonic system used to remember sequences of digits similar to the mnemonic major system. It was invented and used in competition by eight-time World Memory Champion Dominic O'Brien.

== Differences from the major system ==
The main difference between the Dominic system and the major system is the assignment of sounds and letters to digits. The Dominic system is a letter-based abbreviation system where the letters comprise the initials of someone's name, while the major system is typically used as a phonetic-based consonant system for either objects, animals, persons, or even words. One letter is assigned to each digit; the other sixteen letters of the alphabet are unused.

The major system would assign the sounds T + L to the number 15, and then find a word that has those sounds as the first two consonants. Mnemonic images like Tolkien, tiles, or toolbox could be assigned under the major system. In the Dominic system, 15 would be the letters A and E, and they would be used as the initials of someone's name—for example, Albert Einstein. Albert Einstein would then be given a characteristic action, such as "writing on a blackboard". Each two-digit number would have an associated person and action.

The Dominic system is specifically designed as a person-action system, while the major system can also be used to represent stand-alone objects. Many mnemonists use the major system as a person-action system as well, so the main difference is the way that images are assigned to the numbers.

Like the mnemonic major system, the Dominic system can be combined with a memory palace, thereby creating the Hotel Dominic.

== Encoding pairs of digits as people ==
Using the Dominic system every pair of digits is first associated with a person. O'Brien feels that stories and images created using people are easier to remember. This encoding is carried out ahead of time and the people are reused, since it can take quite some time.

To perform this encoding, each digit is associated with a letter using the table below. These letters then become the initials of the person representing this number. People will often use quite a loose definition of "initials", using the initial letters of a phrase describing a person, such as "80 = HO = Santa Claus, laughing and holding his belly (HO, HO, HO!)".

Number	1	2	3	4	5	6	7	8	9	0
Mnemonic	A	B	C	D	E	S	G	H	N	O

== Encoding pairs of digits as actions ==
Once each pair of digits has been associated with a person one can then cheaply create a corresponding action for each person. For example, if one had chosen to represent AE as the physicist Albert Einstein one might use a corresponding action of writing on a blackboard.

== Usage ==
Once the mappings of a pair of digits are in place a sequence of digits can be converted into a story by first encoding pairs of digits as people or actions and then chaining these people and actions together.

For example, one might remember the number 2739 as follows: First 27 would be encoded BG and then as Bill Gates, then 39 would be encoded as CN and then Chuck Norris. Using the first two digits as a person and the second two as an action, one creates the image of Bill Gates delivering a roundhouse kick. Similarly 3927 might be converted into the image of Chuck Norris writing software.

Longer numbers become stories. The long number 27636339, for example, could be chunked into 2763 6339 and then converted into BGSC SCCN. If the memorizer has also associated Santa Claus delivering presents with SC, then the chunk 2763 would represent Bill Gates delivering presents while 6339 would represent Santa Claus performing a roundhouse kick. The remembered story, therefore, could be that Bill Gates delivered presents and then got roundhouse kicked by Santa Claus.

The Dominic System is typically used along with the method of loci, which allows the easy recall of the images in order by placing them in locations along a mental journey.

=== Packs of cards ===
Although the Dominic system is a method for remembering long sequences of numbers, it can also be used to remember other sequences such as the order of a deck of playing cards. This works by establishing some method of systematically converting the objects into numbers. If the nine of clubs is associated with 39 (CN), for instance, then Chuck Norris or a roundhouse kick could be used in a story describing where the nine of clubs is in the deck.

== See also ==
- Art of memory
- Memory sport
- Mnemonic major system
