= Japanese wordplay =

Usage of Japanese language conventions to create humor

Japanese wordplay relies on the nuances of the Japanese language and Japanese script for humorous effect, functioning somewhat like a cross between a pun and a spoonerism. Double entendres have a rich history in Japanese entertainment (such as in kakekotoba) due to the language's large number of homographs (different meanings for a given spelling) and homophones (different meanings for a given pronunciation).

== Kakekotoba ==
Kakekotoba (掛詞) or "pivot words" are an early form of Japanese wordplay used in waka poetry, wherein some words represent two homonyms. The presence of multiple meanings within these words allowed poets to impart more meaning into fewer words.

== Goroawase ==
Goroawase (語呂合わせ; "phonetic matching") is an especially common form of Japanese wordplay, wherein homophonous words are associated with a given series of letters, numbers or symbols, in order to associate a new meaning with that series. The new words can be used to express a superstition about certain letters or numbers. More commonly, however, goroawase is used as a mnemonic technique, especially in the memorization of numbers such as dates in history, scientific constants and phone numbers.

=== Numeric substitution ===
In Japanese, each digit/number has at least one native Japanese (kun'yomi), Sino-Japanese (on'yomi), and English-origin reading. Furthermore, variants of readings may be produced through abbreviation (i.e. rendering ichi as i), consonant voicing and devoicing (i.e sa as za or go as ko; see Dakuten and handakuten), gemination (i.e. roku as rokku; see sokuon), vowel lengthening (i.e. ni as nii; see chōonpu), reading multiple digits (most commonly 10) as a single number, or the insertion or deletion of the nasal mora n (ん).

#	Kun'yomi	On'yomi	English	Derivative
0	ma, maru, wa	re, rei	o, ze, zero	u, e, ō, mu, no, nashi, ra, wo
1	hi, hito, hitotsu	i, ichi, itsu	wa, wan	a, hi, bi, fi, kazu
2	fu, futa, futatsu	ni, ji	tsū, tū	bu, pu, tsu, zu, nu, ne, ju, nyu
3	mi, mittsu	sa, san	surī	su, zu, ta, da, so, zo, za, zan, myu
4	yo, yon, yottsu	shi	fō	ho, bo, ji, fa
5	itsu, itsutsu	ko, go	faibu, faivu	ka, ke, ga, ge
6	mu, mutsu	ro, roku	shikkusu	me, mo, ra, ri, ru, ryu, ryū
7	na, nana, nanatsu	chi, shichi	se, ze, sebun, sevun	te, de, yu
8	ya, yatsu	ha, hachi, ba, pa	e, ei, eito	he, be
9	ko, kokonotsu	ku, gu, kyu, kyū	nain	ki, gi, chu, chū
10	to, do, tō, dō, ta	ji, jū	te, ten (Note: The reading ten is more commonly achieved by reading the decimal point as ten (点), meaning "point".)	de, den

Numeric substitutions may contain multiple types of readings and variations; for example, 0348, read as "o-su-shi-ya" (お寿司屋, sushi restaurant) uses abbreviated English readings for zero and three, an on'yomi reading for four, and ends with a kun'yomi reading for eight.

==== Examples ====
- 11 can be read as "wan-wan", which is commonly used in Japan as an onomatopoeia for a dog barking.
- 16 can be read as "hi-ro", Hiro being a common Japanese given name, as well as sounding like the English word "hero".
- 26 can be read as "fu-ro" (風呂), meaning "bath". Public baths in Japan have reduced entry fees on the 26th day of every month.
- 29 can be read as "ni-ku" (肉), meaning "meat". Restaurants and grocery stores have special offers on the 29th day of every month.
- 39 can be read as "san-kyū", referring to "thank you" in English, or as "mi-ku", referring to Hatsune Miku.
- 44 can be read as "yo-yo" and is thus a common slang term in the international competitive yo-yo community, which has a strong Japanese presence.
- 56, read as "ko-ro", is used in 56す, an alternate spelling of the verb "korosu" (殺す, to kill) used on the internet to avoid wordfilters or as "go-mu", meaning "rubber" in english often used in correlation to Monkey D. Luffy
- 89 can be read as "ha-gu", which refers to "hug" in English. August 9th is National Hug Day in Japan.
- 109 can be read as "tō-kyū". The 109 department store in Shibuya, Tokyo is often read as "ichi-maru-kyū", but the number 109 was selected as the alternative reading "tō-kyū" is a reference to Tokyu Corporation, the group that owns the building.
- 230 can be read as "fu-mi-o", the given name of former Japanese prime minister Fumio Kishida. He uses this number in his Twitter handle "kishida230".
- 428 can be read as "shi-bu-ya", referring to the Shibuya area of Tokyo, and "yo-tsu-ba" (四つ葉) meaning four-leaf clover.
- 526 can be read as "ko-ji-ro" in reference to Sasaki Kojiro, a samurai from the Edo period.
- 634 can be read as "mu-sa-shi". The Tokyo Skytree's height was intentionally set at 634 meters so it would sound like Musashi Province, an old name for the area in which the building stands.
- 801 can be read as "ya-o-i" or yaoi, a genre of homoerotic manga typically aimed at women.
- 893 can be read as "ya-ku-za" (やくざ) or "yakuza". It is traditionally a bad omen for a student to receive this candidate number for an exam.
- 1492, the year of Columbus' first voyage to America, can be read as "i-yo-ku-ni" and appended with "ga mieta" to form the phrase "Alright! I can see land!" (いいよ！国が見えた！). Additionally, "i-yo-ku-ni" itself could simply be interpreted as "It's a good country" (いいよ、国). The alternative reading "i-shi-ku-ni" is also used to memorize the year, though it is not typically associated with a particular meaning.
- 4649 can be read as "yo-ro-shi-ku" (よろしく), meaning "best regards".
- 18782 + 18782 = 37564 can be read as "i-ya-na-ya-tsu + i-ya-na-ya-tsu = mi-na-go-ro-shi" (嫌な奴＋嫌な奴＝皆殺し; bad person + bad person = massacre).
- 3.14159265, the first nine digits of pi, can be read as "san-i-shi-i-ko-ku-ni-mu-kō" (産医師異国に向こう), meaning "an obstetrician faces towards a foreign country". See also piphilology § Japanese.

== Dajare ==
In Japanese, puns are referred to as dajare (駄洒落, 'bad jokes'). Like puns in English, dajare may be considered dad jokes (親父ギャグ, oyaji gyagu). Dajare commonly involve the usage of two homophonous phrases alongside each other in a sentence, though double entendres are used as well.

Example one:

- アルミ缶の上にある蜜柑 (arumi kan no ue ni aru mikan)

Translation:
An orange on an aluminum can.
Explanation:
アルミ (arumi) means "aluminum" and 缶 (kan) means "can"; ある (aru) means "to exist" and 蜜柑 (mikan) refers to mandarin varieties popular in Japan.

Example two:

A: 大食いのたけし君も、宇宙ではあまり物を食べられないよ。 (ōgui no takeshi kun mo, uchū dewa amari mono o taberarenaiyo)
B: なぜ? (naze)
A: 宇宙には空気(食う気)がない。 (uchū niwa kūki ga nai)
Translation:
A: In space, even a glutton like Takeshi can't eat anything.
B: Why's that?
A: In space, there is no air.
Explanation:
Kūki (くうき) can mean either "air" (空気) or "appetite" (食う気), thus the last phrase could also be interpreted as "in space, (he has) no appetite".

=== Ginatayomi ===
Some dajare rely on ginatayomi (ぎなた読み, 'phrasal misparsing'; lit. 'ginata-reading') for effect, similar to garden-path sentences in English. Many are commonly told by children.

Example one:

「パン作ったことある」(pan tsukutta koto aru; Have you ever made bread before?)
Can also be interpreted as:
「パンツ食ったことある」(pantsu kutta koto aru; Have you ever eaten underpants before?)

Example two:

「ねぇ、ちゃんとお風呂入ってる」(nee, chanto ofuro haitteru; Hey, have you been bathing regularly?)
Can also be interpreted as:
「姉ちゃんとお風呂入ってる」(nee-chan to ofuro haitteru; Do you bathe with your older sister?)

== See also ==
- Japanese rebus monogram
  - Rebus § Japan
- Tetraphobia
- Word play
