= Mnemonic major system =

Mnemonic technique for memorizing long strings of numbers

The mnemonic major system (also called the phonetic number system, phonetic mnemonic system, or HErigone's mnemonic system) is a mnemonic technique used to help in memorizing numbers.

The system works by converting numbers into consonants, then into words by adding vowels. The system works on the principle that images can be remembered more easily than numbers.

One notable explanation of this system was given in Martin Gardner's book The First Scientific American Book of Mathematical Puzzles and Diversions (just Mathematical Puzzles and Diversions in the UK edition), which has since been republished in The New Martin Gardner Mathematical Library as Hexaflexagons, Probability Paradoxes, and the Tower of Hanoi. In this, Gardner traces the history of the system back to similar systems of Pierre Hérigone and Richard Grey with uses by Lewis Carroll and Gottfried Wilhelm Leibniz.

== The system ==
Each numeral is associated with one or more consonants. The link is to the sound, not the letter. (For example, the letters C in "call", "cell", and "cello" each have different values in the system: 7, 0, and 6, respectively.) Vowels, semivowels and the consonant /h/ are ignored. These can be used as "fillers" to make sensible words from the resulting consonant sequences. A standard mapping is:

Numeral	Sounds (IPA)	Commonly associated letters	Mnemonic and remarks
0	/s/, /z/	s, soft c, z	Zero begins with z (and /z/). Upper case S and Z, as well as lower case s and z, have zero vertical strokes each, as with the numeral 0. The alveolar fricatives /s/ and /z/ form a voiceless and voiced pair.
1	/t/, /d/, /θ/, /ð/	t, d, th (as in thing and this)	Upper case T and D, as well as lower case t and d have one vertical stroke each, as with the numeral 1. The alveolar stops /t/ and /d/ form a voiceless and voiced pair, as do the similar-sounding dental fricatives /θ/ and /ð/, though some variant systems may omit the latter pair.
2	/n/	n	Upper case N and lower case n each have two vertical strokes and two points on the baseline.
3	/m/	m	Lower case m has three vertical strokes. Both upper case M and lower case m each have three points on the baseline and look like the numeral 3 on its side.
4	/r/	r	Four ends with r (and /r/ in rhotic accents).
5	/l/	l	L is the Roman numeral for 50. Among the five digits of one's left hand, the thumb and index fingers also form an L.
6	/tʃ/, /dʒ/, /ʒ/, /ʃ/	ch (as in cheese), j, soft g, sh	Upper case G looks like the numeral 6 and lower case g looks like the numeral 6 rotated 180°. Lower case script j tends to have a lower loop, like the numeral 6. In some serif fonts, upper case CH, SH and ZH each have six serifs. CHurch has six letters. The postalveolar affricates /tʃ/ and /dʒ/ form a voiceless and voiced pair, as do the similar-sounding postalveolar fricatives /ʃ/ and /ʒ/.
7	/k/, /ɡ/	k, hard c, q, hard g, ch (as in loch),	Both upper case K and lower case k look like two small 7s on their sides. In some fonts, the lower-right part of the upper case G looks like a 7. G is also the 7th letter of the alphabet. The velar stops /k/ and /ɡ/ form a voiceless and voiced pair.
8	/f/, /v/	f, ph (as in phone), v	Lower case script f, which tends to have an upper and lower loop, looks like a figure-8. The labiodental fricatives /f/ and /v/ form a voiceless and voiced pair.
9	/p/, /b/	p, b	Upper case P and lower case p look like the numeral 9 flipped horizontally. Lower case b looks like the numeral 9 turned 180°. The labial stops /p/ and /b/ form a voiceless and voiced pair.
Unassigned	/h/, /j/, /w/, /x/, vowel sounds	h, y, w, a, e, i, o, u, silent letters, ch (as in chutzpah), j (in Hallelujah and jalapeno), ll (in tortilla)	Vowel sounds, semivowels (/j/ and /w/) and /h/ do not correspond to any number. They can appear anywhere in a word without changing its number value.
(2, 27 or 7)	/ŋ/	ng, n before k, hard c, q, hard g or x	Variant systems differ about whether /ŋ/ should encode 2 and classified together with /n/, 7 and classified together with /k/ and /ɡ/ or even 27 (e.g. ring could be 42, 47 or 427). When a /k/ and /ɡ/ is pronounced separately after the /ŋ/, variant systems that choose /ŋ/ to be 27 also disagree if an extra 7 should be written (e.g. finger could be 8274 or 82774, or if /ŋ/ is chosen to be 7, 8774).

The groups of similar sounds and the rules for applying the mappings are almost always fixed, but other hooks and mappings can be used as long as the person using the system can remember them and apply them consistently.

Each numeral maps to a set of similar sounds with similar mouth and tongue positions. The link is phonetic, that is to say, it is the consonant sounds that matter, not the spelling. Therefore, a word like action would encode the number 762 (/k/-/ʃ/-/n/), not 712 (k-t-n). Double letters are disregarded when not pronounced separately, e.g. muddy encodes 31 (/m/-/d/), not 311, but midday encodes 311 (/m/-/d/-/d/) while accept encodes 7091 (/k/-/s/-/p/-/t/) since the ds and cs are pronounced separately. x encodes 70 when pronounced as /ks/ or /gz/ (e.g. in fax and exam) and 76 when pronounced /kʃ/ or /gʒ/ (e.g. in anxious or luxury); z encodes 10 when pronounced /ts/ (e.g. in pizza). In ghost (701, /ɡ/-/s/-/t/) and enough (28, /n/-/f/), gh is being encoded by different numerals. Usually, a rhotic accent is assumed, e.g. fear would encode 84 (/f/-/r/) rather than 8 (/f/).

Often the mapping is compact. Hindquarters, for example, translates unambiguously to 2174140 (/n/-/d/-/k/-/r/-/t/-/r/-/z/), which amounts to a twelve-letter word encoded by seven digits in seven letters, and can be easily visualized.

Each numeral maps to a set of similar sounds with similar mouth and tongue positions. For most people it would be easier to remember 3.1415927 (an approximation of the mathematical constant pi) as:

meteor (314, /m/-/t/-/r/)
tail (15, /t/-/l/)
pink (927, /p/-/ŋ/-/k/, and taking /ŋ/ to be 2)

Short term visual memory of imagined scenes allows large numbers of digits to be memorized with ease. Longer-term memory may require the formulation of more object-related mnemonics with greater logical connection, perhaps forming grammatical sentences that apply to the matter rather than just strings of images.

The system can be employed with phone numbers. One would typically make up multiple words, preferably a sentence, or an ordered sequence of images featuring the owner of the number.

The Major System can be combined with a peg system for remembering lists, and is sometimes used also as a method of generating the pegs. It can also be combined with other memory techniques such as rhyming, substitute words, or the method of loci. Repetition and concentration using the ordinary memory is still required.

It is possible to use a computer to automatically translate the number into a set of words. One can then pick the best of several alternatives. Such programs include "Numzi" "Rememberg" "Fonbee", the freeware "2Know", and the website "pinfruit".

=== Example words ===
Some of these example words may belong to more than one word category.

1-digit pegs
	0	1	2	3	4	5	6	7	8	9
noun	hose	hat	hen	home	arrow	whale	shoe	cow	hoof	pie
verb	sew	hate	know	aim	row	heal	chew	hook	view	buy
adjective	easy	hot	new	yummy	hairy	oily	itchy	gay	heavy	happy

2-digit pegs
	00	01	02	03	04	05	06	07	08	09
noun	sauce	seed	sun	sumo	sierra	soil	sewage	sky	sofa	soap
verb	assess	swat	assign	assume	sorrow	sell	switch	soak	save	sob
adjective	sissy	sad	snowy	awesome	sorry	slow	swishy	sick	savvy	sappy
	10	11	12	13	14	15	16	17	18	19
noun	daisy	tattoo	tuna	dome	diary	tail	dish	dog	dove	tuba
verb	tease	edit	widen	time	draw	tell	teach	take	defy	type
adjective	dizzy	tight	wooden	tame	dry	tall	whitish	thick	deaf	deep
	20	21	22	23	24	25	26	27	28	29
noun	nose	net	onion	enemy	winery	nail	nacho	neck	knife	honeybee
verb	ionize	unite	nanny^{[b]}	name	honour^{[a]}	inhale	enjoy	knock	envy	nab
adjective	noisy	neat	neon	numb	narrow	annual	nudgy	naggy	naïve	wannabe
	30	31	32	33	34	35	36	37	38	39
noun	mouse	meadow	moon	mummy	emery	mole	match	mug	movie	map
verb	amuse	meet	mine	mime	marry	mail	mash	mock	move	mop
adjective	messy	mute	mean	mum^{[c]}	merry	male	mushy	mucky	mauve	wimpy
	40	41	42	43	44	45	46	47	48	49
noun	rice	road	rain	rum	aurora	railway	roach	rag	roof	rope
verb	erase	read	ruin	ram	rear^{[a]}	rule	reach	rake	arrive	wrap
adjective	rosy	ready	runny	haram	rare^{[a]}	royal	rich	rocky	rough	ripe
	50	51	52	53	54	55	56	57	58	59
noun	louse	lady	lion	lime	lorry	lily	leech	leg	lava	lip
verb	lose	let	align	loom	lure^{[a]}	lull	latch	lick	love	help
adjective	lazy	elite	alien	lame	leery	loyal	lush	lucky	leafy	loopy
	60	61	62	63	64	65	66	67	68	69
noun	cheese	cheetah	chin	gem	shrew	chilli	cha-cha	chick	chef	jeep
verb	chase	cheat	chain	jam	jury	chill	judge	check	achieve	chop
adjective	choosy	chatty	shiny	sham	cherry	jolly	Jewish	shaky	chief	cheap
	70	71	72	73	74	75	76	77	78	79
noun	goose	cat	coin	game	crow	clay	cage	cake	cave	cube
verb	kiss	quote	weaken	comb	carry	kill	coach	cook	give	copy
adjective	cozy	good	keen	gummy	grey	cool	catchy	quick	goofy	agape^{[d]}
	80	81	82	83	84	85	86	87	88	89
noun	vase	video	fan	ovum	fairy	fool	veggie	fig	fife ^{[e]}	vibe
verb	fuse	fight	fine	fume	fry	fly	fetch	fake	viva ^{[f]}	fob^{[g]}
adjective	fussy	fat	funny	foamy	furry	foul	fishy	foggy	fave	fab
	90	91	92	93	94	95	96	97	98	99
noun	boss	bead	pony	puma	berry	bell	pouch	bike	beef	pipe
verb	oppose	bite	ban	bomb	bury	peel	patch	poke	pave	pop
adjective	busy	bad	bony	balmy	pro	blue	bushy	back	puffy	baby

- ^a Assumes a rhotic accent
- ^b nanny (verb): to be overprotective towards
- ^c mum (adjective): silent; not saying a word
- ^d agape (adjective): with the mouth wide open, as in wonder, surprise, or eagerness
- ^e fife (noun): a high-pitched transverse flute used commonly in military and marching musical groups
- ^f viva (verb): to examine orally
- ^g fob (verb), archaic: to cheat; deceive

== History ==
The mnemonic major system is a widely used phonetic number memorization technique that associates numbers with sounds or words to make them easier to recall. This system is part of a broader tradition of phonetic number systems found across different cultures. For instance, in India, the Katapayadi system, which dates back to at least the 7th century, represents another ancient and sophisticated approach to encoding numbers using phonetic values.

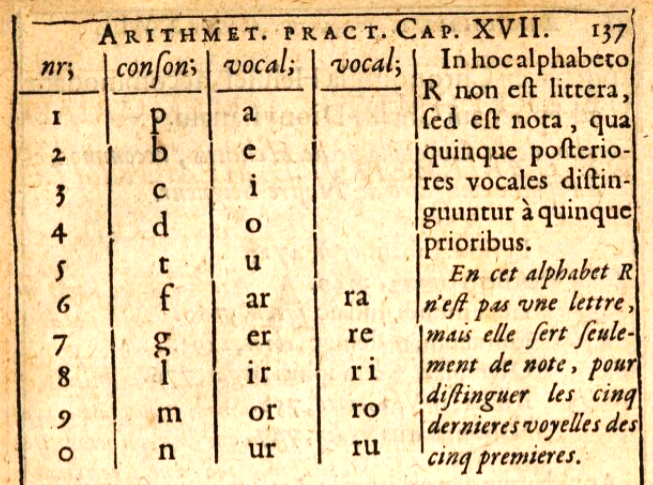
Mnemonic major system by Pierre Hérigone from 1634

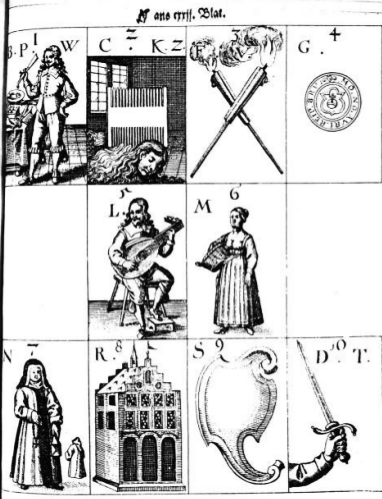
Johann Just Winckelmann - mnemonic major system from 1648

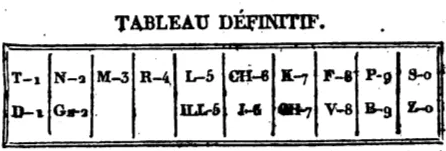
Major system by Aimé Paris from 1825. – 1: T, D; 2: N, GN; 3: M; 4: R; 5: L, ILL; 6:CH, J; 7: K, GH; 8: F, V; 9: P, B; 0: S, Z

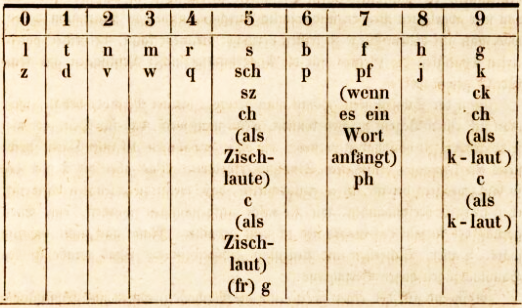
Mnemonic major system by Carl Otto Reventlow – 1843

A different memory system, the method of loci, was taught to schoolchildren for centuries, at least until 1584, "when Puritan reformers declared it unholy for encouraging bizarre and irreverent images." The same objection can be made over the major system, with or without the method of loci. Mental images may be easier to remember if they are insulting, violent, or obscene (see Von Restorff effect).

Pierre Hérigone (1580–1643) devised the earliest version of the major system and published it in 1634. The system was further developed by Johann Just Winckelmann (pseudonym Stanislaus Mink von Weunsshein and published in 1648. It was later elaborated upon by other users. In 1730, Richard Grey set forth a complicated system that used both consonants and vowels to represent the digits. In 1808 Gregor von Feinaigle introduced the improvement of representing the digits by consonants (but reversed the values of 8 and 9 compared to those listed above).

In 1825 Aimé Paris published the first known version of the major system in its modern form.

In 1843, Carl Otto Reventlow (1817–1873) published a mnemonics textbook on a method similar to Paris' and traveled throughout Germany promoting it.

In 1844 Francis Fauvel Gouraud (1808–1847) delivered a series of lectures introducing his mnemonic system which was based on Aimé Paris' version. The lectures drew some of the largest crowds ever assembled to hear lectures of a "scientific" nature up to that time. This series of lectures was later published as Phreno-Mnemotechny or The Art of Memory in 1845 and his system received wide acclaim. According to Gouraud, Richard Grey indicated that a discussion on Hebrew linguistics in William Beveridge's Institutionum chronotogicarum libri duo, una cum totidem arithmetices chronologicæ libellis (London, 1669) inspired him to create his system of mnemotechniques which later evolved in to the major system.

In the 1880s Marcus Dwight Larrowe, alias Silas Holmes, was teaching memory courses in the United States based on the Major System using a third alias Dr. Antoine Loisette. Because he was charging inordinate sums of money for a system which had obviously existed before, George S. Fellows published "Loisette" exposed (1888) and included all the material of Larrowe's course which he determined not to be under copyright. The incident was notable enough to gain coverage by way of a book review in the journal Science. A well-known student of Loisette's included Mark Twain whose endorsement Loisette used regularly to sell his course. Following the revelation that he had not originated the system, Larrowe self-published his material under the pseudonym Dr. Antoine Loisette in 1895 and 1896 and it was later re-published by Funk & Wagnalls in 1899.

In the late 1800s Christof Ludwig Poehlmann (aka Christopher Louis Pelman), a German who had emigrated to the United States, and William Joseph Ennever created and ran a series of booklets and memory courses using the system which resulted in The Pelman Schools, The Pelman Institute, and were generally known as Pelmanism.

Poehlmann eventually moved back to Germany around 1910 where he continued offering his memory courses and training apparently with a focus on language learning. Bruno Fürst indicated that he studied under him for a year in 1911. Fürst later practiced criminal law in Frankfort in pre-Hitler Germany before fleeing, as a Jew, to Prague where he taught at Masaryk University until emigrating to New York in 1939. In 1939, Fürst published Use your Head followed by How to Remember (1944), which was later reprinted as The Practical Way to Better Memory, and followed up with a series of 12 booklets entitled You Can Remember! A Home Study Course in Memory and Concentration (1946) which all extolled the system, which he called the "Basic List" and the "Number System" along with other mnemonic systems. In a 1946 profile in The New Yorker, Bruno indicates that German scholar Conradus Celtes originated the system.

The system described in this article would be re-popularized after 1957 and through the 1980s in several books by Harry Lorayne, a magician and best selling contemporary author on memory. The most popular of the titles featuring the system is The Memory Book: The Classic Guide to Improving Your Memory at Work, at School, and at Play (1974, with Jerry Lucas).

This phonetic system had another resurgence in the 1990s thanks to the late night infomercials of Kevin Trudeau who sold a series of tapes called Mega Memory. He also published a similar book Kevin Trudeau's Mega Memory which used this same system with some slight modifications.

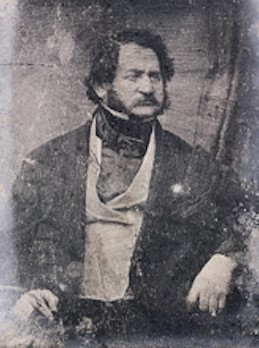
Major Bartłomiej Beniowski (1800–1867)

Major system by Beniowski (1845)
Number	Consonants
0	s, z
1	t, d, th
2	n
3	m
4	r
5	l
6	h, ch, sh, j
7	k, g
8	f, v, w
9	p, b

The name "Major System" may refer to Major Bartlomiej Beniowski, who published a version of the system in his book, The Anti-Absurd or Phrenotypic English Pronouncing and Orthographical Dictionary in 1845.

There is a possibility that the roots of the Major System are entangled with older systems of shorthand. It is possible that the underlying structure of the Major System overlaps with Gregg shorthand, a popular shorthand system in the late 1800s and early 1900s.

== Practice ==
Memory feats centered around numbers can be performed by experts who have learned a 'vocabulary' of at least one image for each 1 and 2-digit number, as these can then be combined to form narratives. Learning a vocabulary of 3-digit numbers is harder, because ten times more images need to be learned for each extra digit. Many mnemonists, however, can use a set of over 1000 images.

The combination of images into a narrative is easier to do rapidly than forming a coherent grammatical sentence. This pre-memorisation and practice at forming images reduces the time required to think up a good imaginary object while creating a strong memorable impression of it. The best words for this purpose are usually nouns, especially those for distinctive objects such as those which make strong impressions on a variety of senses (e.g. "Lime" for 53, as its taste, smell, colour, and even texture are distinctive) or which move (e.g. "arrow" for 4). For basic proficiency, a large vocabulary of image words is not really necessary, since when the table above is reliably learned, it is easy to form your own words ad hoc.

== Indexing sequences ==
Mnemonics often center around learning a complete sequence where all objects in that sequence that come before the one you are trying to recall must be recalled first. For instance, when using the mnemonic "Richard of York gave battle in vain" to learn the colours of the rainbow, (red, orange, yellow, green, blue, indigo and violet) to remember what colour comes after indigo, one would have to recall the whole sequence. For a short sequence this may be trivial; for longer lists, it can become complicated and error-prone.

A good example would be in recalling the 53rd element of the periodic table. It might be possible to construct and learn a string of 53 or more items, each of which links to an element and then to recall them one by one sequentially. But it would be a great deal easier to directly associate element 53 with, for example, a lime (a suitable mnemonic for 53) recalling some prior imagining of a mishap where lime juice gets into one's eye - "eye" sounding like "I", the symbol for Iodine. This allows random access directly to the item, without the need for recalling any previous items.

To remember element 54 one might then recall an image for 54, for instance a friend called "Laura" (54), in the lotus position looking very Zen-like as a mnemonic that element 54 is Xenon.

This is an example of combining the Major System with the peg system.

== See also ==
- Dominic system
- Memory sport
- Katapayadi system
- Rhyming letter getter
- Numeric substitution in Japanese
