= Foer =

Foer is a surname. Notable people with the surname include:

- Esther Safran Foer (born 1946), American writer
- Franklin Foer (born 1974), American journalist (The Atlantic, The New Republic)
- Jonathan Safran Foer (born 1977), American novelist
- Joshua Foer (born 1982), American freelance journalist and non-fiction writer
