= USA Memory Championship =

Annual memory competition

The USA Memory Championship (USAMC) is an annual memory sport competition founded in 1997 by Tony Dottino and Marshall Tarley, that takes place every autumn at Full Sail University in Orlando, Florida. In 2024, the USAMC partnered with the Massachusetts Institute of Technology to host an additional competition in honor of the USAMC's 25th anniversary, titled "The Champion of Champions Memory Tournament," in which previous champions and notable competitors were pitted against one other to determine the "Champion of Champions." Prior to 2016, the USAMC previously took place every spring in New York City.

Designed to test the limits and potential of the human brain, and with the purpose of raising public awareness about memory and its critical role as the foundation of one's cognitive faculties, the USAMC seeks the top 12 Memory Athletes (MAs) in the U.S. to go head-to-head in attempting to memorize as much information as possible, across a series of elimination-style events. The competition currently consists of nine total events, five of which are online qualifying events, while the final four events are held live event to determine the champion.

== Competition Format ==
=== Championship Events ===
The live championship consists of the following four events:

- It's Been a Long Time: MAs are given reams of data to study (approximately 4,000 data points) anywhere from a couple of weeks to a month in advance on a randomly selected subject, such as the Periodic Table of the Elements, Space Shuttle missions, NFL Hall-of-Famers, National Parks, and Supreme Court Justices.
  - Each MA is provided one unique question per round. Questions vary from level 1 to level 4, with each level increase introducing more difficult questions.
    - If the subject chosen were state trivia, an example of a level 1 question may be something along the lines of, "what is the capital of Alabama?" Whereas a level 4 question may be something more like, "name in order the four biggest states, from largest to smallest, and each of their areas in square miles."
  - MAs have 2 strikes or misses before they are eliminated.
  - 4 MAs eliminated ends the event.
- Words to Remember: MAs are brought backstage, and given 15 minutes to memorize a list of 300 randomized words (concrete nouns, abstract nouns, and verbs), before they are brought back on stage for recall.
  - The allotted recall time is 15 seconds.
  - MAs have one strike or miss before they are eliminated.
  - If an MA misses a word, it is the next MA's responsibility to recall that word.
    - e.g. if MA #1 incorrectly recites the word "shoes," MA #2 is tasked to recall the correct word, which is "shoe."
    - Should all MAs miss this word, the missed word will be announced by the host.
  - 3 MAs eliminated ends the event.
    - In the event that all 300 words are recalled and 3 MAs have not been eliminated, the remaining MAs will advance to the next round.
- Tea Party: Six guests introduce themselves to MAs one by one, offering details about themselves such as their full name, birthday, high school alma mater, car's year/make/model, pet's name/breed/color, three favorite hobbies, and three favorite foods.
  - After all the guests have "met" the MAs, "mind maps" of all guests are given to each MA, and projected for the audience to see. MAs are given an additional five minutes to review the mind maps on stage before recall commences.
  - Guest photos are presented in a randomized order from the introduction, and MAs are asked a question about the guest.
  - The allotted recall time is 15 seconds.
  - MAs have two strikes or misses before they are eliminated.
  - Should an MA answer incorrectly, the next MA will be asked to recall the missed information.
  - 3 MAs eliminated ends the event.
    - If the event begins with more than the intended 6 MAs, recall will continue until 3 MAs remain.
    - Should the event end and more than 3 MAs remain, the remaining MAs will advance to the finale.
- Double Deck or Bust (Finale): The remaining MAs are seated on-stage at separate tables facing the audience. A barrier/panel will separate each MA from seeing each other.
  - Two decks of shuffled cards, identically arranged, will be presented to each MA--104 cards (2 decks mixed together) are in each MA's pile.
    - Prior to memorization, the order of memorization (top to bottom vs. bottom to top) will be decided by a coin flip.
  - The MAs will have 5 minutes to memorize on-stage.
    - At the conclusion of the memorization period, there will be a 60-second consolidation period.
  - Recall is done round-robin style, and sudden-death; one mistake eliminates the MA.
  - The allotted recall time is 15 seconds.

=== Qualifying Events ===
Participation is open to U.S. citizens who are at least 12 years of age. The qualifiers are hosted on the website Memory League, and the qualifying events are as follows:

- Cards: 300 seconds are given to memorize up to 52 cards.
- Images: 300 seconds are given to memorize 30 images, in order.
- Names: 300 seconds are given to memorize 30 names and faces.
- Numbers: 300 seconds are given to memorize 80 digits.
- Words: 300 seconds are given to memorize a list of 50 words, in order.

== Preparation ==
It is not unusual for athletes to prepare for years leading up to competition. MAs typically use a combination of different memory systems and mnemonics. Some of the most popular methods include designing and building a memory palace, i.e. Method of loci, PAO (Person Action Object) System, and Major System. These systems render MAs able to memorize vast amounts of information in a short amount of time.

One competitor, Joshua Foer, was able to win the 2006 competition with just one year of preparation by learning and practicing these techniques every day. He wrote about his journey under the wing of British Mental Athlete Ed Cooke, who set him on his path of memory. This year-long journey later resulted in Foer's book, Moonwalking with Einstein.

== Qualifying and Championship Records ==
Current USAMC Final Championship records:

- Words to Remember: Jason Smith, 138 words in 15 minutes (2024)
- Double Deck or Bust: John Graham, 104 cards in 5 minutes (2018)

Record-holders for the fastest times and the most points in individual qualifying events (Memory League):

- Cards: Grace Luo, 52 cards in 36.71 seconds (2025)
- Images: James Cumming, 30 images in 26.8 seconds (2025)
- Names: Tianjun Zhu, 30 names in 61.8 seconds (2024)
- Numbers: Patricia Lee, 80 numbers in 22.64 seconds (2024)
- Words: James Cumming, 50 words in 55.64 seconds (2025)

Records from prior championship events:

- Names and Faces: Nelson Dellis, 235 points (2019)
- Speed Numbers: Alex Mullen, 483 digits (2016)
- Poetry: Katherine He, 335 points (2016)
- Speed Cards: Alex Mullen, 52 cards in 18.65 seconds (2016)

== Champions ==
This is a list of USA memory champions since 1998:

- 1998 - Tatiana Cooley-Marquardt
- 1999 - Tatiana Cooley-Marquardt
- 2000 - Tatiana Cooley-Marquardt
- 2001 - Scott Hagwood
- 2002 - Scott Hagwood
- 2003 - Scott Hagwood
- 2004 - Scott Hagwood
- 2005 - Ram Kolli
- 2006 - Joshua Foer
- 2007 - David Thomas
- 2008 - Chester Santos
- 2009 - Ron White
- 2010 - Ron White
- 2011 - Nelson Dellis
- 2012 - Nelson Dellis
- 2013 - Ram Kolli
- 2014 - Nelson Dellis
- 2015 - Nelson Dellis
- 2016 - Alex Mullen
- 2017 - no competition was held
- 2018 - John Graham
- 2019 - Lance Tschirhart
- 2020 - Makenna Good
- 2021 - Nelson Dellis
- 2022 - John Graham
- 2023 - John Graham
- 2024 - Nelson Dellis
- 2025 - Wesley Twiggs

== See also ==
- Art of memory
- Memory sport
- Method of loci
- Mnemonist
- World Memory Championships
- Extreme Memory Tournament
- Grand Master of Memory
- Moonwalking with Einstein
- Nelson Dellis
- Chester Santos
