= Joshua Foer =

American journalist; memory champion (born 1982)

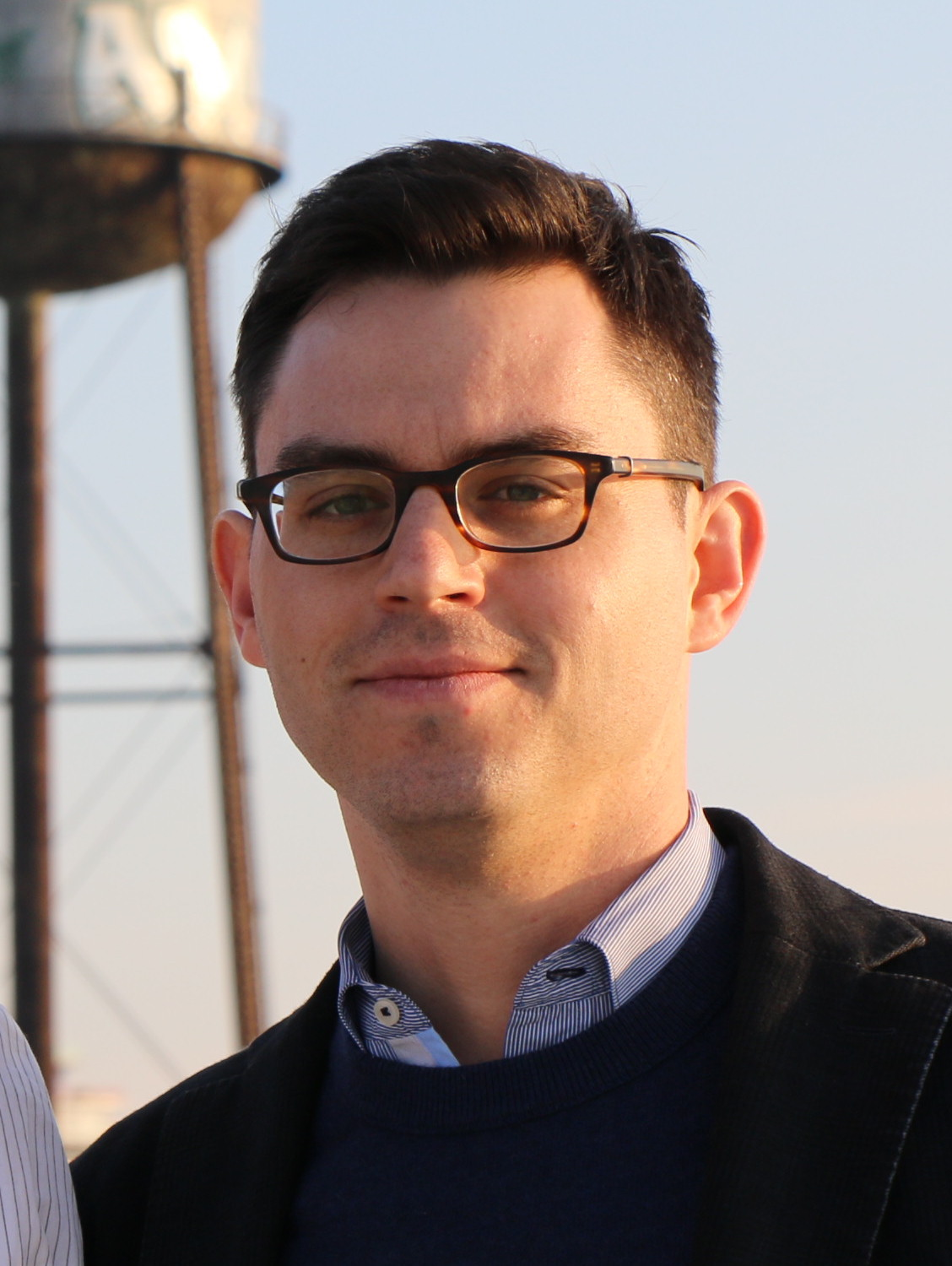
- Foer in 2013
- Born: September 23, 1982 (age 44); Washington, D.C., U.S.
- Education: Yale University
- Occupations: Journalist, writer
- Parent: Esther Safran Foer (mother)
- Relatives: Franklin Foer (brother); Jonathan Safran Foer (brother)
- Writing career
- Genre: Non-fiction
- Subjects: Science

Joshua Foer (born September 23, 1982) is a freelance journalist and author living in Brookline, Massachusetts, with a primary focus on science. He was the 2006 USA Memory Champion, which was described in his 2011 book, Moonwalking with Einstein: The Art and Science of Remembering Everything. He also co-founded the travel company Atlas Obscura with Dylan Thuras.

== Early life and education ==
Foer was born in Washington, D.C. He is the younger brother of former New Republic editor Franklin Foer and novelist Jonathan Safran Foer. He is the son of Esther Foer, former Director of Sixth & I Historic Synagogue, and Albert Foer, founder and former president of the think-tank American Antitrust Institute. He was born in Washington, D.C., and attended Georgetown Day School.

Foer graduated with a B.A. in ecology and evolutionary biology from Yale University in 2004.

== Career ==
In 2006, Foer won the USA Memory Championship, and set a new U.S. record in the "speed cards" event by memorizing a deck of 52 cards in 1 minute and 40 seconds. Foer's interest in competitive memory started a year earlier (2005) when he attended the USA Memory Championships as a journalist. He then studied under a British grandmaster of memory, Ed Cooke. Foer credits his sharp memory to creating memory palaces and the use of mnemonics, a learning technique that aids information retention or retrieval in the human memory. Foer participated only in the 2006 USA Memory Championships.

Foer's first book, Moonwalking with Einstein, was published by Penguin in March 2011. The book describes his journey throughout the world of competitive memory and attempts to delineate the capacity of the human mind. He received a $1.2 million advance for the book. Film rights were optioned by Columbia Pictures shortly after publication. The book was a finalist for the 2012 Royal Society Winton Prize for Science Books.

Foer's works have appeared in the New York Times, the Washington Post, Slate, The Nation, and The New Yorker. From 2007 to 2009, the quarterly art & culture journal Cabinet published Foer's column "A Minor History Of." The column "examines an overlooked cultural phenomenon using a timeline".

Foer also has an interest in wildlife journalism, and has written articles for National Geographic.

Foer is currently working on a book about his travels and experiences with the Mbendjele pygmies of the Congo Basin.

== Atlas Obscura ==
Foer co-founded Atlas Obscura in 2009. The company's mission is to inspire wonder and curiosity about the world. Foer is also the co-author of the #1 NYT bestselling book, Atlas Obscura: An Explorer's Guide to the World's Hidden Wonders. In late 2025, he was voted out of the company board alongside co-founder Dylan Thuras.

== Other organizations ==
Foer has founded several organizations, several of them dedicated to preserving Jewish traditions. In 2013, Foer co-founded the website Sefaria with Google developer Brett Lockspeiser, in order to transcribe, translate and digitize the core texts of Judaism. Since then, the website has grown to include a full digitization of the Talmud with a focus on connecting links to related texts within the Jewish faith. The organization recently announced plans to build similar website archives, starting with the preservation of central texts surrounding the American Revolution and United States democracy. Foer's other ventures include the organization of Sukkah City, a public art exhibition in Union Square, New York City that challenged artists and architects to reimagine the Jewish holiday tradition of building a sukkah in 2010. A documentary film directed by Jason Hutt was also made to depict and commemorate the event. Foer is also a board member of the Jim Joseph Foundation for Jewish education. In 2013, Foer was awarded a fellowship from the John Simon Guggenheim Memorial Foundation.

In addition, Foer founded the first Athanasius Kircher Society. It held only a single session in 2007, featuring Kim Peek and Col. Joe Kittinger.

== Bibliography ==
- Moonwalking with Einstein, Penguin Press HC, March 3, 2011, ISBN 978-1-59420-229-2
- Atlas Obscura: An Explorer's Guide to the World's Hidden Wonders, Workman Publishing Company, 2016, 2019 ISBN 978-1523506484 (co-written with Dylan Thuras and Ella Morton)
