= David Ewing Duncan =

American journalist

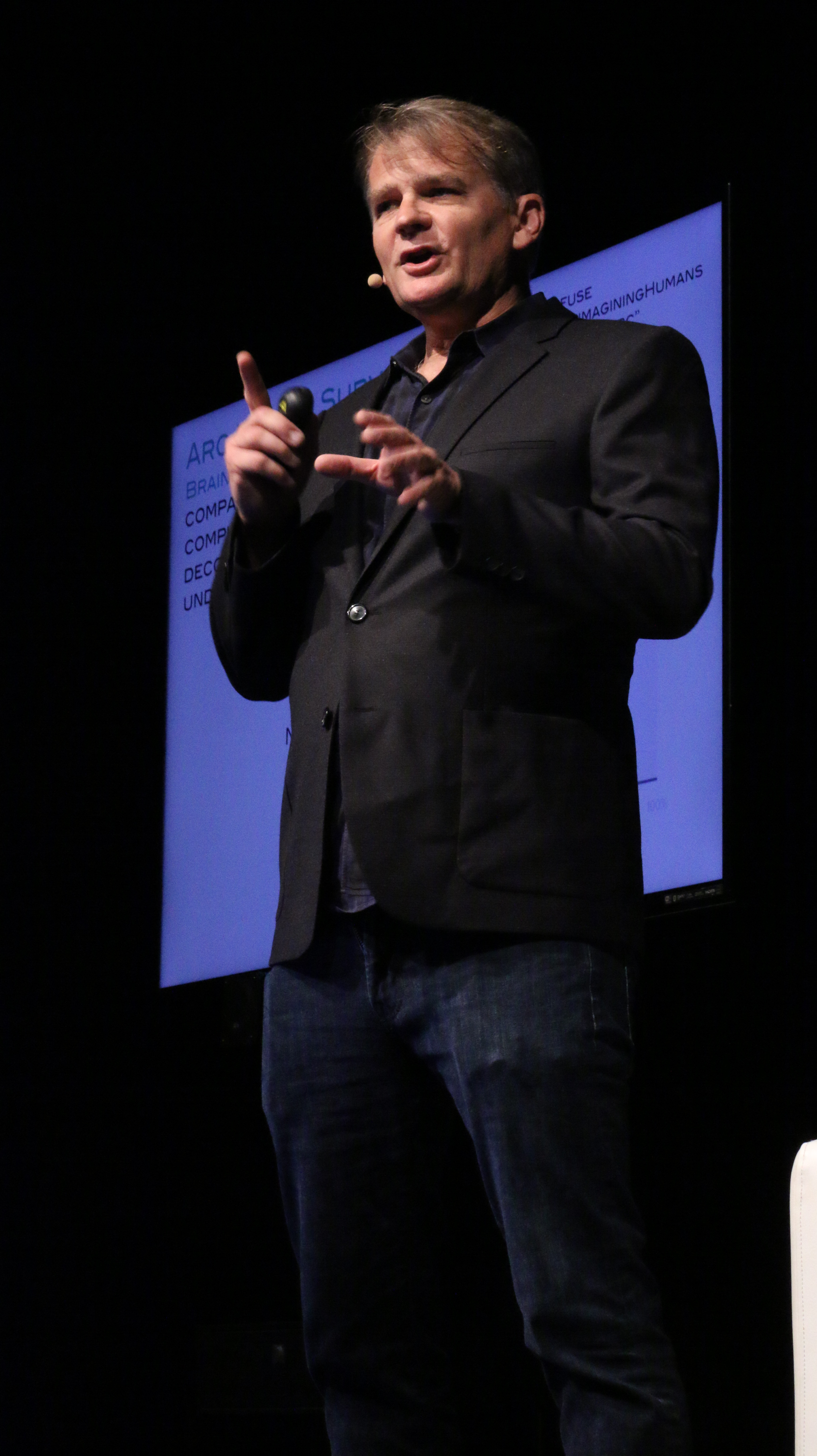
Duncan in 2016

David Ewing Duncan is an American journalist, author, and researcher on new discoveries and their implications for the life sciences. He also writes about robots and artificial intelligence. He is the author of 12 books and a journalist for Vanity Fair, Wired, Scientific American, The Atlantic, The New York Times, MIT Technology Review, National Geographic, and other publications.

He was a special correspondent and producer for Nightline, a commentator and producer for Morning Edition, and chief correspondent for Tech Nation on NPR. He is the co-founder and curator of Arc Fusion, which holds events around the world for leaders and thinkers on the fusion of health, information technology biomedicine, and on the future of humans. He is the creative director of Cure and recently was a health strategist-in-residence for IDEO.

== Early life and education ==
Duncan was born in Kansas City, Missouri, and grew up in Lake Quivira, Kansas. His father, Herbert Ewing Duncan, Jr., is an architect. His mother, Patricia DuBose Duncan, was an artist, photographer, and environmental activist whose work helped lead to the establishment of the Tallgrass Prairie National Preserve in 1996. He graduated from Vassar College, where he studied English literature and history.

== Career ==
Duncan worked for U.S. Senator John Danforth, (R-MO).

From 1981-83, he led The World Bike for Hope, a 14,000-mile, 23-nation bicycle trek around the world that raised money for Project Hope and led to his first book, Pedaling the Ends of the Earth. In 1986-87, he bicycled from Cape Town to Cairo in Africa, a voyage he chronicled for National Public Radio and in the book Cape to Cairo: An African Odyssey.

After cycling around the world and south to north through Africa in the 1980s, Duncan launched a career in journalism, writing for Life magazine and other publications, and serving as a commentator and contributor for NPR, mostly for Morning Edition. In 1993, he was appointed a special correspondent and producer for ABC Nightline, covering mostly healthcare and science. He wrote four books, a biography of the conquistador Hernando de Soto (A Savage Quest in the Americas); a history of time (The Calendar), Masterminds: Genius, DNA, and the Quest to Rewrite Life, a book about the pioneers of genetics and synthetic biology, and an investigative book, Residents: The Perils and Promise of Educating Young Doctors, addressing how doctors are trained based on a story in Harper’s.

In 1996, Nightline released a documentary, which tracked a 36-hour shift of a medical resident, based in part on his book. He co-produced documentaries for the Discovery Channel and later was a correspondent-producer for NOVA’s ScienceNow! on PBS. In 1998, he was hired by producer Elliott Kastner to write a screenplay adapted from Duncan’s biography of Hernando de Soto, set in the future in outer space.

In 2001, Duncan was one of the first humans to be genetically sequenced, which was reported on in the magazine Wired. He reported the results in a series of articles for Discover, The Atlantic, MIT Technology Review, Conde Nast Portfolio, Wired, and other media. This led to the publication of the book Experimental Man in 2009. He is currently at work on the Experimental Person Project, running new tests and updating his data to see what predictions were accurate and what the future might bring for his and everyone’s health. In 2011, he gave a TEDx Brussels talk that led to a TED book on longevity titled When I’m 164: The Science of Radical Life Extension and What Happens if it Succeeds. He continues to cover the science and implications of anti-aging and longevity.

Duncan also covered the business, politics, and ethics of biotechnology for Fortune, Atlantic, and others, and covered the rise of high tech in Silicon Valley. In 2001, his documentary on the dotcom boom and bust (GoldRush.com) tracked the rise and fall of a start-up and the frenzy of this era in the Bay Area that aired on ABC Nightline. From 2003 to 2008 he was co-founder, curator, and host of BioAgenda, a major gathering of leaders in the life sciences that was held most of those years in Palm Springs, California. In 2014, Duncan co-founded, curated, and hosted Arc Fusion events around the world. In 2012, he co-founded a genetic testing company based on his Experimental Man research that tested a person’s genetic sensitivity to environmental toxins like mercury.

In 2019, Duncan wrote Talking to Robots, a book of short stories that blended fiction and nonfiction and explored how technologies like AI and synthetic biology might turn out in the future. He also teamed up with geneticist Craig Venter to write The Voyages of Sorcerer II, about Venter’s expeditions on his sailboat-research vessel to delve into the invisible world of microbes that connect all life on Earth.

Duncan writes for Vanity Fair, Wired, Scientific American, The New York Times, Technology Review, and the Daily Beast. He is a former Contributing Editor to Wired, Discover, Condé Nast Portfolio and Technology Review. He also has written for The Atlantic, National Geographic, Fortune, Newsweek, Life, Outside, and Harper's, among many others. Duncan was a longtime commentator for NPR’s Morning Edition and was Chief Correspondent on public radio's "Biotech Nation,” part of "Tech Nation,” broadcast weekly out of KQED in San Francisco.

In television, he was a special producer and correspondent for ABC Nightline, and a special producer for ABC’s 20/20. He was a correspondent for NOVA’s Science Now, and a documentary co-producer for the Discovery Channel.

Duncan is a frequent speaker, and appears often in the media, including on the Today Show and NPR's All Things Considered, and Morning Edition.

== Nonprofit and academia ==
Duncan was the founding director of the Center for Life Science Policy at the University of California, Berkeley. He is the founder and former director of The BioAgenda Institute for Life Science Policy, a San Francisco-based nonprofit think-tank that held summits, panels and discussions, and sponsored white papers on important issues in the life sciences between 2003 and 2008. In 2011, he launched The Personalized Health Project, sponsored by The Ewing Marion Kauffman Foundation. He has served on a special communications committee at the National Academies of Science and is on the faculty of Singularity University and NextMed.

== Honors ==
Duncan has been awarded the "Magazine Story of the Year" award from the American Association for the Advancement of Science. His articles have been nominated three times for National Magazine Awards. His work appeared twice in The Best American Science and Nature Writing, and he has won other awards.

== Bibliography ==
- The Voyage of Sorcerer II: The Expedition that Unlocked the Secrets of the Ocean’s Microbiome co-author: J. Craig Venter (Harvard U Press; LittleBrownUK)
- Talking to Robots: Tales from our human-robot futures (2019-Dutton-Penguin)
- When I'm 164: The new science of radical life extension, and what happens if it succeeds (2012-TED Books)
- Life at All Costs (2010-Fiscal Times), a five-part series examining end of life care
- Experimental Man: What one man’s body reveals about his future, your health and our toxic world (2009-Wiley)
- Masterminds: Genius, DNA and Quest to Rewrite Life (2005-Harper-Collins)
- The Calendar: Humanity's Epic Struggle to Determine a True and Accurate Year (1999-Avon)
- Residents: The Perils and Promise of Training Young Doctors (1996-Scribner)
- Hernando de Soto: A Savage Quest in the Americas (1996-Random House)
- From Cape to Cairo: An African Odyssey (1989-Grove), about a journalist's stint in Africa and riding a bike from Cape Town to Cairo
- Pedaling the Ends of the Earth (1985-Simon & Schuster), about bicycling around the world

== Sources ==
- AAAS Science Journalism Awards - 2003 Recipients - David Ewing Duncan in aaas.org
