= Sonic Sphere =

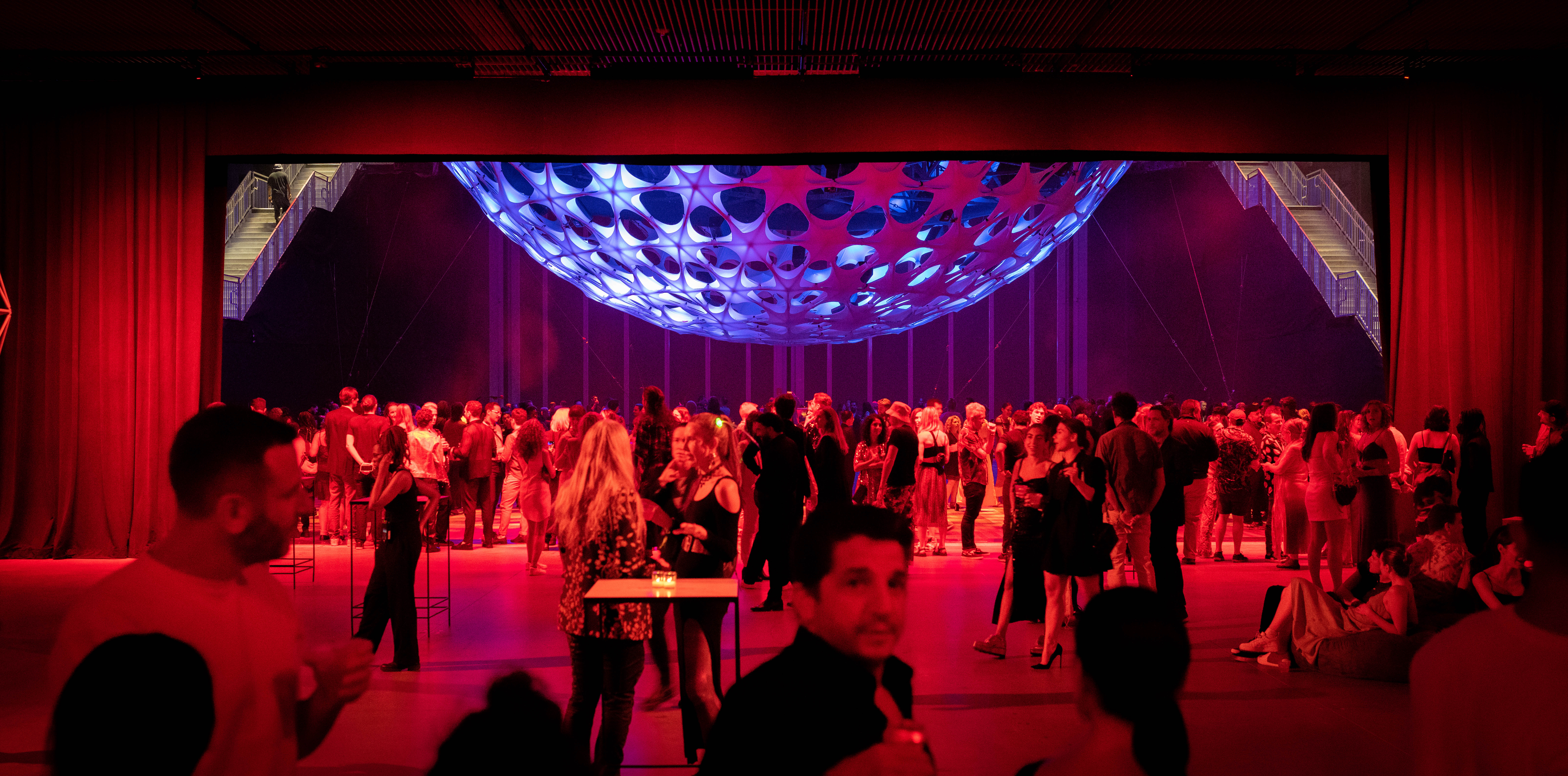

The Sonic Sphere is a multisensory, spherical concert hall that has been installed in various areas across the world since 2021.

The hall combines 3D light and sound within its live performances. It includes a large number of speakers, creating an immersive soundscape that surrounds the audience, along with lighting effects on the sphere's surface.

The design, inspired by Karlheinz Stockhausen's 1970 Kugelauditorium, features lounge-type seating and giant nets for guests to lie on.

== History and background ==
The Sonic Sphere was created by Ed Cooke (author), Merijn Royaards, and Nicholas Christie. The project has developed over a series of iterations, with the first version installed at the Chateau du Feÿ commune. The sphere has additionally appeared in London, Mexico, at Black Rock City, and in Miami.

== KA9 and KA10 ==
The 9th version of Sonic Sphere, known as KA9, was featured at Burning Man in 2022.

KA9 was upgraded and enhanced to appear at Love Burn in Miami in February 2023 as KA10.

== KA11 at The Shed, New York ==
The 11th iteration of this project, made its debut at The Shed in New York City's Hudson Yards in June 2023. The Sonic Sphere measures 65 feet in diameter and was suspended within The Shed's 115-foot-tall McCourt space. KA11 included 124 loudspeakers surrounding up to 250 people with sound from all directions.

The artists that exhibited at the Sonic Sphere in New York included Steve Reich, with his work "Music for 18 Musicians." Additionally, the event featured listening sessions of music remixed for spatial sound design, such as The xx's debut album from 2009. DJs Yaeji and Carl Craig contributed playlists, and pianist Igor Levit performed Morton Feldman's "Palais de Mari," accompanied by visuals from Rirkrit Tiravanija.
