= Chester Santos =

American mnemonist

- Occupations: Memory Expert; Motivational Speaker
- Known for: 2008 USA Memory Champion

Chester Santos is a memory expert and motivational speaker best known for winning the USA Memory Championship. He has been profiled in numerous publications and media outlets such as The New York Times, The Wall Street Journal, The Washington Post, NBC, CBS, CNN, PBS, Business Week, USA Today, Yahoo! News, Google News, Wired magazine, Reuters and Sports Illustrated. His interview with CNN was featured on the VH1 show “The Best Week Ever”.

In an October 2012 episode of NOVA scienceNOW entitled “How Smart Can We Get”, Santos trained New York Times columnist and CBS News correspondent David Pogue in ways to improve his memory. In November 2012, as part of the university's Superior Memory Project, researchers from Washington University in St. Louis put Santos through a battery of tests designed to “unlock the secrets of his brain.” His participation included completing a series of tests designed to probe his memorization abilities and limitations.

Santos appeared in a July 2013 episode of Memory Games, a series produced by the Science Channel.

== Early life ==
Santos grew up in Hanford, California. He attended Fresno City College before transferring to the University of California at Berkeley, where he earned a bachelor's in Psychology.

== Career ==
Santos placed in the top five at the USA Memory Championship from 2005-2010, with two third places in 2005 and 2007; and a second-place finish in 2006. He won the 2008 USA Memory Championship and represented the United States at the 17th World Memory Championship, which was held in Bahrain.

Santos is the creator of the memory-training Steel Trap iPhone application. SteelTrap reached the number two ranking for downloads of Educational applications and was the 47th most downloaded application overall in the Apple iTunes store on June 6, 2010.

In March 2012, while performing before a crowd in New York City, Santos demonstrated memory of all 435 members of the United States House of Representatives, their party, their state, which district they represent and the committees they sit on. Santos has also memorized every Kentucky Derby result since 1875 including the winning horse, jockey and time to one hundredth of a second. He has memorized the Academy Awards’ Best Picture winners for every year since 1927.

He was a featured speaker at the 2012 MLOVE ConFestival Europe.

Santos can memorize a shuffled deck of cards in three minutes. He can also remember 100 new faces and names in 15 minutes. He remembered 24 new faces and names in under five minutes in an interview with NBC News.

== Regimen and technique ==
Santos works on memory and recall for thirty minutes a day. His training increases in length, up to multiple hours a day, as he prepares for competitions. Santos also incorporates aerobic exercise into his training regimen.

Santos uses multiple mnemonic techniques including using the phonetic alphabet and various visualization techniques. One visualization technique is called the Roman room, in which an individual associates pieces of information with objects in a familiar space. A similar technique Santos also uses is called the journey technique, where a person associates pieces of information with points of interest along a familiar or known route. When associating pieces of information with objects or points of interest, Santos engages as many senses as possible to increase memory retention. A third visualization technique used by Santos is the called the body list, where pieces of information are associated with parts of the body.

Santos associates a person's name with a memorable image when remembering faces and names. He then associates that image with a notable or memorable physical characteristic of that person.
