= Nelson Dellis =

Memory athlete (born 1984)

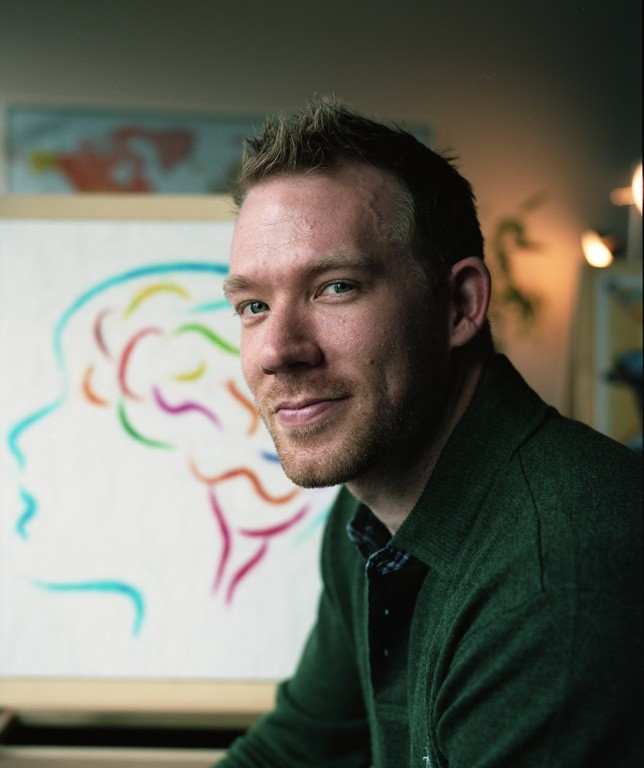

Personal information
- Full name: Nelson Charles Dellis
- Nationality: American, British
- Born: February 4, 1984 (age 42) Wimbledon, UK
- Education: University of Miami (B.S. in Physics, M.S. in Computer Science)
- Occupations: Mnemonist, Mountaineer, Public Speaker, Consultant
- Years active: 2009-present
- Website: www.nelsondellis.com, www.climb4memory.org

Sport
- Sport: Memory
- Rank: No. 81 (Jul. 2020), Grand Master of Memory

Achievements and titles
- World finals: 7th place (2012), 12th place (2013), 8th place (2014), 23rd place (2015)
- National finals: W (2011, 2012, 2014, 2015, 2021, 2024), F (2010, 2013, 2018, 2019, 2020)
- Highest world ranking: No. 21 (Oct. 2011)
- Personal bests: 15 min Names & Faces: 235 names (2019, NR); 15 min Random Words: 255 words (2014); Speed Cards: 40.65 sec (2012); Speed Numbers: 339 digits (2013)

Nelson Charles Dellis (born February 4, 1984) is an American memory athlete and consultant. He is a six-time USA Memory Champion, holding the record for most wins of the national memory champion title. He is also one of the co-founders of Memory League (formerly, Extreme Memory Tournament). Nelson also runs Climb 4 Memory - a nonprofit which "aims to raise funds and awareness for Alzheimer's disease research through mountain climbs around the world."

== Personal life ==
Dellis was born in Wimbledon, UK, to a Belgian mother and a French father, and grew up in England, France, and the United States. He attended high school at Gulliver Preparatory School in Miami, Florida. After graduation, he went on to attend the University of Miami, where he graduated with a major in physics and a minor in mathematics. He then earned a master's degree in computer science, also from the University of Miami, and wrote his thesis on automated reasoning. He is a mountain climber who has climbed on four expeditions to Mount Everest, and has scaled Alaska's Denali along with other mountains around the world.

== Mental athletics ==
Dellis was originally inspired to improve his memory after seeing the decline of his grandmother's memory due to Alzheimer's disease, and entered his first memory competition in 2009. He has since placed in a number of competitions as well as broken numerous memory records (see below).

Dellis was featured in the 2012 documentary Ben Franklin Blowing Bubbles at a Sword: The Journey of a Mental Athlete. He also appeared in the Science Channel program Memory Games in July 2013, which covered the 2013 US Memory Championships. He has also been interviewed regarding memory training on Today, The Dr. Oz Show, and Nightline.

== Notable competitions ==
=== 2010 ===
- USA Memory Championship (Mar. 6, New York City, US): 3rd place overall. Dellis broke the US record for memorizing the most numbers in 5 minutes: 178 digits.
- Friendly (Cambridge) Memory Championship (May 2, Cambridge, UK): 2nd place overall. Dellis broke US records in all 10 disciplines at this event, raising the international standard for American competitors in memory sports.

=== 2011 ===
- USA Memory Championship (Mar. 7, New York City, US): 1st place overall. Dellis broke the US record for memorizing the most numbers in 5 minutes: 248 digits, and the fastest to memorize a deck of cards: 66 seconds.
- UK Open Memory Championship (Aug. 25-26, London, UK): 2nd place overall.
- German Open Memory Championship (Sept. 16-17, Heilbronn, Germany): 6th place overall.

=== 2012 ===
- USA Memory Championship (Mar. 24, New York City, US): 1st place overall. Dellis broke the US record for memorizing the most numbers in 5 minutes: 303 digits, the fastest to memorize a deck of cards: 66 seconds, and the most names memorized in 15 minutes: 162 names. Dellis was the first and only (as of Feb. 17, 2017) mental athlete to win all four events in the morning part of the competition, getting a perfect 400 total points across four events
- World Memory Championships (Dec. 14-16, London, UK): 7th place overall. Dellis broke the US international record, at this event, for memorizing a deck of cards in the fastest time: 40.65 seconds .

He also received the title of international Grand Master of Memory, the highest title bestowed by the World Memory Sports Council, at this event.

=== 2013 ===
- USA Memory Championship (Mar. 24, New York City, US): 2nd place overall.
- World Memory Championships (Nov. 30-Dec. 2, London, UK): 12th place overall. Dellis broke the US international record, at this event, for memorizing the most digits in 5 minutes: 339 digits.

=== 2014 ===
- USA Memory Championship (Mar. 29, NYC, New York): 1st place overall. Dellis broke the US record for memorizing the most numbers in 5 minutes: 310 digits, and the most names memorized in 15 minutes: 193 names.
- World Memory Championships (Dec. 11-14, Haikou, China): 9th place overall. At this event, Dellis broke the US international record for most words memorized in 15 minutes: 255 words, and the US international record for most international names memorized in 15 minutes: 125 names.

=== 2015 ===
- USA Memory Championship (Mar. 29, NYC, New York): 1st place overall. Dellis broke the US record for memorizing the most names memorized in 15 minutes: 201 names. After the championship win, Dellis became only the second America memory athlete to win four US titles.
- UK Open Memory Championship (Aug. 27-28, London, UK): 6th place overall.
- World Memory Championships (Dec. 16-18, Chengdu, China): 23rd place overall.

=== 2016 ===
- Memoriad (Nov. 8-10, Las Vegas, NV): gold: Names & Faces, bronze: Speed Reading. He also set an Olympic Memory Record for memorizing the most names in 15 minutes: 198 names.
- UK Memory League Championship (Nov. 19-20, London, UK): 2nd place overall/finals runner-up.

=== 2019 ===
- USA Memory Championship (Apr. 28, Harrisburg, Pennsylvania): 2nd place overall. Dellis broke the US record for memorizing the most names memorized in 15 minutes: 235 names, a record which he had previously held a year prior.

=== 2021 ===
- USA Memory Championship (Oct. 23, Orlando, Florida): 1st place overall. Dellis won his fifth title breaking the record for winning the most USA Memory Championship titles.

=== 2024 ===
- USA Memory Championship (Sep. 28, Winter Park, Florida): 1st place overall.

== Records ==
As of Oct. 28, 2019, Dellis held 3 American records. He was the first American to memorize a deck of cards at an international competition in under 60 seconds. He was also the second American to achieve the Grand Master of Memory title.

Dellis holds a number of memory records, including the US national record for memorizing the most names in 15 minutes, 235 names. He also is the former record holder for memorizing a deck of shuffled cards in 63 seconds as well as for memorizing the most digits in 5 minutes, with 339 digits memorized. He is also ranked 15th in the world for memorizing a deck of cards, with a time of 40.65 seconds, one of the fastest times for an American in an international competition. He currently ranks 50th in the world as a memory athlete.

== Career ==
Before becoming involved in memory athletics, Dellis worked as a software developer for Wolfram Research. He also worked as a Veterinary Technician and as a Vedic Mathematics (mental math) teacher at Math Monkey of Pinecrest in Miami. In Chicago, he worked at a local yarn shop, experimenting with large scale knitting projects. He now works as a public speaker and memory consultant, giving talks on his climbs as well as holding seminars about memory techniques. Dellis also co-founded Memory League (formerly, Extreme Memory Tournament), a type of competitive memory platform that allows memory enthusiasts to challenge each other online. He has also authored numerous books: a children's picture book called "I Forgot Something (but I can't remember what it was)" (2016) designed to teach children the basics of memory techniques, "Remember It! The Names of People You Meet, All of Your Passwords, Where You Left Your Keys, and Everything Else You Tend to Forget" (2018), a memory technique, how-to book for the everyday person, and "Memory Superpowers!: An Adventurous Guide to Remembering What You Don’t Want to Forget" (2020), a memory technique how-to book for kids in school.

== Charity work ==
In 2010, Dellis founded Climb for Memory, a charity organization that raises money for Alzheimer's research through sponsored mountain climbs undertaken by Dellis. Fusion-io sponsored an ascent of Everest in 2013, following up on a 2011 attempt in which Dellis had to turn back 280 feet from the summit due to equipment failure. He also attempted Everest in 2016 but turned around at the South Col because of developing HAPE. In 2021, Nelson made another attempt on Everest, reaching 8300 meters before turning around.

== Media Appearances ==
Nelson was a contestant on Superhuman, the American version of The Brain, making it to the finals of his episode by memorizing bank vault codes and then having to open them from memory, while being suspended from the ceiling.

Nelson has been featured in The Wall Street Journal, The New Yorker, Mashable, CNN, Yahoo!, Lifehacker, Vital Signs with Dr. Sanjay Gupta, Today, Men's Health, among others.

In 2012, Nelson began production for a documentary called Memory Games with Emmy Award-winning director Janet Tobias. The documentary premiered in New York in November 2018. Memory Games was bought by Netflix and launched on June 19, 2019.

Nelson was featured in the 2019 season of the Netflix series Unnatural Selection. In the show, geneticist Preston Estep says it is important to obtain genomic information from extraordinary people. Dr. Estep tests Nelson's recall abilities using playing cards and DNA, and then the two tour a genetics lab and observe large DNA sequencing machines as they discuss sequencing Nelson's genome.

== Bibliography ==
- Remember It!: The Names of People You Meet, All of Your Passwords, Where You Left Your Keys, and Everything Else You Tend to Forget, Abrams Books Press HC, September 25, 2018, ISBN 978-1-41973-256-0
- Memory Superpowers!: An Adventurous Guide to Remembering What You Don’t Want to Forget, Abrams Books for Young Readers, August 18, 2020, ISBN 978-1-41973-187-7

== See also ==
- World Memory Championships
- USA Memory Championship
- Grand Master of Memory
- Memory sport
- Mnemonist
