= Moonwalking with Einstein =

2011 book by Joshua Foer

Moonwalking with Einstein: The Art and Science of Remembering Everything
- Author: Joshua Foer
- Language: English
- Subject: Memory; Mnemonics
- Genre: Nonfiction
- Publisher: Penguin Books
- Publication date: 3 March 2011
- Publication place: United States
- Media type: Print (Hardcover) audiobook ebook
- Pages: 320
- ISBN: 978-1-59420-229-2
- LC Class: BF385 .F64 2011

Moonwalking with Einstein: The Art and Science of Remembering Everything is a non-fiction book by Joshua Foer, first published in 2011. It debuted at number 3 on the New York Times bestseller list and stayed on the list for 8 weeks.

== Synopsis ==
Foer describes his book as participatory journalism in the world of competitive memorization and attempts to delineate the capacity of the human mind. He sets out to investigate the underpinnings of those with enhanced memory, soon finding himself at the 2005 USA Memory Championship. He covers the scientific basis of memory creation and historical attitudes towards memory, including its negative reputation in the Western educational system, a perception which Foer is largely opposed to. He explores common mnemonic tools for improving memory: the techniques of Roman rhetoricians and the tannaim ("reciters") of Judea, the Major System and the PAO System for memorizing numbers and cards, and mind mapping, a note-taking technique developed by Tony Buzan. These methods are all a form of the method of loci, in which data is stored in a sequence of memorable images that can be translated back into their original form. He espouses deliberate practice as the path to expertise, and declares psychological barriers as the largest obstacles to improved human performance.

The book describes the prodigious memory and 87-point IQ of Kim Peek, the inspiration for the 1988 movie Rain Man.

Foer discusses how Daniel Tammet's index finger slides around on a table as he performs mental calculations in a documentary; mental multiplication experts and mnemonists that Foer speaks with imply that Tammet's claims, involving synesthetic morphing shapes and colors standing in for complex numerical feats, are questionable. World memory champion Ben Pridmore tells Foer that "[t]here are a lot of people in the world that can do those things."

Foer notes that Tammet, competing under his previous legal name "Daniel Corney", won the gold medal at the World Memory Championships' "Names and Faces" event. Tammet had tested poorly in facial recognition under Simon Baron-Cohen's assessment of synesthetic abilities; Foer states that poor facial recognition ability is a suitable indicator of inborn "savant" status, as opposed to "savant-like tricks [developed] through methodical training".

He also discovers self-promotional forum posts advertising "mind power and advanced memory skills" courses as well as psychic phone readings (the latter under the pseudonym "Daniel Andersson"). In a cached version of "danieltammet.com", Foer finds Tammet relating details omitted from his autobiography Born on a Blue Day:

My own interest in memory and conversely memory sport was sparked by ... a children's book on broad memory concepts for better exam performance at the age of 15. The following year I passed my GCSEs with some of the year's best results and subsequently performed well at A-level, mastering French and German along the way with the help of these tried-and-tested techniques ... My obsession with the sport grew, and following months of strenuous training and hard work I climbed into the World's Top-5 rated memory sportsmen.

— Foer, Moonwalking with Einstein: The Art and Science of Remembering Everything

Foer interviews Tammet on several occasions over the course of several weeks, during which he confronts him with the forum posts. Foer also tests Tammet:

I read back to him the descriptions he'd given me of 9,412 the last two times I'd seen him. They could hardly have been more different. I told him my theory, which I realized would be very difficult to prove: that he was using the same basic techniques as other mental athletes, and that he invented these far-out synesthetic descriptions of numbers to mask the fact that he had memorized a simple image to associate with each of the two-digit combinations from 00 to 99—one of the most basic techniques in the mnemonist's tool kit.

— Foer, Moonwalking with Einstein: The Art and Science of Remembering Everything

Foer, with the coaching of Ed Cooke, practises traditional memory techniques for a year, winning the 2006 USA Memory Championship and breaking the U.S. record in speed cards. He goes on to represent the US at the World Memory Championships in London, placing thirteenth and winning bronze in the "Names and Faces" event, but failing to become a Grand Master of Memory.

== Reception ==
Bill Gates has called the book "absolutely phenomenal". Claire Lambrecht for Salon writes: "Foer talks with people from both spectrums of the memory divide—from Kim Peek to the guy dubbed "The Most Forgetful Man in the World"—and their conversations offer insight into the relevance of memory in a society increasingly dominated by smart phones, Google, and Wikipedia." Alexandra Horowitz for the New York Times called the book "engaging", though she does take issue with how Foer "inexplicably" attacks Daniel Tammet. Ultimately, Horowitz concludes that "Foer is too engaging to put us off. His assemblage of personal mnemonic images is riotous. He makes suspenseful an event animated mostly by the participants' 'dramatic temple massaging.'" Michiko Kakutani, in the New York Times, called the book "captivating".

Peter Conrad in The Observer dismissed Foer's account as reality TV in book form, stating: "After performing the tricks required of him, he is ushered off into oblivion; by telling the story all over again five years later, he is hoping to prolong his meagre allocation of fame and persuade the world to remember his name. But I have too much on my mind, and now intend to exercise my prerogative as a thinker by forgetting him." Elizabeth Loftus, writing in the Wall Street Journal, called the book "uplifting", saying that "It shows that with motivation, focus and a few clever tricks, our minds can do rather extraordinary things."
