= Sukkah City =

2010 collaborative art project

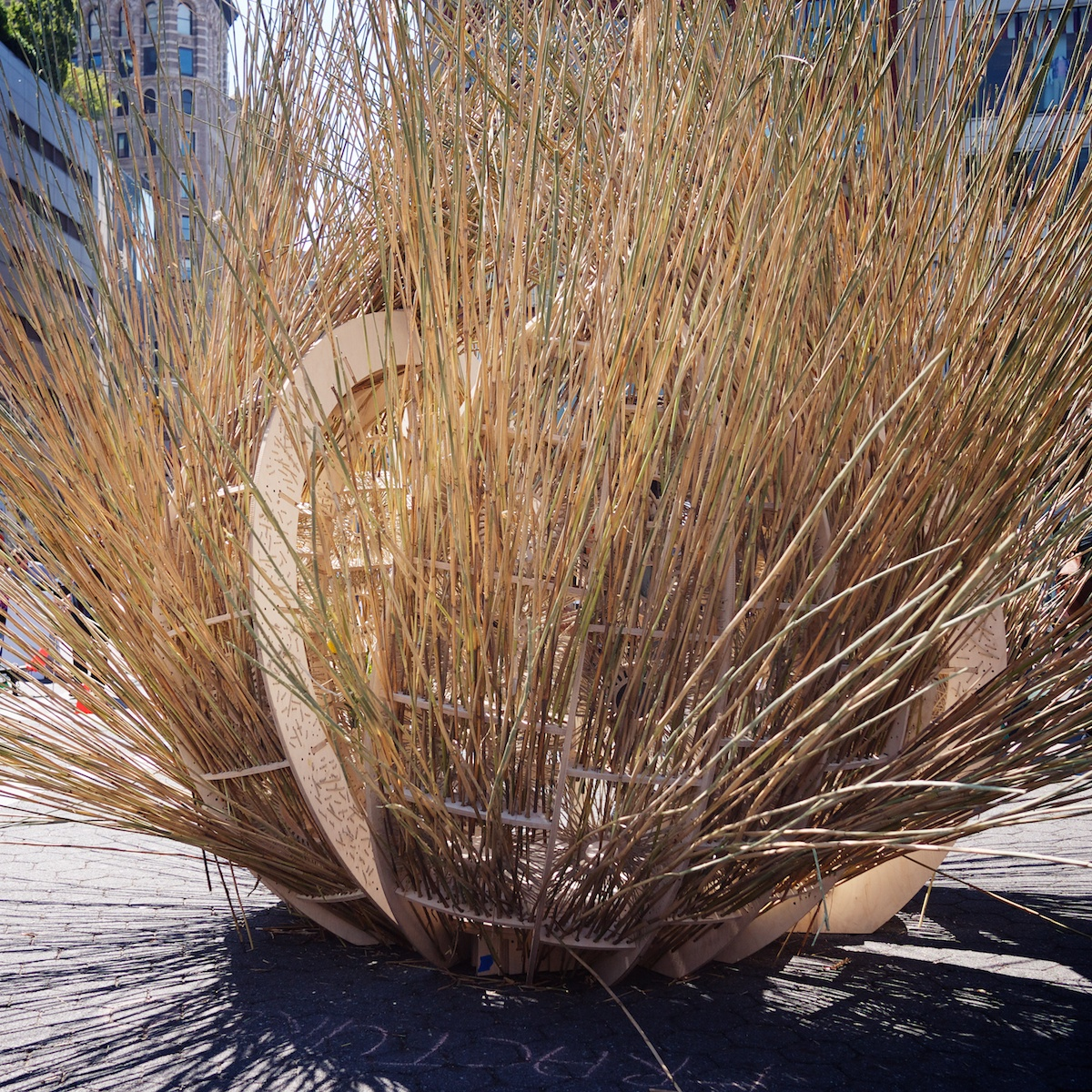
"Fractured Bubble", awarded "the people's choice" sukkah.

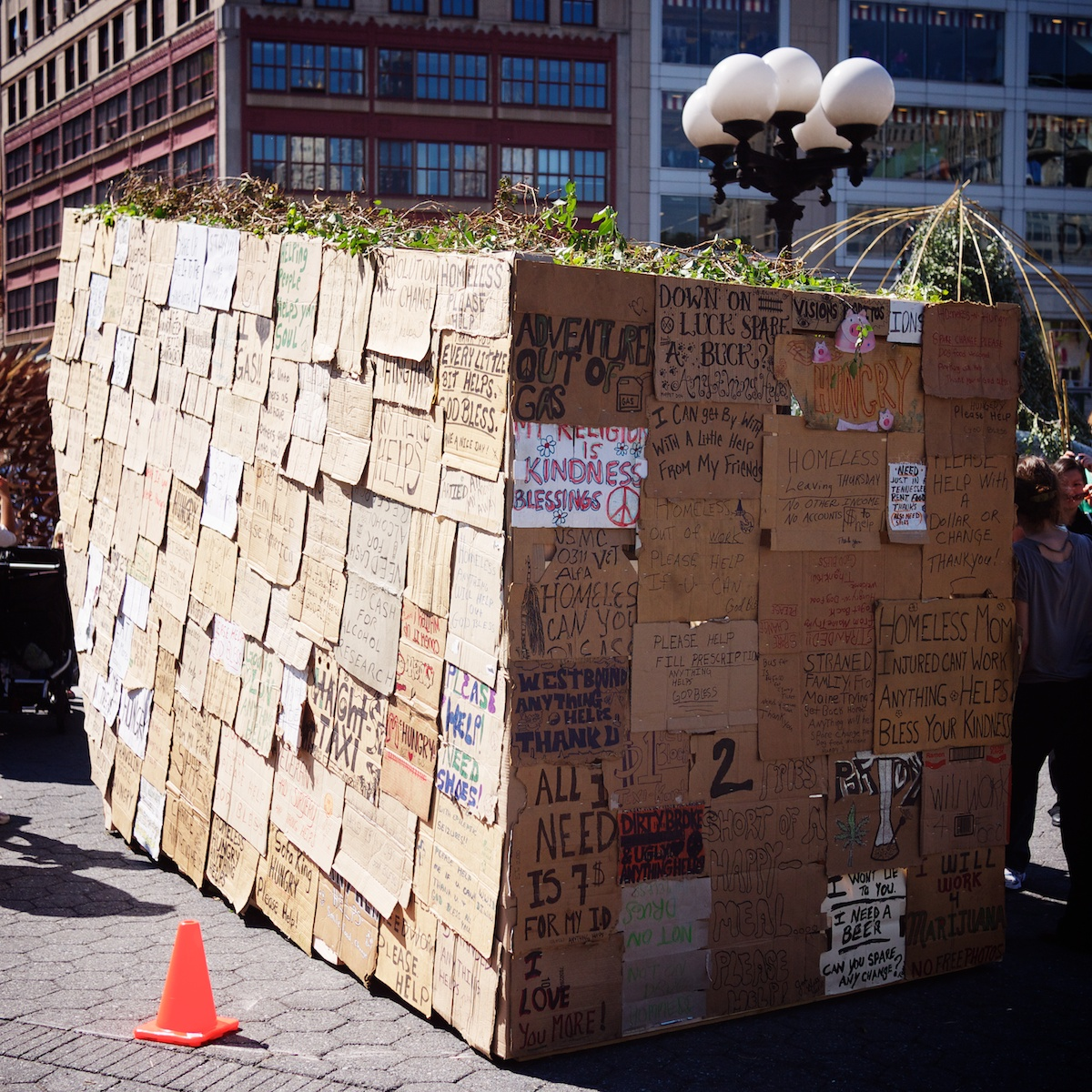
Sukkah of the Signs by Ronald Rael and Virginia San Fratello

Sukkah City was an architectural design competition and work of installation art planned in partnership with the Union Square Partnership for New York City's Union Square Park in September 2010.

== Overview ==
A sukkah is a structure described in the Torah and used in celebrating the Jewish holiday of Sukkot. The Torah instructed the Children of Israel to commemorate their Exodus from Ancient Egypt by dwelling for seven days every autumn in temporary structures reminiscent of those in which they lived during their 40 years of wandering the desert before settling in the Land of Israel. Many Jews continue this practice. The Sukkah City competition and installation aimed to re-imagine the sukkah in contemporary design.

Journalists Joshua Foer and Roger Bennett conceived the competition, and Reboot, an organization that promotes Jewish culture (and which Bennett co-founded), sponsored it.

A committee of art critics and architects selected 12 winners from a field of over 600 entries. The twelve winning entries were constructed at Brooklyn's Gowanus Studio Space, and driven by truck to Union Square Park for display on September 19 and 20, 2010, from dawn to dusk. The design chosen as "the people's choice" stood, starting on September 22, 2010, for the seven days of the Jewish holiday of Sukkot. Some entries were also selected for display at the Center for Architecture in New York City during September.

Sukkah City competition was to be documented in a book, Sukkah City: Radically Temporary Architecture for the Next 3000 Years. However, the book has yet to be published.

Sukkah City, a 2013 documentary film about the competition directed by Jason Hutt, is distributed by First Run Features and is available for purchase or rental on YouTube, Amazon, Kanopy and other sources.

== The competition ==
The competition was launched with an announcement in May 2010. By June hundreds of architects, artists, and designers had entered. The deadline for entries was August 1, 2010.

The jury included Rick Bell, Executive Director of the New York Chapter of the American Institute of Architects, Geoff Manaugh, a senior editor at Dwell magazine, architecture critic Paul Goldberger designer Ron Arad, architect Thom Mayne, winner of the Pritzker Prize, Michael Arad, Allan Chochinov, Matias Corea, Steven Heller, Natalie Jeremijenko, Maira Kalman, Thomas de Monchaux, Ada Tolla and Adam Yarinsky. The rabbinic adviser was Dani Passow.

Foer expects the entries to range from "the latest in digital fabrication to handmade craft techniques."

During the period when the 12 winners stood in the park, visitors were able to vote for their favorite design.

The "People’s Choice Award" sukkah was entitled Fractured Bubble, and was designed by Henry Grosman and Babak Bryan.

=== Design requirements ===
The contest's rules required entries to conform to Jewish law governing the sukkah:

- It must be a temporary structure.
- The roof must be made of non-edible plant material.
- The roof must be thick enough to shade those sitting inside in daytime, and thin enough so that stars are visible through the roof at night.
- The walls must be at least 10 handsbreadth tall, but can be made of any material. The body of a dead whale can serve as a wall.
- The sukkah can also be built atop a live camel.

According to competition organizer Joshua Foer:

The sukkah is a space to ceremonially practice homelessness.... In that sense it is an architecture of both memory and empathy—memory of the huts the Israelites dwelled in during their exodus from Egypt long ago, and empathy for those who live today without solid shelter over their heads. It goes up in the fall, just when it's no longer entirely comfortable to be outside.

One of the winning entries, the Sukkah of the Signs designed by architects Ronald Rael and Virginia San Fratello, clad the sukkah structure with several hundred homeless signs collected from the homeless around the United States.
