= Paula S. Apsell =

American television producer

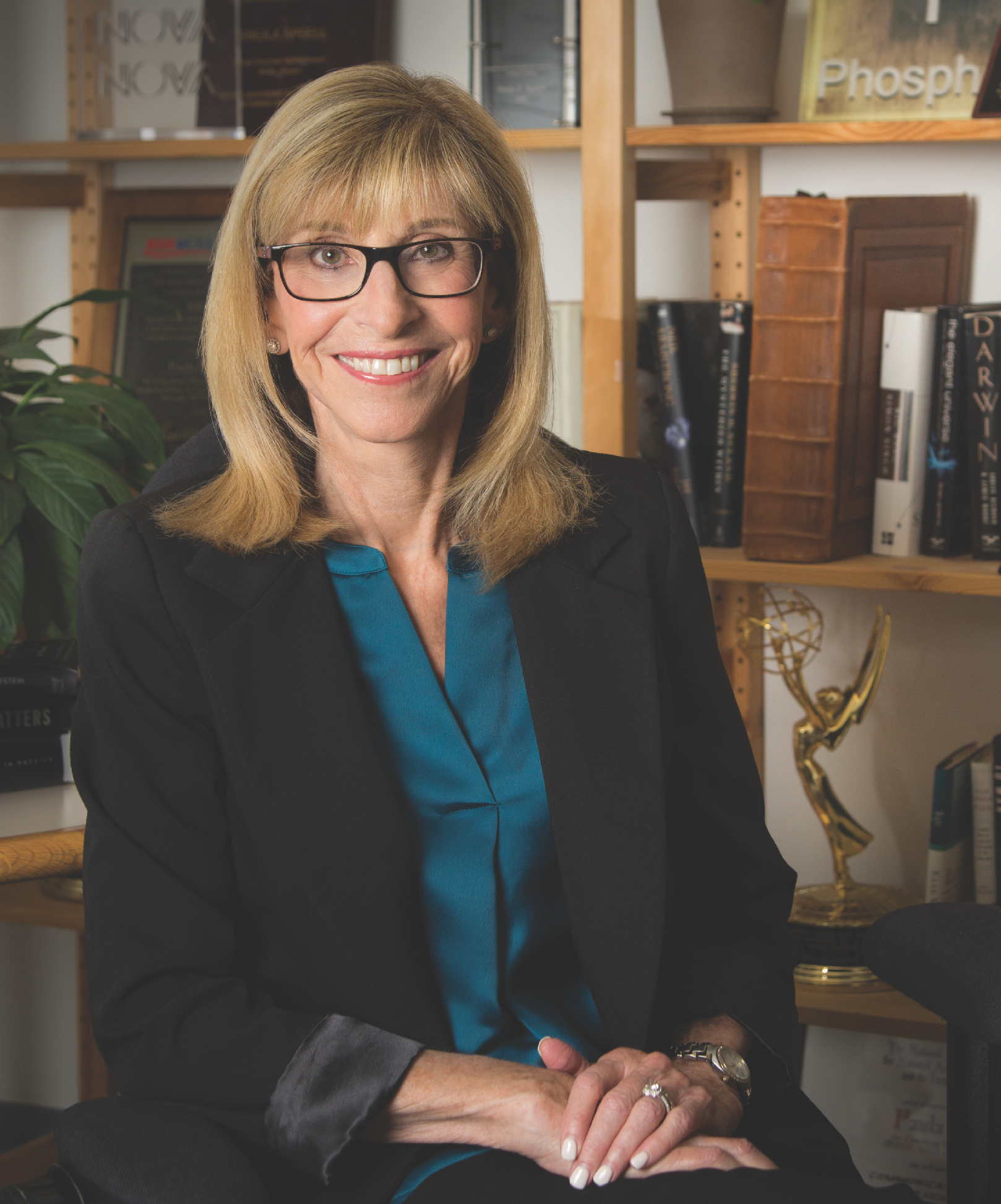
- Born: July 4, 1947 (age 79); Lynn, Massachusetts
- Other name: Paula Schwartz Apsell
- Occupations: Executive producer, NOVA

Paula S. Apsell (born July 4, 1947) is the television Executive Producer Emerita of PBS's NOVA and was director of the WGBH Science Unit.

Among Apsell's signature award-winning NOVA productions are "The Elegant Universe" with Dr. Brian Greene, "Einstein's Big Idea" narrated by John Lithgow, and "Rx for Survival" in conjunction with Vulcan Productions.

Apsell is widely considered among the most influential journalists in science communications and education in the U.S. and abroad.

== Early life ==
On July 4, 1947, Apsell was born in Lynn, Massachusetts. Apsell grew up in Marblehead, Massachusetts and graduated from Marblehead High School. Her father, David Schwartz, was a navigator in World War II and her mother, Evelyn, opened the first consignment clothing store in Massachusetts. Her grandfather was a cobbler and an immigrant from Kiev.

== Education ==
In 1969, Apsell graduated from Brandeis University with a degree in psychology.

In 1983-84, MIT awarded her the Vannevar Bush Fellowship in the Public Understanding of Science. She studied evolutionary biology, and health policy among other topics.

Apsell received an Honorary Doctor of Humane Letters degree from Southern Methodist University "for her central role in enhancing public understanding of science" and another from Dickinson College in Carlisle, Pennsylvania.

== Career ==
Apsell's career began in broadcasting at WGBH. Apsell is an executive producer and film director.

Paula Apsell began her broadcasting career right out of college at Boston's WGBH station when she was hired to type and distribute the stations daily program logs. Within a year she was hired at WGBH radio where she developed the award-winning children's series "The Spiders Web." She also served as an on-air newsreader and statehouse reporter for WGBH radio.

In 1975, Apsell switched over to WGBH-TV as a production assistant for NOVA's second season. One of Apsell's first productions was NOVA "Death of a Disease" which was the first long-form documentary on the eradication of smallpox. In the late 1970s Apsell was producing documentaries on artificial intelligence and genetic engineering; topics that rarely existed in the mainstream prior to the 21st century.

In 1981, Apsell went to Boston's ABC affiliate, WCVB, and was a producer for medical correspondent Dr. Timothy Johnson. At WCVB, Apsell produced "Someone I Once Knew," a groundbreaking program essentially introducing the story of Alzheimer's disease and dementia into the public sphere.

Apsell was asked to take over the top post at NOVA in 1985 where she remained for the three-and-a-half decades. Among Apsell's most notable NOVA's include "The Miracle of Life" sequel "Life's Greatest Miracle," "The Fabric of the Cosmos" with Brian Greene, and "Making North America" with Dr. Kirk Johnson. Other of Apsell's acclaimed productions are the giant-screen films "Shackleton's Antarctic Adventure" and "Special Effects" which was nominated for an Academy Award.

In 2005, Apsell launched a NOVA spin-off series, NOVAScienceNow hosted first by Dr. Neil De Grasse Tyson and later by technology journalist David Pogue.

In 2011, in addition to overseeing the NOVA franchise, Apsell taught science communications at the Kavli Institute for Theoretical Physics at the University of California Santa Barbara.

In October 2018, Paula Apsell received the Lifetime Achievement Emmys Award from the National Association of Television Arts and Sciences. Apsell is the first science journalist to receive this award.

On May 21, 2019, WGBH announced that Apsell would be named Senior Executive Producer Emerita. WGBH also announced an annual scholarship in her name in recognition of Apsell's career achievements in science broadcasting, communication, and education. The Paula S. Apsell/WGBH STEM Boston Public School Scholarship will be granted to Boston public school students. Following her departure from NOVA, Apsell became CEO of Leading Edge Productions and started producing The Resistance Project, a documentary about Jewish resistance to the Holocaust.

Apsell is a fellow at the American Association for the Advancement of Science (AAAS) and served a full term on the Smithsonian National Museum of Natural History board.

Apsell is a public speaker, moderator, and lecturer at WGBH member stations, universities nationwide, film and science festivals such as Sundance and the Aspen Ideas Festival and conferences such as TEDx.

== Awards ==
- 1994 Boston Museum of Science Bradford Washburn Award for her career contributions to science journalism.
- Carl Sagan Award given by the Council of Scientific Society Presidents
- 2007 Planetary Society's Cosmos Award
- International Documentary Association's Pioneer Award
- Gold Baton, the highest honor of the annual Alfred I. duPont-Columbia University Awards
- Peabody Awards - "The Elegant Universe," "Judgment Day: Intelligent Design on Trial," "Odyssey of Life"
- 2001 Emmy Award for NOVA's "BioTerror"
- Emmy Award - "Shackleton's Voyage of Endurance"
- 2002 Emmy Award - "Why the Towers Fell"
- Emmy Award - "The Elegant Universe"
- George Foster Peabody Award - "The Elegant Universe"
- 2005 Emmy Award - "Rx for Survival: A Global Health Challenge"
- 2009 Emmy Award in the Outstanding Informational Programming - "A Walk to Beautiful"
- 2014 Outstanding News & Documentary Emmy Award for Outstanding Science And Technology Programming.
- 2016 Prix Galien USA Award. Presented by Dr. Roy Vagelos.
- 2018 Lifetime Achievement Emmy which was presented by PBS president Paula Kerger

== NOVA programs ==
"Holocaust Escape Tunnel", 2016

"D-Day’s Sunken Secrets", 2014

"Cold Case JFK", 2013

"Engineering Ground Zero", 2012

"Judgment Day: Intelligent Design on Trial", 2008

"Origins: How Life Began", 2004

"The Deadliest Plane Crash", 2006

"Galileo's Battle For The Heavens", 2002

"Cracking the Code of Life"

"Building Big"

"Surviving AIDS", 2000 (AAAS Westinghouse Journalism Award)

"Siamese Twins", 1995

"Iceman", 1993

"Machine that Changed the World", 1992

"Miracle of Life", 1983

== Personal life ==
Apsell's husband is Sheldon Apsell Ph.D., a physicist, executive of MicroLogic, Inc and a founder of Kronos. They have two daughters.

== See also ==
- Nova (American TV series)
- Nova ScienceNow

== Addition sources ==
- U.S. Public Records Index, Provo, UT
- Boston Globe, Nov 25, 1985., pg. 37
- Boston Globe, Nov 4, 1994., pg. 35
- Brandeis Review
- Brandeis Alumni Society
