= Esther Safran Foer =

American writer

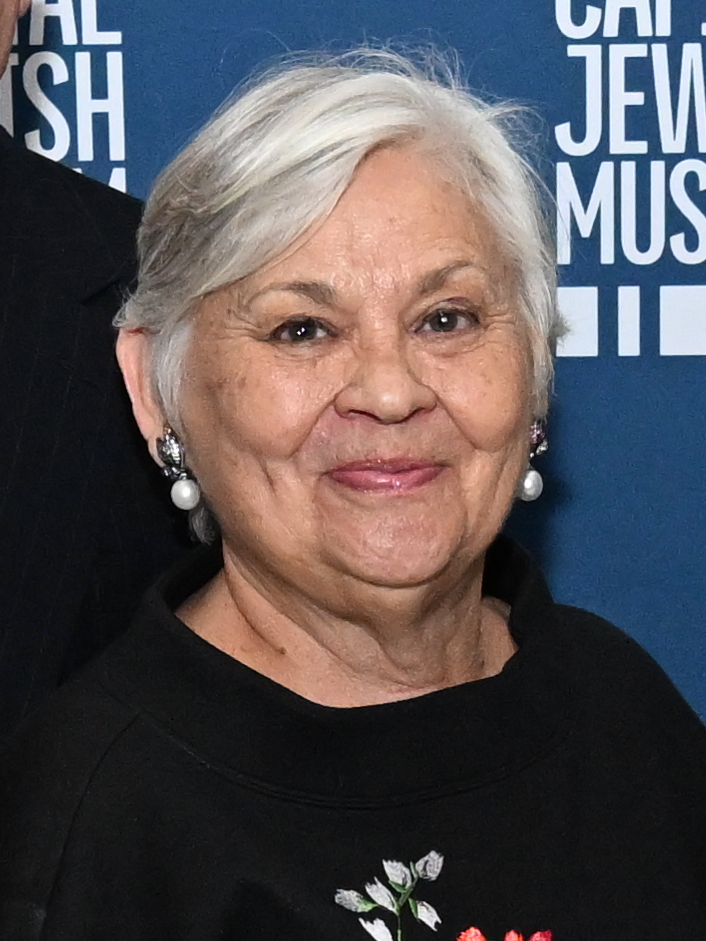
- Foer in 2025
- Born: Esther Safran; 1946 (age 79–80); Łódź, Polish People's Republic (now Poland)
- Spouse: Bert Foer
- Children: Jonathan, Franklin, and Joshua

Esther Safran Foer (born 1946) is a writer and the former executive director of Sixth & I Synagogue in Washington, DC.

== Early life ==
Esther Safran was born in Łódź, Poland to Louis and Ethel Safran, Holocaust survivors who met in 1945. She spent her early childhood in a displaced persons camp before moving with her family to the United States in 1949. The family later settled in Washington, DC. Esther's father died by suicide in 1954.

== Family ==
Safran Foer is married to Bert Foer, a lawyer and president of the American Antitrust Institute. They have three sons; novelist Jonathan Safran Foer, and journalists Franklin and Joshua Foer.

== Career ==
Foer worked as press secretary for presidential candidate George McGovern. She founded public-relations firm FM Strategic Communications in 2002 and served as executive director of Sixth & I Synagogue from 2007 to 2016.

In 2008, The Forward recognized Foer as one of its Forward 50. Washingtonian included Foer in their 2015 list of The Most Powerful Women in Washington.

In 2020, Foer published her memoir I Want You To Know We’re Still Here . In it she describes how she discovered and explored the existence of her father's first wife and daughter, who were murdered in the Holocaust.
