= Nova ScienceNow =

- Presented by: Robert Krulwich (2005–2006); Neil deGrasse Tyson (2006–2011); David Pogue (2012)
- Theme music composer: Rob Morsberger
- Country of origin: United States
- Original language: English
- No. of seasons: 6
- No. of episodes: 36

Production
- Executive producers: Paula S. Apsell; Samuel Fine
- Running time: 55 minutes
- Production company: WGBH

Original release
- Network: PBS
- Release: January 25, 2005 – November 14, 2012

Nova ScienceNow (styled NOVΛ scienceNOW) was a spinoff of the PBS science program Nova that ran from 2005 to 2012.

The series premiered on January 25, 2005, and was originally hosted by Robert Krulwich, who described it as an experiment in coverage of "breaking science, science that's right out of the lab, science that sometimes bumps up against politics, art, culture". At the beginning of season two, Neil deGrasse Tyson replaced Krulwich as the show's host. Tyson announced he would leave the show and was replaced by David Pogue in season 6.

The show was intended to return with more new episodes in 2015.

== Cast ==
Host Robert Krulwich left the program at the end of the first season. He was replaced by astrophysicist Dr. Neil deGrasse Tyson, director of the Hayden Planetarium. In addition to the host, several correspondents report on many of the individual stories including Peter Standring, Chad Cohen, Ziya Tong, Carla Wohl, Rebecca Skloot, and David Duncan. David Pogue is the host of the show's sixth season.

== Episodes ==
=== Series overview ===
Season	Episodes	Originally released	
Season	Episodes	First released	Last released
1	5	January 25, 2005	January 10, 2006
2	5	October 9, 2006	July 24, 2007
3	6	June 25, 2008	July 30, 2008
4	8	June 30, 2009	September 1, 2009
5	6	January 19, 2011	February 23, 2011
6	6	October 10, 2012	November 14, 2012

=== Season 1 (2005–06) ===
No. overall	No. in season	Title	Original release date	Prod. code
1	1	"Mirror Neurons, Hurricanes, Profile: James McLurkin, Booming Sands, Kinetic Sculptor and Conundrum"	January 25, 2005	3204
2	2	"Little People of Flores, T. rex, Profile: Naomi Halas, Stem Cells and Frozen Frogs"	April 19, 2005	3209
3	3	"Fuel cells, RNAi, Fastest Glacier and Profile: Brothers Chudnovsky"	July 26, 2005	3210
4	4	"Artificial Life, Lightning, Profile: Erich Jarvis, Fish Surgery, Don't Ask the Expert: Neil deGrasse Tyson and Hurricane Katrina"	October 18, 2005	3214
5	5	"10th Planet, Twin Prime Conjecture, Ivory-Billed Woodpecker, Pandemic Flu, Lab Meat?, Stem Cells Update, Stronger Hurricanes and Profile: Tyler Curiel"	January 10, 2006	3302

=== Season 2 (2006–07) ===
No. overall	No. in season	Title	Original release date	Prod. code
6	1	"Asteroid, Island of Stability, Obesity and Profile: Karl Iagnemma"	October 3, 2006	3313
7	2	"1918 Flu, Mass Extinction, Papyrus and Profile: Cynthia Breazeal"	November 21, 2006	3318
8	3	"Aging, Space Elevator, Maya and Profile: Bonnie Bassler"	January 9, 2007	3401
9	4	"Sleep, CERN, Emergence and Profile: Julie Schablitsky"	July 10, 2007	3410
10	5	"T. Rex Blood?, Epigenetics, Kryptos and Profile: Arlie Petters"	July 24, 2007	3411

=== Season 3 (2008) ===
No. overall	No. in season	Title	Original release date	Prod. code
11	1	"Dark Matter, Of Mice and Memory, Profile: Hany Farid and Wisdom of the Crowds"	June 25, 2008	301
12	2	"Personal DNA Testing, Art Authentication, Capturing Carbon and Profile: Pardis Sabeti"	July 2, 2008	302
13	3	"Saving Hubble, First Primates, Profile: Alfredo Quiñones-Hinojosa and Killer Microbe"	July 9, 2008	303
14	4	"Bird Brains, Space Storms, Profile: Yoky Matsuoka and Smart Bridges"	July 16, 2008	304
15	5	"Leeches, The Search for ET, Stem Cells Breakthrough and Profile: Edith Widder"	July 23, 2008	305
16	6	"Phoenix Mars Lander, Brain Trauma, Mammoth Mystery and Profile: Judah Folkman"	July 30, 2008	306

=== Season 4 (2009) ===
No. overall	No. in season	Title	Original release date	Prod. code
17	1	"Diamond Factory, Anthrax Investigation, Auto-Tune and Profile: Luis von Ahn"	June 30, 2009	401
18	2	"Hunt for Alien Earths, Art Authentication, Profile: Maydianne Andrade and Autism Genes"	July 7, 2009	402
19	3	"Marathon Mouse, Dinosaur Plague, Profile: Franklin Chang-Diaz and Space Storms"	July 14, 2009	403
20	4	"Picky Eaters, Capturing Carbon, Sea Lions and Walruses and Profile: Sangeeta Bhatia"	July 21, 2009	404
21	5	"Moon Smasher, Secrets in the Salt, Bird Brains and Profile: Lonnie Thompson"	July 28, 2009	405
22	6	"Public Genomes, Algae Fuel, Arctic Ocean Seafloor and Profile: Yoky Matsuoka"	August 18, 2009	406
23	7	"Saving Hubble Update, Gangster Birds, Profile: Alfredo Quiñones-Hinojosa and How Memory Works"	August 25, 2009	407
24	8	"Sleep, First Primates, Earthquakes in the Midwest and Profile: Sang-Mook Lee"	September 1, 2009	408

=== Season 5 (2011) ===
No. overall	No. in season	Title	Original release date	Prod. code
25	1	"Can We Make It to Mars?"	January 19, 2011	501
26	2	"Can We Live Forever?"	January 26, 2011	502
27	3	"How Does the Brain Work?"	February 2, 2011	503
28	4	"How Smart Are Animals?"	February 9, 2011	504
29	5	"Where Did We Come From?"	February 16, 2011	505
30	6	"What's the Next Big Thing?"	February 23, 2011	506

=== Season 6 (2012) ===
No. overall	No. in season	Title	Original release date	Prod. code
31	1	"What Makes Us Human?"	October 10, 2012	601
32	2	"Can Science Stop Crime?"	October 17, 2012	602
33	3	"How Smart Can We Get? feat. USA Memory Champion Chester Santos"	October 24, 2012	603
34	4	"Can I Eat That?"	October 31, 2012	604
35	5	"What Are Animals Thinking?"	November 7, 2012	605
36	6	"What Will The Future Be Like?"	November 14, 2012	606

== Reception ==
NOVΛ scienceNOW has received generally positive reviews from television critics and parents of young children. New York Daily News wrote, "★★★★ Lightyears from the norm."
