= Sukkah =

Temporary hut during the Jewish festival of Sukkot

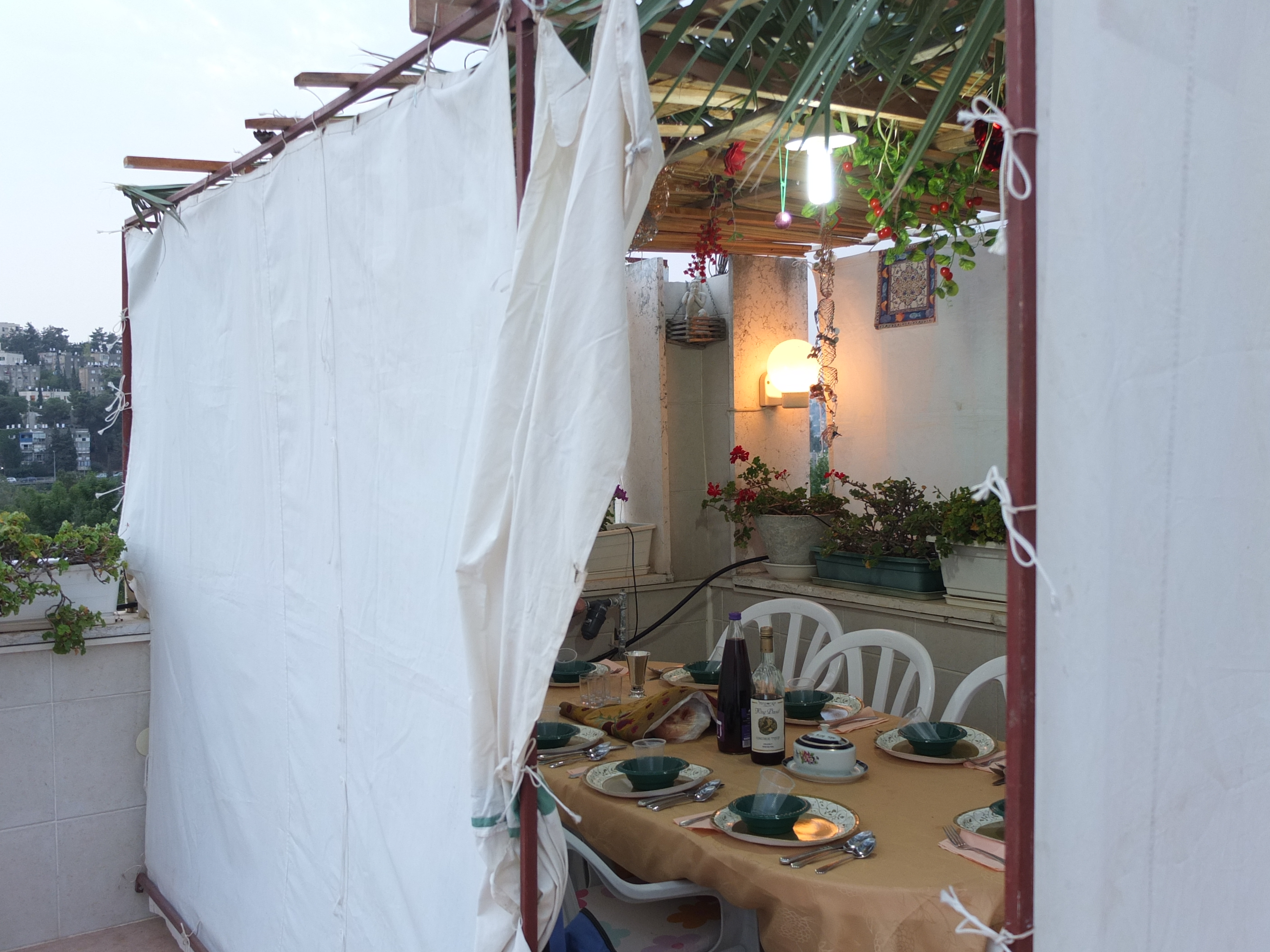
Canvas-sided sukkah on a roof, topped with palm branches and bamboo s'chach

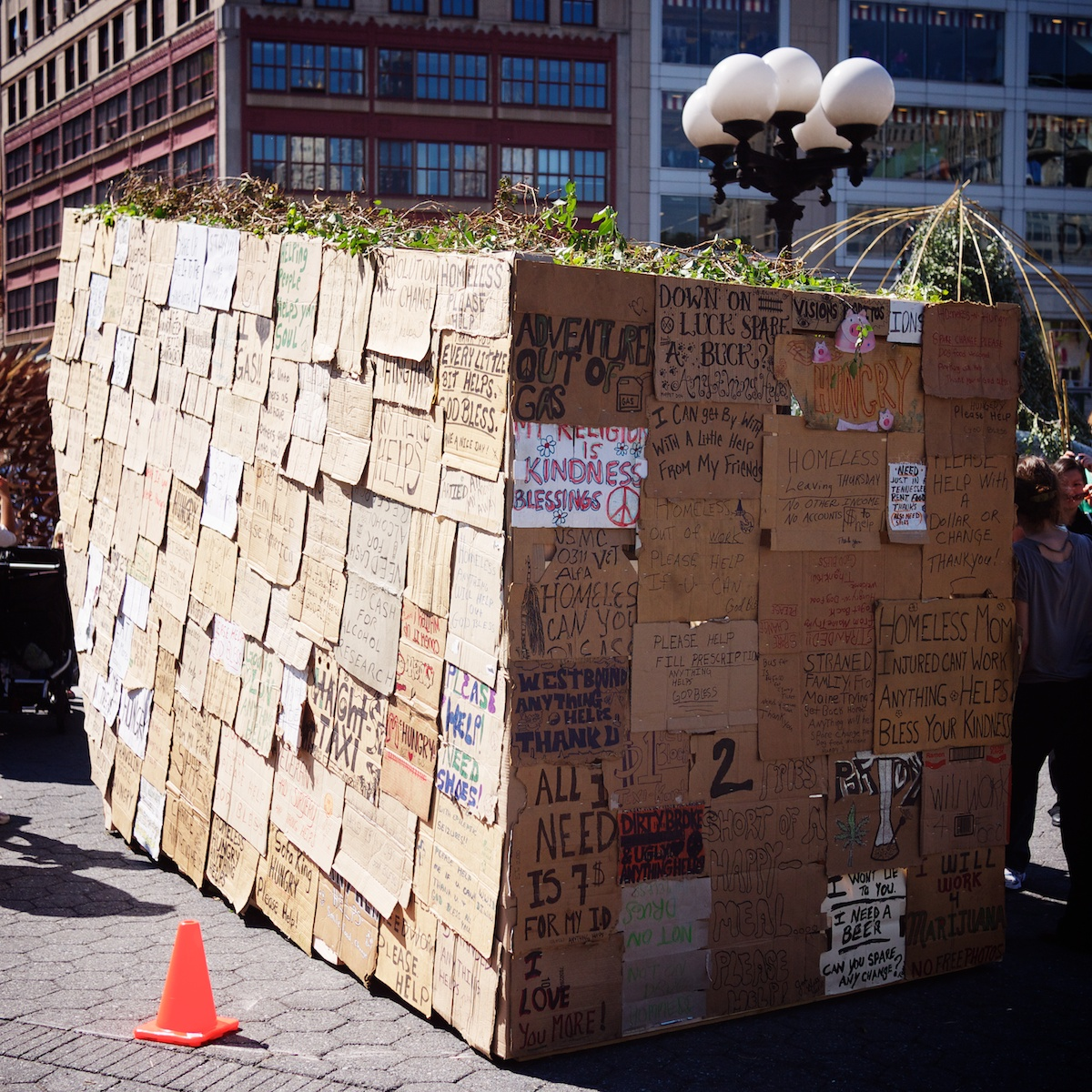
Sukkah with walls made of cardboard signs in Oakland, California

A sukkah or succah (/ˈsʊkə/; Hebrew: סוכה [suˈka]; plural, סוכות [suˈkot] sukkot or sukkos or sukkoth, often translated as "booth") is a temporary hut constructed for use during the week-long Jewish festival of Sukkot. It is topped with branches and often well decorated with autumnal, harvest or Judaic themes.

The book of Vayikra (Leviticus) describes it as a symbolic wilderness shelter, commemorating the time God provided for the Israelites in the wilderness they inhabited after they were freed from slavery in Egypt. It is common for Jews to eat, sleep and otherwise spend time in the sukkah. In Judaism, Sukkot is considered a joyous occasion and is referred to in Hebrew as Z'man Simchateinu (the time of our rejoicing), and the sukkah itself symbolizes the fragility and transience of life and one's dependence on God.

== Associated activities ==
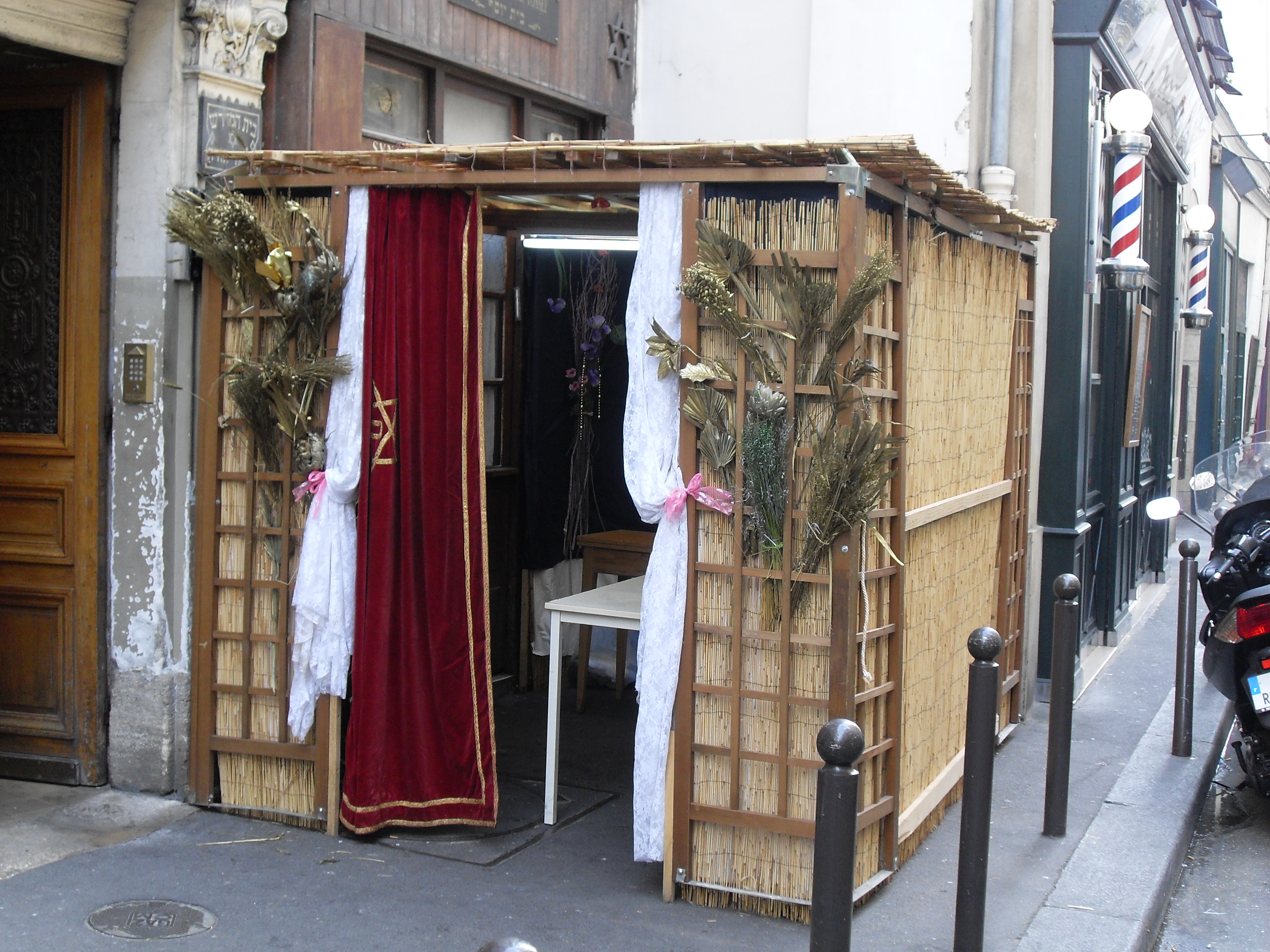
A street-side sukkah in Paris, France

The halakha requires eating and traditionally sleeping in the sukkah. However, Jews are not expected to remain in the sukkah if they would be very uncomfortable there. For this reason, Jews living at northern latitudes will generally not sleep in the sukkah due to the low temperatures of autumn nights. Some Jews in these locales will spend some time in the sukkah eating and relaxing but go indoors to sleep.

When rain falls on the sukkah, one is not required to stay inside. The Mishna in Sukkah 28b compares rain falling on a sukkah to a master who receives a drink from his servant and then throws it back in the servant's face. The analogy is that through the rainfall, God is showing displeasure with the performance of the mitzvah by not allowing the Jews to fulfill their obligation of sitting in the sukkah.

In Israel and other temperate climates (such as Florida, Australia, Texas, and Southern California), observant Jews will often conduct all their eating, studying, and sleeping activities in the sukkah. Many Jews will not eat or drink anything outside the sukkah. Others will drink or eat fruit outside the sukkah.

In Israel, it is a common practice for hotels, restaurants, snack shops, and outdoor tourist attractions (such as zoos) to provide a Kosher sukkah for customers to dine in.

All Lubavitcher Hasidim and some Belzer Hasidim (especially outside Israel) do not sleep in the sukkah due to its intrinsic holiness. Though the halakha does not obligate one to eat or sleep in the sukkah if it is raining, Lubavitcher Hasidim will still eat there.

A popular social activity which involves people visiting each other's Sukkot has become known as "Sukkah hopping". Food is laid out so that participants will be able to recite the various required blessings.

== Structure ==
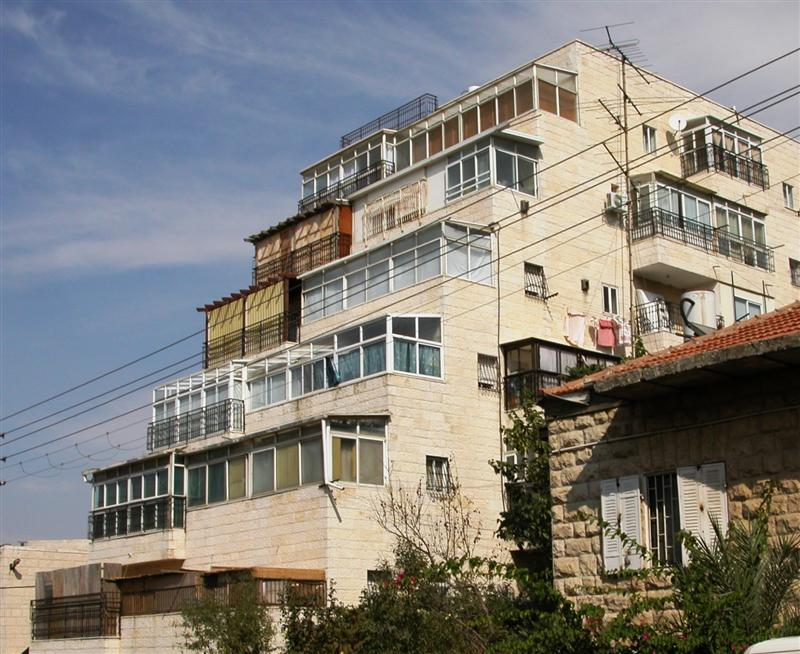
Sukkot on graded apartment balconies in Jerusalem

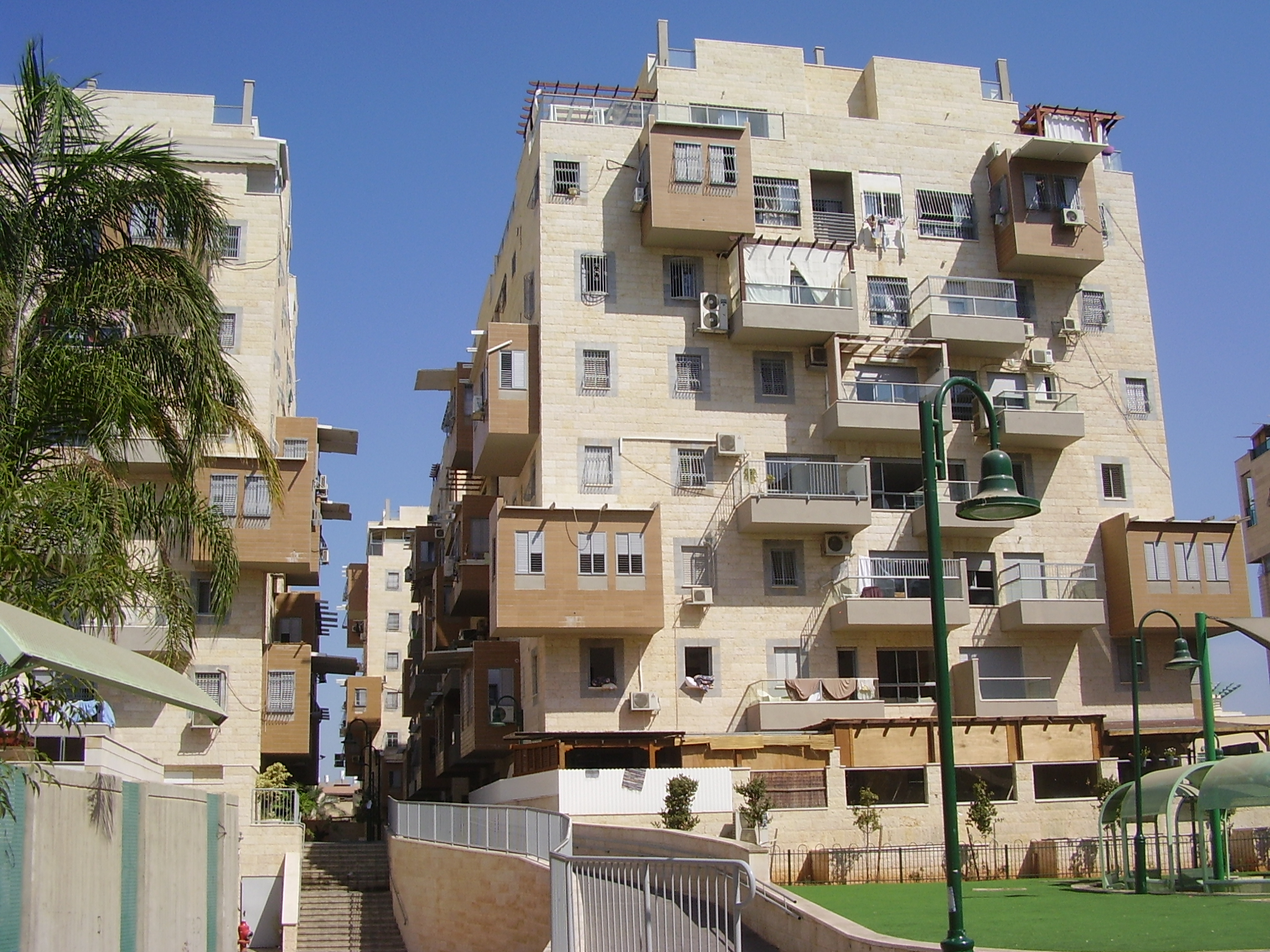
Porch sukkot in Bnei Brak

According to halakha, a sukkah is a structure consisting of a roof made of organic material which has been disconnected from the ground for the purpose of the commandment (the s'chach). A sukkah must have three walls. It should be at least three feet tall, and be positioned so that all or part of its roof is open to the sky. (Only the part which is under the sky is kosher.) Most authorities require its floor area to be at least 16 square cubits.

In practice, the walls of a sukkah can be constructed from any material that will withstand a normally anticipated terrestrial wind. If the material is not rigid and therefore will sway in the wind, the sukkah is not kosher (Talmud, Sukkah 24b). Accordingly, there is a discussion among contemporary halakhic authorities whether canvas may be used for walls: Some, such as R. Ovadiah Yosef (Shu"t Yechaveh Da'at 3:46) hold that even the slightest degree of swaying in the wind will disqualify the sukkah walls, and thus canvas cannot realistically be employed. Others, such as the Chazon Ish, permit motion to and fro of less than three handbreadths, thereby facilitating the usage of canvas walls which are anchored at all sides. The specific details of what constitutes a wall, the minimum and maximum wall heights, whether there can be spaces between the walls and the roof, and the exact material required for the s'chach (roofing) can be found in various exegetical texts.

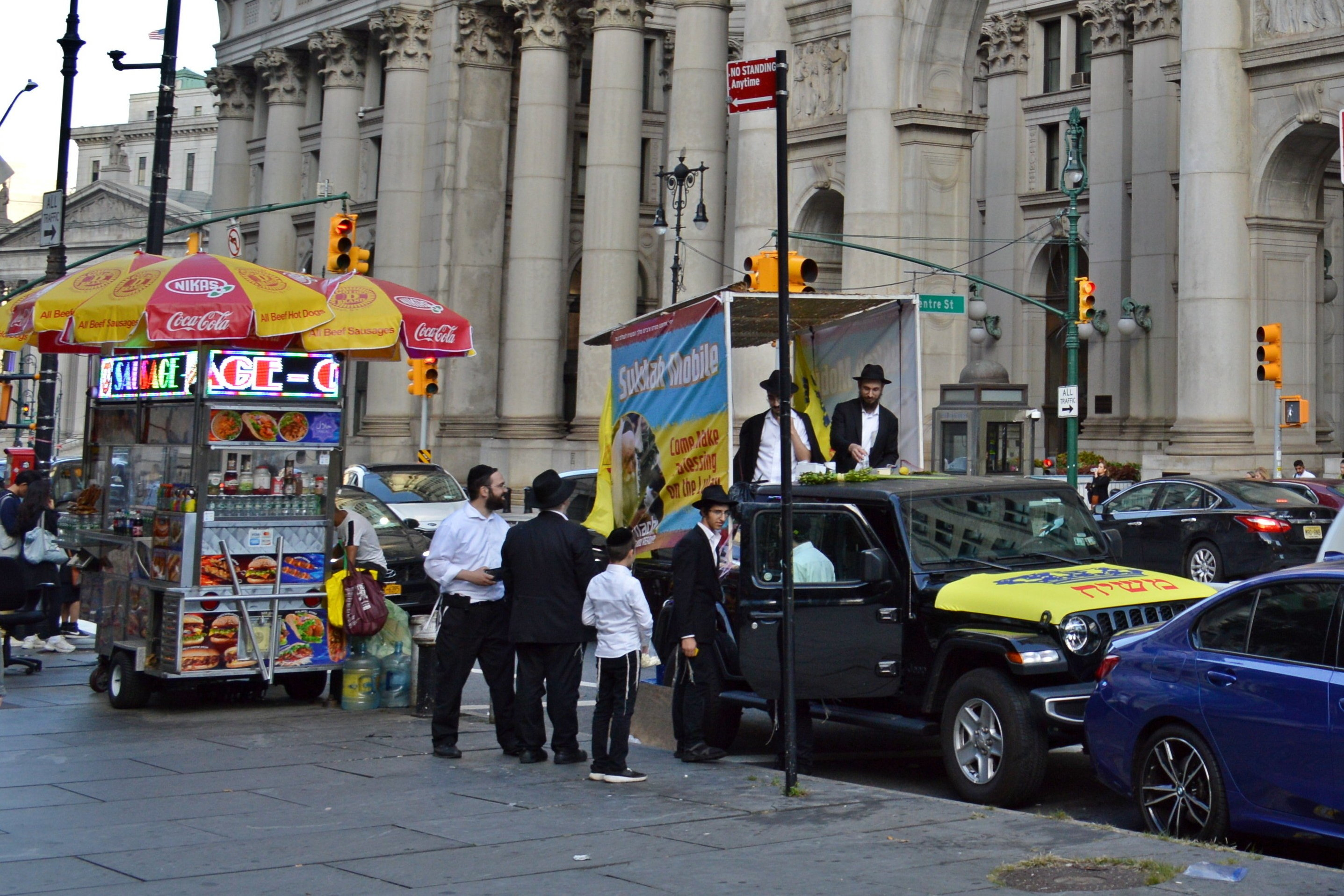
Sukkah Mobile in Manhattan, New York

A sukkah can be built on the ground or on an open porch or balcony. Indeed, many observant Jews who design their home's porch or deck will do so in a fashion that aligns with their sukkah-building needs. Portable sukkot made of a collapsible metal frame and cloth walls have recently become available for those who have little space, or for those who are traveling (in order to have a place to eat one's meals).

=== Roof covering ===
The roof covering, known as s'chach (Hebrew: סכך), must consist of something that grew from the earth but is currently disconnected from it. Palm leaves, bamboo sticks, pine branches, wood and the like can all be used for s'chach, unless they were processed previously for a different use.

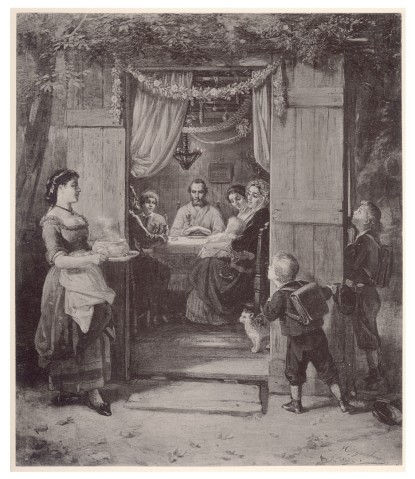
Jewish family in a sukkah

There must be enough s'chach that inside the sukkah there should be more shade than sun. However, there should ideally be sufficient gaps between the pieces of s'chach so that one can see the sun or stars.

=== Decorations ===
Many people hang decorations such as streamers, shiny ornaments, and pictures from the interior walls and ceiling beams of a sukkah. Fresh, dried or plastic fruit—including etrogs and the seven species for which Israel is praised (wheat, barley, grapes, figs, pomegranates, olives and dates; see Deuteronomy 8:8)—are popular decorations.

Some families also line the interior walls with white sheeting, in order to recall the "Clouds of Glory" that surrounded the Jewish nation during their wanderings in the desert. The Chabad custom is not to decorate the sukkah, as the sukkah itself is considered to be an object of beauty.

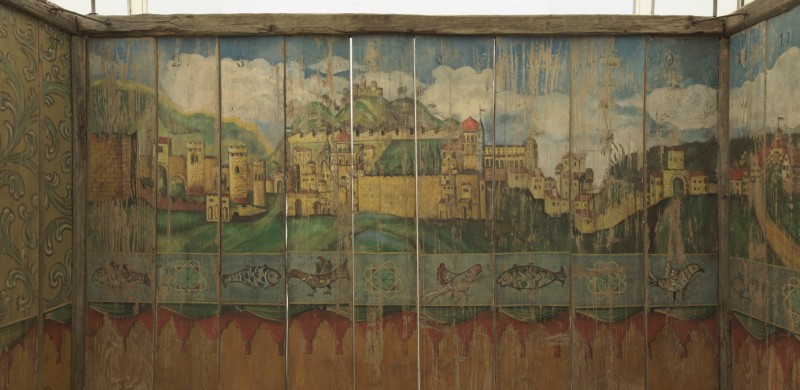
19th century sukkah from Austria with a painting of Jerusalem - Musée d'Art et d'Histoire du Judaïsme

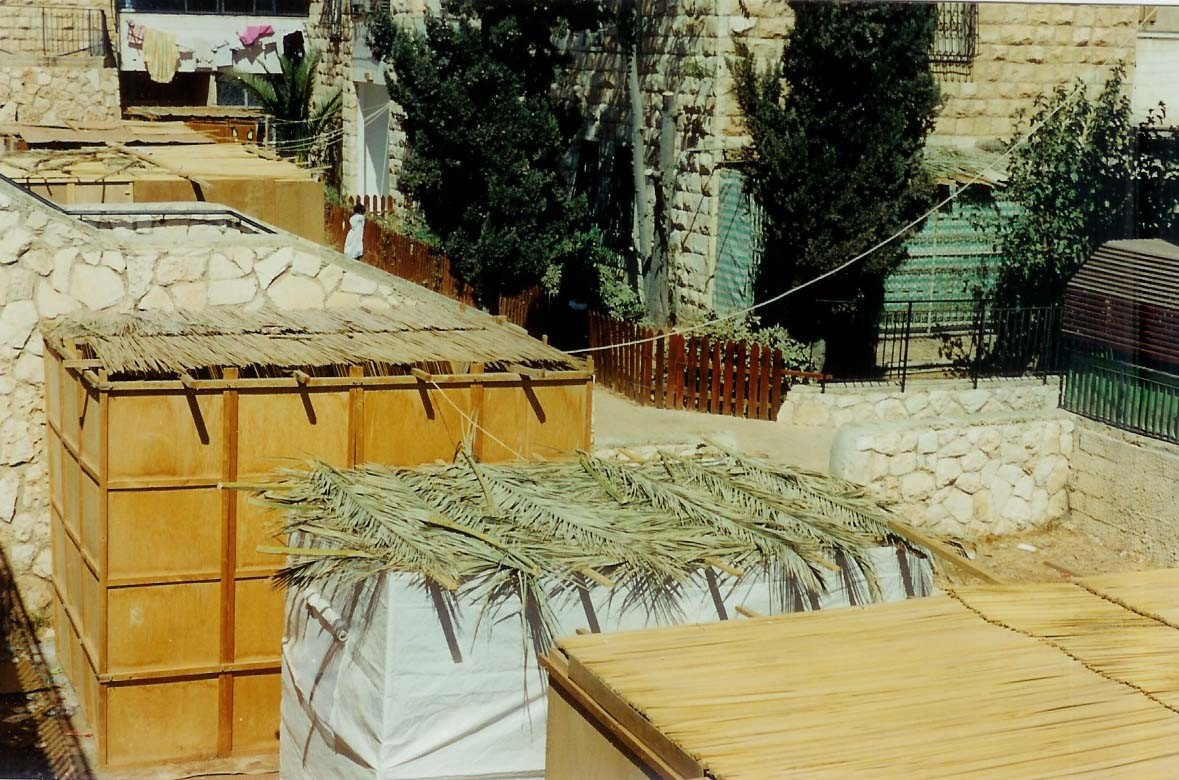
Different types of kosher s'chach serve as roofs for sukkot: woven bamboo mats (far left and right); palm leaves (center).

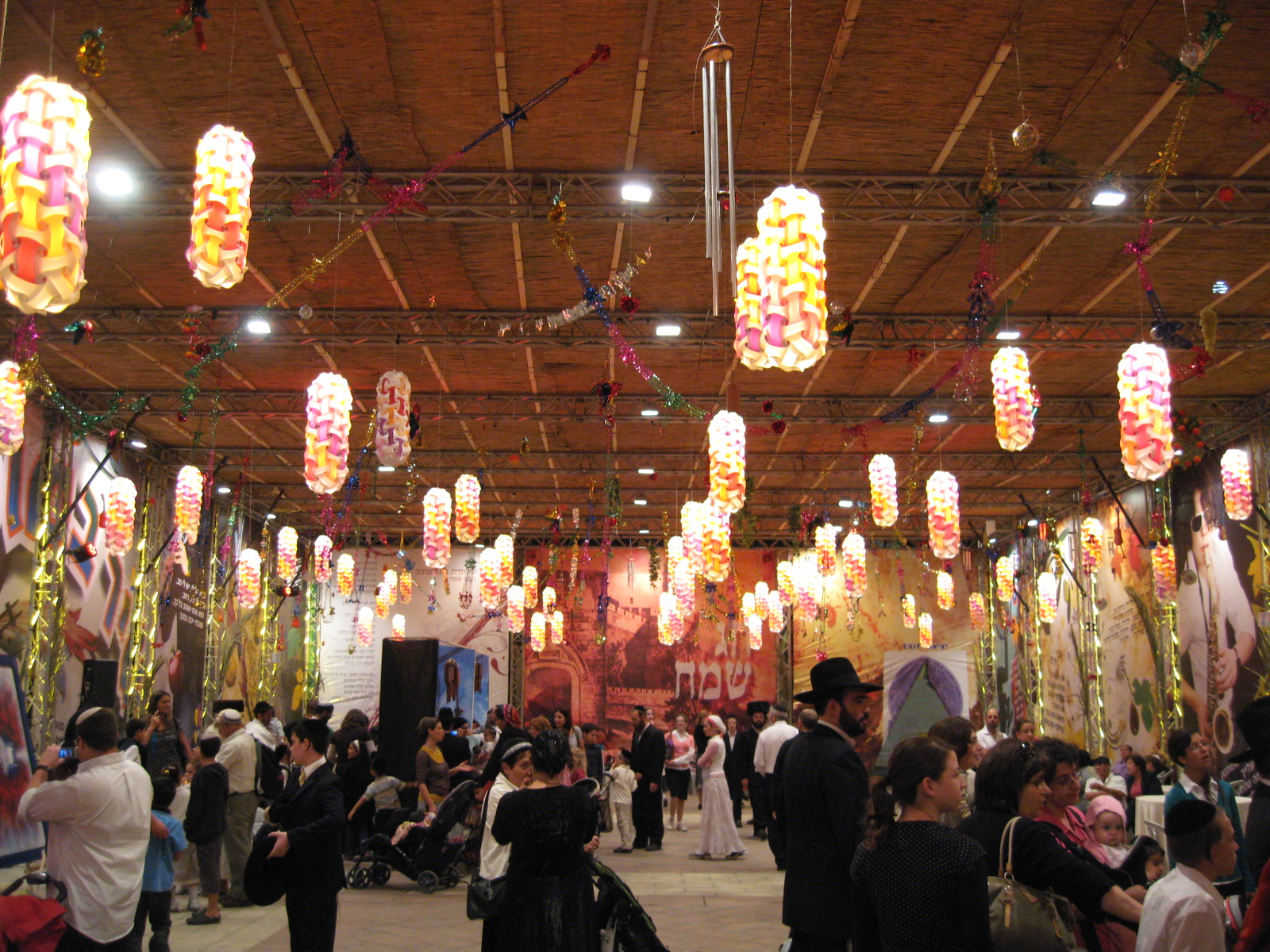
Safra Square Sukkah, Jerusalem, 2009

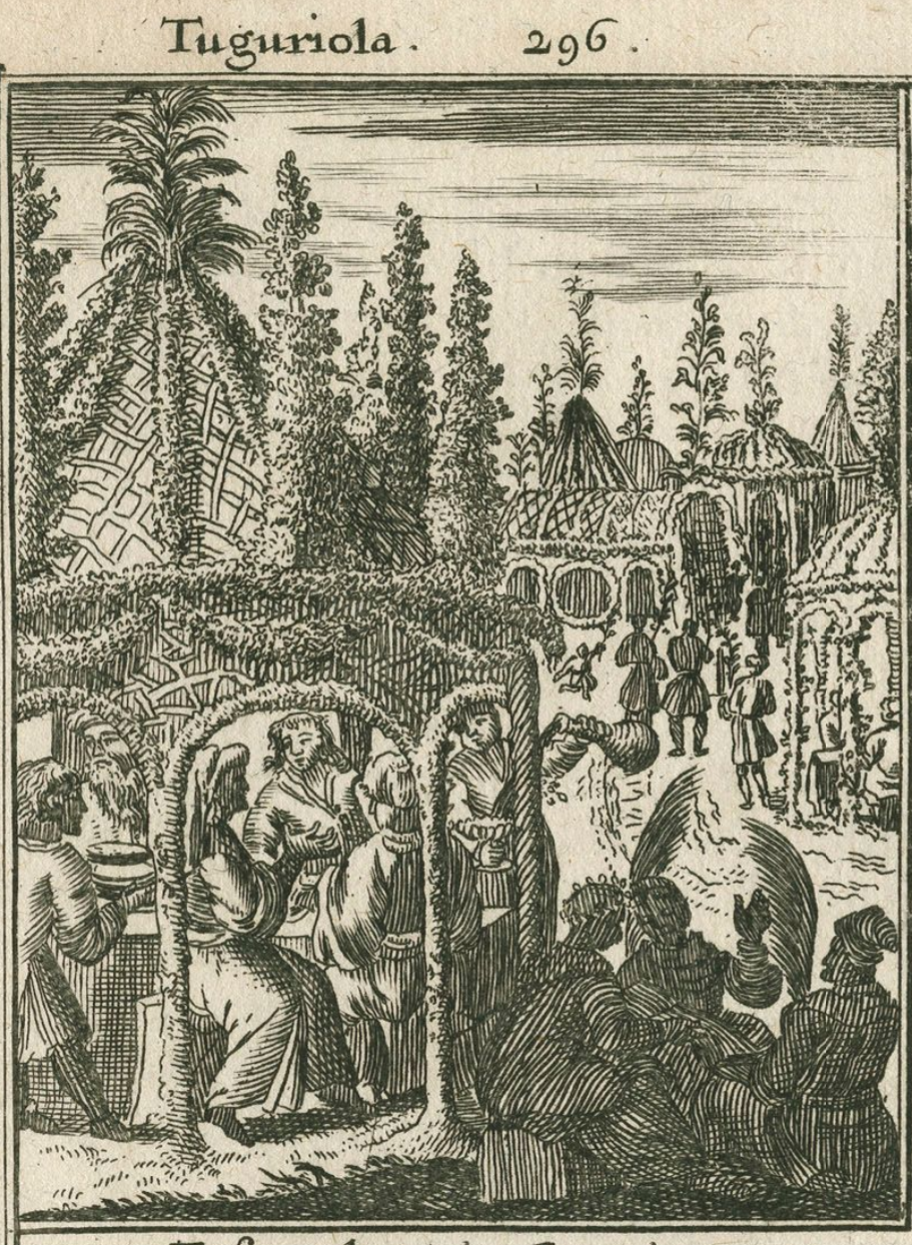
1657 engraving

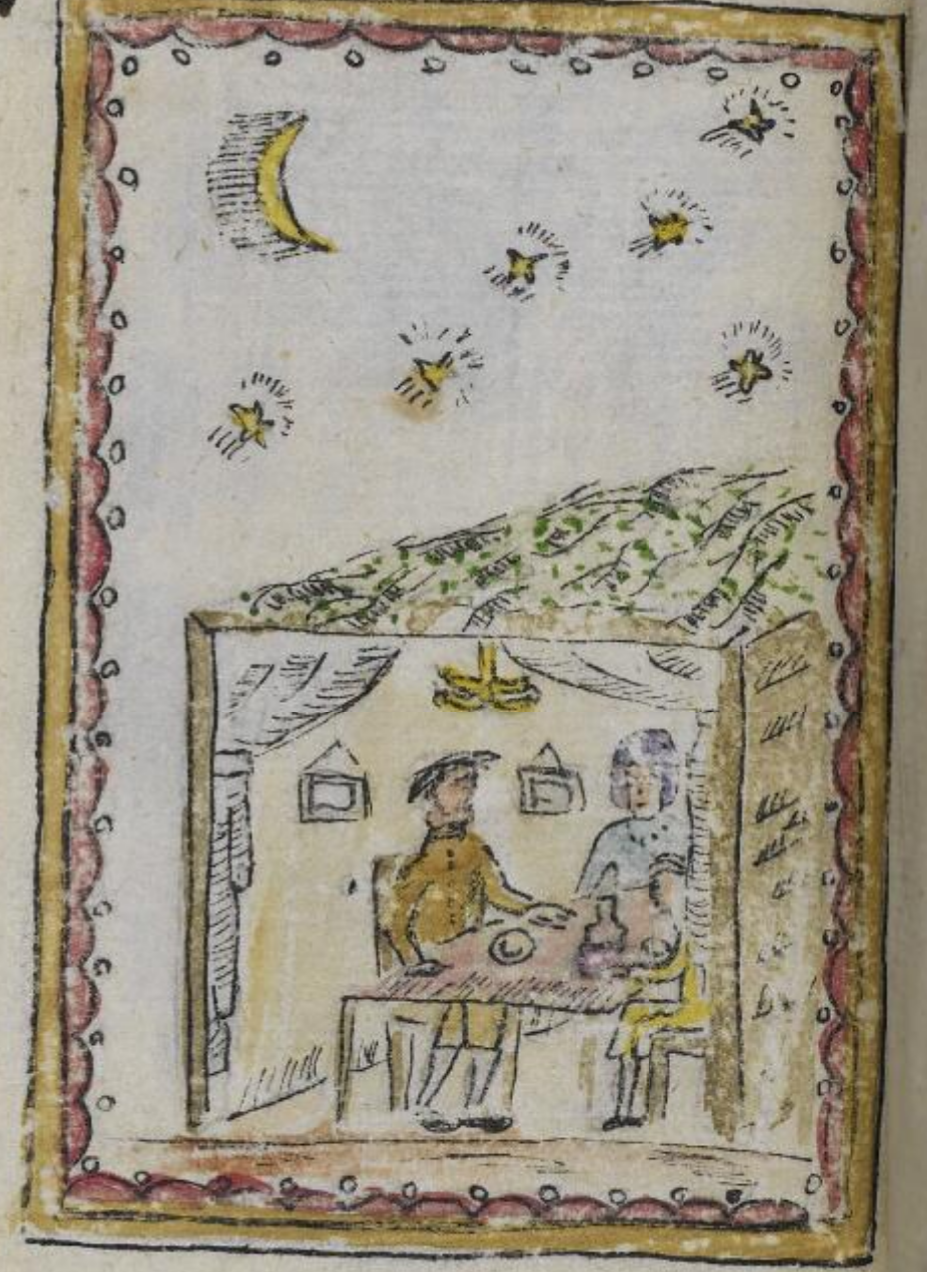
1740 illumination.

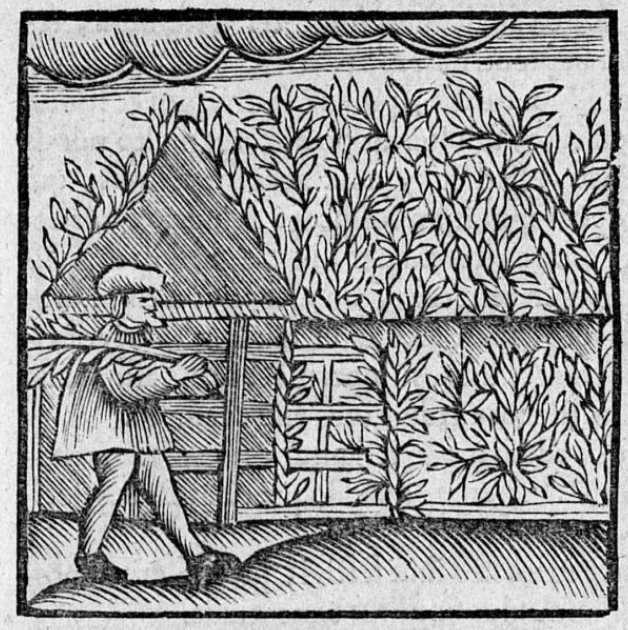
1699 engraving

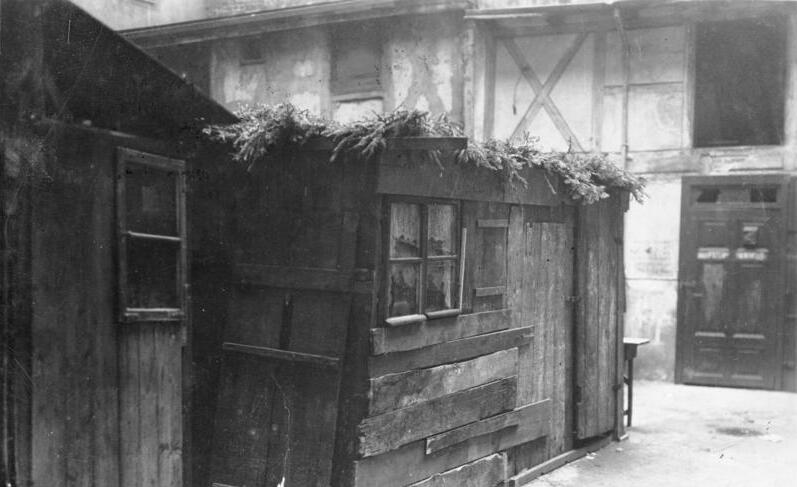
"Scheunenviertel", Berlin, 1933

== Associated prayers ==
=== Blessing ===
According to Jewish law, one must recite the following blessing when using the sukkah. The blessing is normally recited after the blessing made on food, such as on bread or cake:

Hebrew	Transliteration	English
ברוך אתה ה' א‑לוהינו, מלך העולם, אשר קדשנו במצותיו וצונו לישב בסכה.	Barukh ata Adonai E-loheinu, melekh ha'olam, asher kid'shanu b'mitzvotav v'tzivanu leishev ba'sukah.	Blessed are You, LORD our God, King of the universe, Who has sanctified us with His commandments and commanded us to dwell in the sukkah.

=== Ushpizin ===
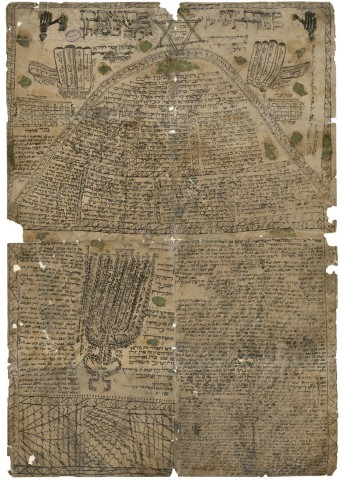
A Sukkot Prayer- Seder Ushpizin

During the holiday, some Jews recite the ushpizin prayer which symbolizes the welcoming of seven "exalted guests" into the sukkah. These ushpizin, or guests, represent the seven shepherds of Israel: Abraham, Isaac, Jacob, Moses, Aaron, Joseph and David. According to tradition, each night a different guest is invited into the sukkah followed by the other six. Each of the ushpizin parallels the spiritual focus of the day on which they visit.

In Chabad tradition, an additional set of corresponding "chasidic" ushpizin enter the sukkah, beginning with the Baal Shem Tov and the Maggid of Mezeritch and continuing with the consecutive rebbes of the Chabad Hasidic dynasty.

== Notable examples ==
=== Drive-through ===
In 2010, Bet Shira Congregation in Miami, Florida, erected a tent as a drive-through Sukkah, dubbed "McBet Shira Sukkah", in the parking lot of the synagogue.

=== Sukkah City ===
Sukkah City was a public art and architecture competition planned for New York City's Union Square Park. The winning design was chosen as the City Sukkah, to stand, starting on September 22, 2010, for the requisite seven days of the harvest holiday. A committee of art critics and celebrated architects selected the 12 finalists from a field of entries.

=== Pedi-Sukkah ===
Pedi-Sukkahs see the normally stationary build of a Sukkah placed on the back of a mobile vehicle, usually a 3-wheeled bicycle. The pedi-Sukkah was introduced by Levi Duchman in 2009 and has since spread to at least 15 states and 5 countries.

== Samaritan sukkahs ==
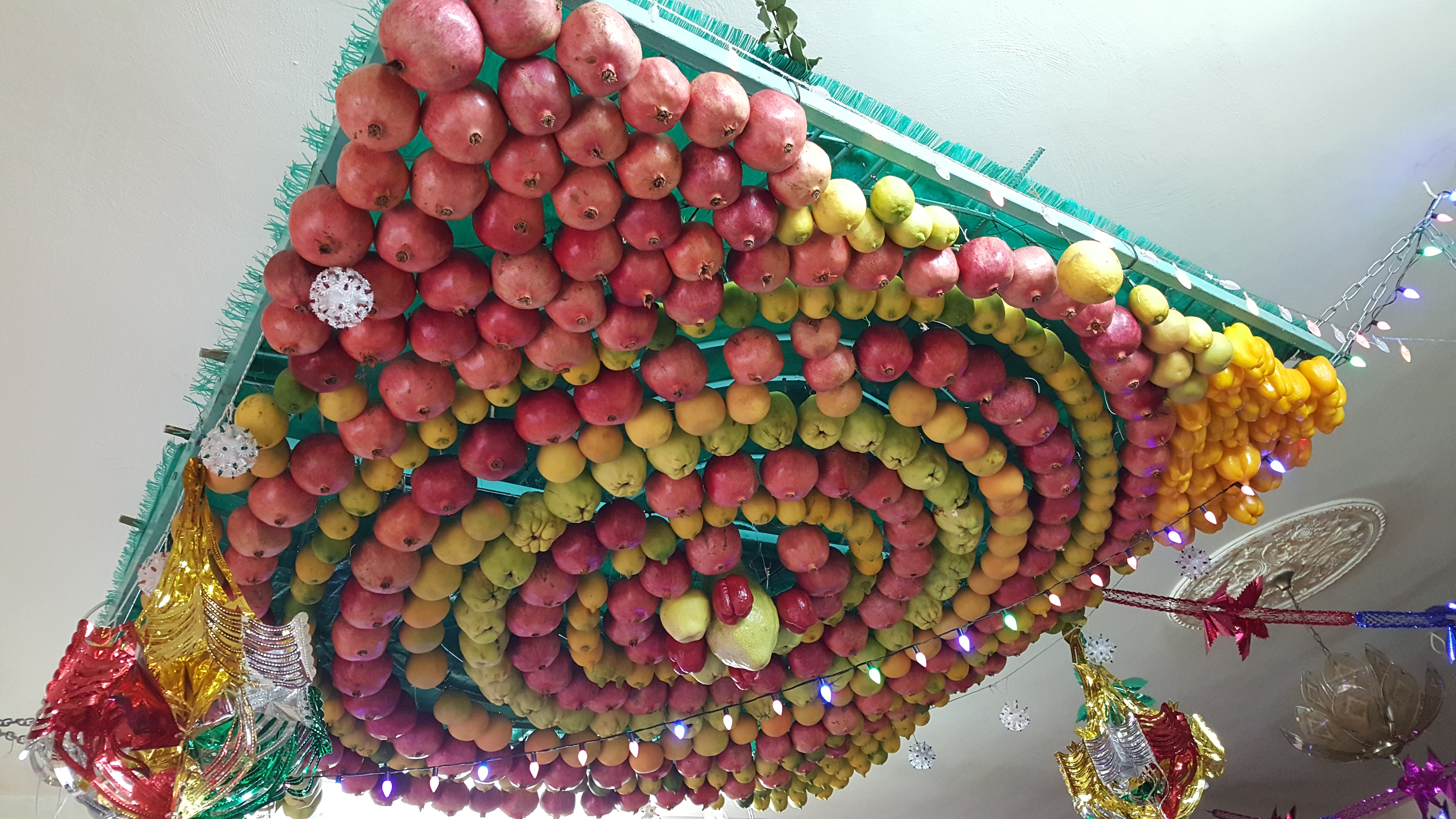
A Samaritan sukkah at Kiryat Luza, Mount Gerizim

In Samaritanism, sukkahs are built indoors using fruit instead of wood. According to Samaritan historian Benyamim Tsedaka, Samaritans initially constructed sukkahs outside of their homes, as Jews do. However, during the Byzantine period, the Samaritans faced persecutions and began to construct them inside instead. This custom has remained ever since.

== See also ==
- Four species
  - Etrog, citron
  - Lulav, palm frond
  - Hadass, myrtle branch
  - Aravah (Sukkot), willow branch
- Syndicat Northcrest v. Amselem, a Canadian legal case on the building of sukkot
