= Ed Cooke (author) =

British writer (born 1982)

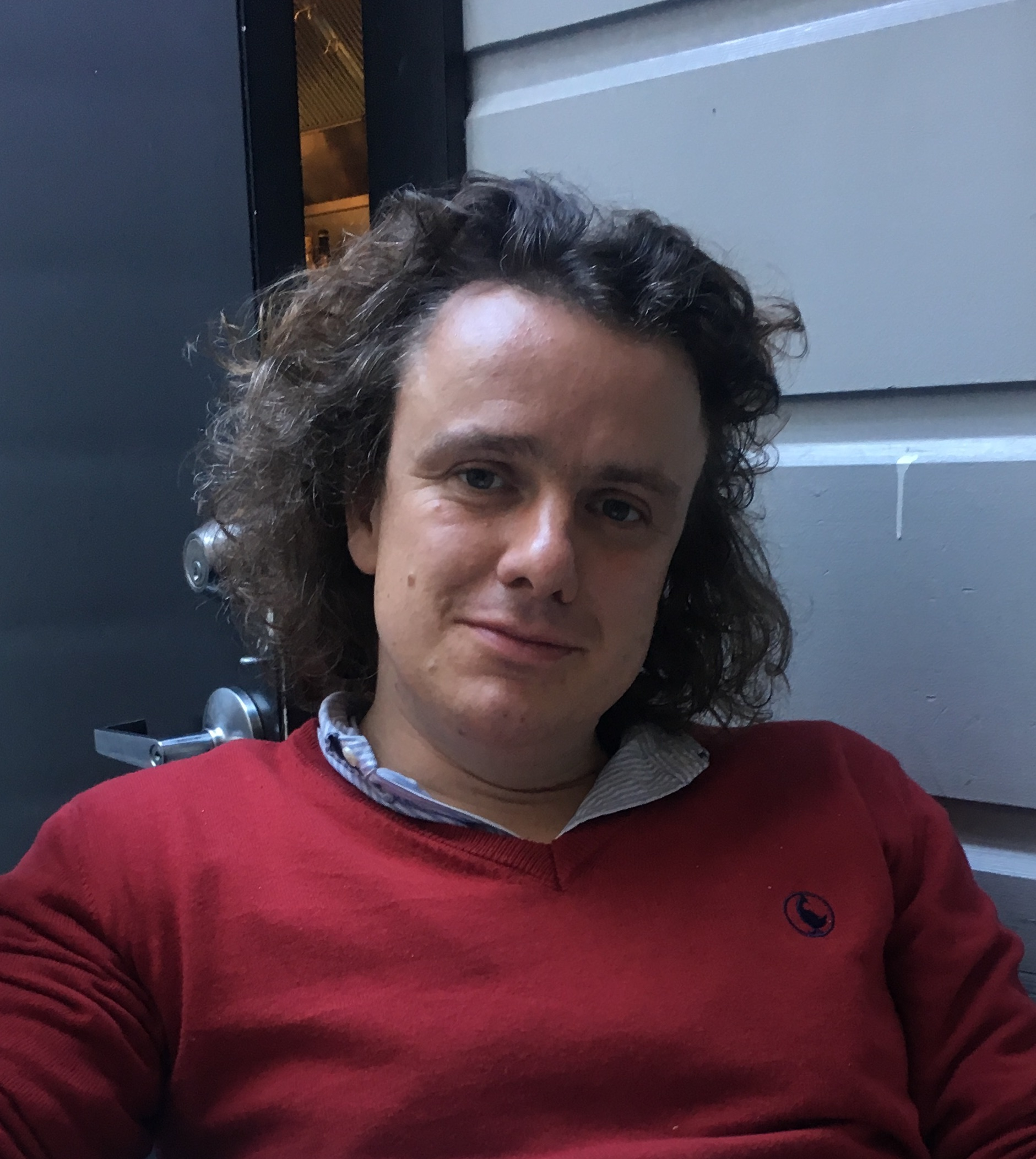
Ed Cooke in 2016

Edward "Ed" Cooke (born 1982) is a British entrepreneur and author of Remember, Remember: Learn the Stuff You Thought You Never Could. He is also a Grand Master of Memory and the co-founder of Memrise, a freemium online educational platform that uses memory techniques to optimise learning. He grew up in Oxfordshire.

== Career ==
After graduating with a first class degree in psychology and philosophy from Oxford University in 2004 and completing a master's degree in Cognitive Science at Paris Descartes University under the supervision of J. Kevin O'Regan in 2005, he started a career researching, writing about, and teaching memory techniques.

At 23, he became a Grand Master of Memory. Cooke uses memory techniques popularized by the likes of Tony Buzan and Dominic O'Brien, which involves turning raw data - packs of cards, series of numbers, US Presidents - into colourful imagery. His work has found popular application in education. To learn the electromagnetic spectrum, for instance, Cooke proposes transforming each stage (for example, the microwave) into an image (a microwave in the kitchen). He also features prominently in Joshua Foer's Moonwalking with Einstein, having acted as memory coach to Foer, who went on to become U.S. Memory Champion.

He is co-founder of Memrise, an online educational platform that uses memory techniques to optimise learning.

Cooke's latest writings on memory, education and philosophy can be found on his blog and on Twitter.

In May 2015, Cooke appeared in a BBC iWonder guide, Never forget: Can anyone improve a poor memory? presented by Alex Jones. He demonstrates the 'memory palace' technique in order to remember 18 random numbers in one minute.

During 2020's worldwide COVID-19 pandemic lockdown, Cooke and a group of collaborators co-founded The Co-Reality Collective to throw experimental online parties every two to three weeks. These drew hundreds of attendees, and spawned a new web-video platform called Sparkleverse, which was then selected as a host for 2020's online Burning Man.

In 2021, Cooke appeared on Channel 4 TV show Can I Improve my Memory as a memory coach.

In 2021, Ed initiated Sonic Sphere - a multi-sensory spherical concert hall inspired by Karlheinz Stockhausen's Kugelauditorium.

== Achievements in Memory Sports Contests ==
- 2003–10th at the World Memory Championships
- 2004–3rd at the Austrian Open Memory Championship
- 2004–11th at the World Memory Championships
- 2005–11th at the World Memory Championships
- 2006–8th at the World Memory Championships
- 2007–Champion at the Cambridge Memory Championship
- 2007–7th at the World Memory Championships
- 2008–10th at the World Memory Championships

== Bibliography ==
- Remember, remember: learn the stuff you thought you never could. London: Viking, 2008, ISBN 978-0-670-91785-3
