= American Antitrust Institute =

U.S. nonprofit organization

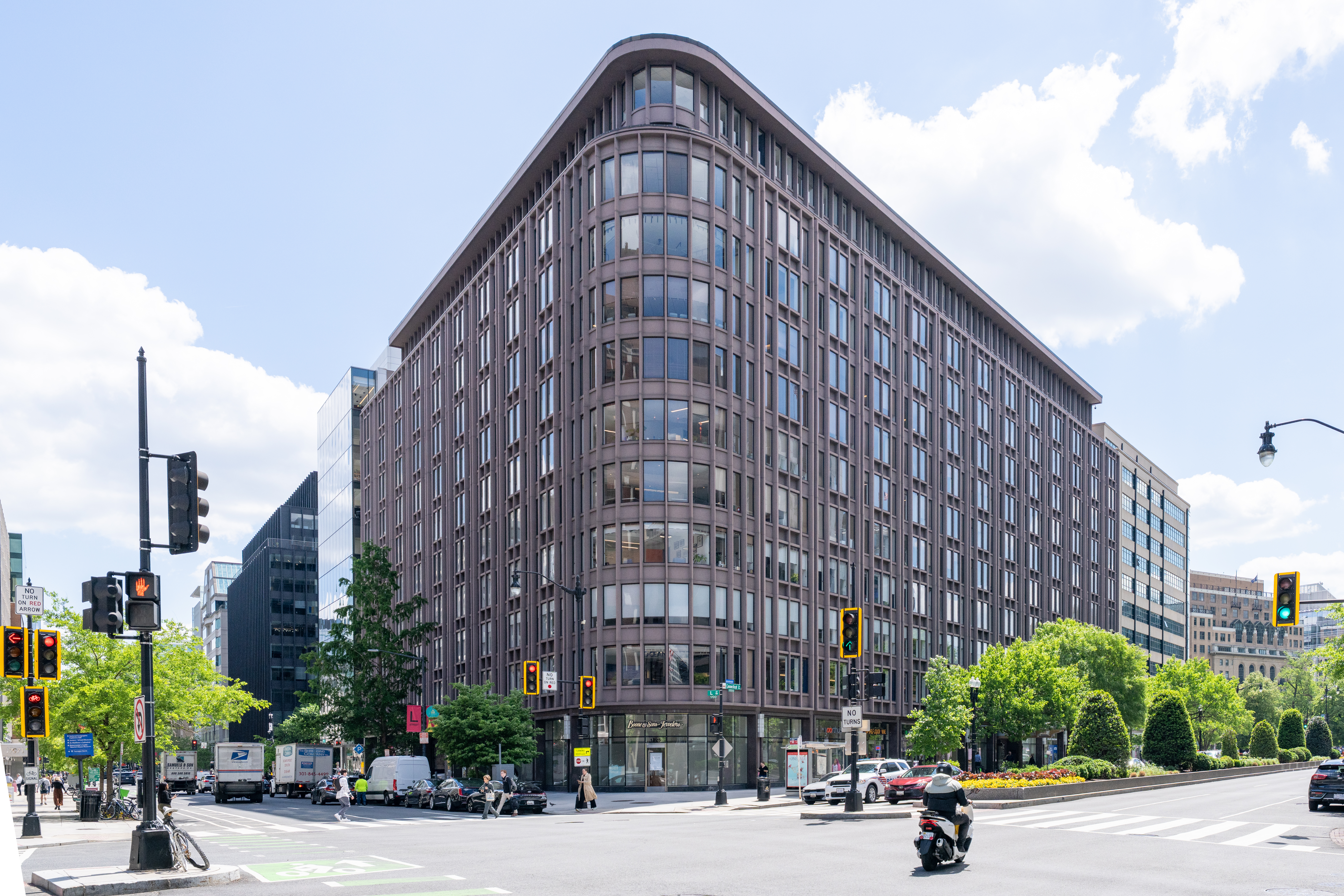
- Headquarters in Washington, D.C.
- Formation: 1998
- Founder: Albert Foer, Robert Lande, and Jonathan Cuneo
- Founded at: Washington, D.C.
- Purpose: think-tank
- Headquarters: 1025 Connecticut Avenue, NW
- Location: Washington, D.C.
- Region served: USA
- Official language: English
- President: Randy Stutz
- Vice President and Director of Legal Advocacy: Kathleen Bradish
- Senior Counsel: David O. Fisher
- Key people: Albert Foer
- Website: www.antitrustinstitute.org

The American Antitrust Institute (AAI) is a Washington, D.C.–based non-profit education, research, and advocacy organization. The AAI advocates for more aggressive antitrust enforcement by the federal government.

== History and funding ==
Founded in April 1998, AAI is a 501(c)(3) tax-exempt Washington, D.C., corporation. The AAI is funded through contributions from a wide variety of law firms, economics consulting firms, corporations, trade associations, and individuals, with substantial support from cy-près grants approved by courts in antitrust cases. According to The New York Times, the organization "has received funding from some tech companies."

== Activities ==
The AAI is known for calling on the federal government to investigate or block mergers that the Institute deems as anticompetitive and harmful to consumers. The AAI's policy approach has been described as one that "favors strong enforcement of the traditional approach to antitrust", in contrast to tendencies such as the New Brandeis movement.

In 2016, the AAI presented an updated statement of its position to the Trump administration titled AAI Transition Report to the 45th President of the United States.

== Leadership ==
The President of AAI is Randy Stutz. Kathleen Bradish serves as Vice President and Director of Legal Advocacy. In addition, AAI is served by David O. Fisher as Senior Counsel. Governance rests in a nine-person Board of Directors. The AAI has more than 100 individual members of an Advisory Board including many international advisors.
