= Aaron Gross =

American historian of religions

Aaron S. Gross

Academic background
- Education: Grinnell College, Harvard Divinity School, University of California, Santa Barbara
- Website: https://www.sandiego.edu/directory/biography.php?profile_id=330

Aaron S. Gross is an American historian of religions who focuses on modern Jewish ethics, the study of animals and religion, and food and religion. He serves as a professor of theology and religious studies at the University of San Diego. He has served as cochair of the American Academy of Religion's Animals and Religion group and as president of the Society of Jewish Ethics. Aaron Gross is a vegan.

== Education ==
Gross received his BA in Philosophy from Grinnell College, his M.T.S from Harvard Divinity School, and his Ph.D. from the University of California, Santa Barbara Department of Religious Studies.

== Farm Forward ==
In 2006, Gross founded Farm Forward, a nonprofit organization that has promoted alternative models of poultry production. Author Jonathan Safran Foer described Gross as “a visionary - his founding of Farm Forward will be looked at by future generations as a turning point in the fight to end factory farming.” Gross has been particularly active in efforts to improve kosher slaughter. According to animal welfare expert Temple Grandin, “Gross has played a critical role in improving kosher slaughter . . . his knowledge about both the Jewish and animal communities is invaluable.”

== Written works ==
He collaborated closely with Jonathan Safran Foer on Foer's international bestseller, Eating Animals, and is featured in the book. Writing in the New Yorker, Elizabeth Kolbert described Gross as one of the heroes of Eating Animals along with Franz Kafka and Jacques Derrida.

Gross is the author of The Question of the Animal and Religion: Theoretical Stakes, Practical Implications (New York: Columbia University Press, 2014) and co-editor of Animals and the Human Imagination: A Companion to Animal Studies (New York: Columbia University Press, 2012).
