= JDSF =

JDSF may stand for:

- Jackson Demonstration State Forest, a forest in California, US
- Japan DanceSport Federation, member of the World DanceSport Federation
- JD Sports Fashion, British retail company
- John Dau Sudan Federation, non-profit organization in Sudan

== See also ==
- Japan Self-Defense Forces
