= Tree of Codes =

2010 art book by Jonathan Safran Foer

- Author: Jonathan Safran Foer
- Illustrator: Sara De Bondt
- Cover artist: Jon Gray
- Language: English
- Genre: Fiction, Ergodic
- Published: London
- Publisher: Visual Editions
- Publication date: November 2010
- Media type: Paperback
- Pages: 139
- Awards: D&AD In Book Award, Book Design, 2011
- ISBN: 9780956569219
- OCLC: 676728609
- Preceded by: Eating Animals
- Followed by: Here I Am

Tree of Codes is an artwork, in the form of a book, created by Jonathan Safran Foer, and published in 2010. To create the book, Foer took Bruno Schulz's book The Street of Crocodiles and cut out the majority of the words. The publisher, Visual Editions, describes it as a "sculptural object." Foer himself explains the writing process as follows: "I took my favorite book, Bruno Schulz’s Street of Crocodiles, and by removing words carved out a new story".

Due to the physical difficulties involved in printing a book where most of the words have been cut out, Foer stated that he had to contact several different publishers before finding one who was willing to print it. The only printing office who could do the job was die Keure, from Belgium. He also said that due to the way the book had to be bound, it could not be produced in a hardcover edition.

== Reception ==
The Times described it as "a true work of art." Heather Wagner at Vanity Fair called it "a quietly stunning work of art." Michel Faber, at The Guardian, said that while Foer showed a strong sense of poetry, the book was less successful as a work of fiction.

== Adaptations ==
The book was adapted into a ballet by choreographer Wayne McGregor, composer Jamie xx, and visual artist Olafur Eliasson. It was first shown in the UK as part of the Manchester International Festival in July 2015, for which it was commissioned, and subsequently received its US premiere at the Park Avenue Armory in September 2015.

Australian composer Liza Lim adapted the book into an opera. The joint production by Cologne Opera and Hellerau featured ensemble musikFabrik and premiered on 9 April 2016. The cast included Emily Hindrichs as Adela, Christian Miedl as the Son and Carl Rosman as the Mutant Bird. The opera's US debut took place at the 2018 Spoleto Festival USA in Charleston, South Carolina in a new production under the direction of Ong Keng Sen. The cast for this production featured Marisol Montalvo as Adela, Elliot Madore as the Son, and Walter Dundervill as The Dresser.
