= Joan Hecht =

American singer

Joan Hecht is an American humanitarian and award-winning author of the book The Journey of the Lost Boys. She is also the founder and President of the 501 c-3 non-profit Alliance for the Lost Boys of Sudan, an organization that assists with the health and educational needs of Lost Boys and their families living in the United States and Africa. Hecht formerly traveled as a back-up singer for The Johnny Van Zant Band and began recording professionally at age 14. However, she is best known for her work related to the Lost Boys of Sudan, including engaging in public speaking on their behalf and that of the people of South Sudan, as well as writing an award-winning book about them titled, "The Journey of the Lost Boys".

== Biography ==
Hecht first encountered the Lost Boys in 2001, when 85 of the approximately 3800 refugees who had relocated to the United States settled in Jacksonville, Florida. Hecht became a mentor to the Lost Boys of Sudan and continues to assist the Lost Boys and the people of South Sudan on a volunteer basis, as they acclimate to life in the US and struggle to assist remaining family members and friends in South Sudan. Prior to meeting the Lost Boys of Sudan, Hecht had worked as an executive in sales and marketing and also as a professional singer, backing Johnny Van Zant. In 2002, after Ezekiel Kong Deng — one of the refugees whom she had unofficially adopted — died following a failed liver transplant, Hecht conceived the idea of creating a Foundation to assist the refugees.

In 2004, she founded the Alliance for the Lost Boys of Sudan. She serves as director for the organization, which provides aid for educational and medical needs to the refugees in the United States as well as in Africa, where it also provides basic survival needs and assists in funding the construction of clinics and schools, housing at orphanages and hospitals and the drilling of eight water wells that provide clean drinking water for thousands of rural villagers. . In 2005, she released the book The Journey of the Lost Boys, a narrative of the experiences of these refugees, which earned "First Place in Education" and garnered Hecht the title of "2005 Author of Year" by the Promoting Outstanding Writers organization of Mandarin. She has also been since 2007 the volunteer chairwoman of education on the Board of Directors for The Lost Boys and Girls of Sudan National Network, based in Washington DC.

== Honors and awards ==
In 2007, Bank of America named Hecht one of its "Local Heroes" for her humanitarian efforts, and early in 2008, the Sunshine State Teachers of English to Speakers of Other Languages of Florida awarded Hecht its President's Award for the same. In October 2008, Florida Governor Charlie Crist named Hecht a "Point of Light" for her work with the refugees, commenting that "Over the past seven years, Joan has worked tirelessly on behalf of the Lost Boys of Sudan.... Her efforts to provide mentoring opportunities have helped Sudanese youth discover their dreams and potential." Hecht also received The Points of Light Award from the National Points of Light Institute, which was founded by President George H. W. Bush. Hecht and her family, along with local Lost Boys were featured in Disney's November 2007 's Family Fun magazine, which in coordination with the Hands on Network, selected them as the 2007 grand prize winners of its "Family Fun Volunteers Contest."
