= Extremely Loud & Incredibly Close (film) =

2011 American drama film directed by Stephen Daldry

- Theatrical release poster
- Directed by: Stephen Daldry
- Screenplay by: Eric Roth
- Based on: Extremely Loud & Incredibly Close by Jonathan Safran Foer
- Produced by: Scott Rudin
- Starring: Tom Hanks; Sandra Bullock; Thomas Horn; Max von Sydow; Viola Davis; John Goodman; Jeffrey Wright; Zoe Caldwell
- Cinematography: Chris Menges
- Edited by: Claire Simpson
- Music by: Alexandre Desplat
- Production company: Scott Rudin Productions
- Distributed by: Warner Bros. Pictures; Paramount Pictures
- Release date: December 25, 2011
- Running time: 129 minutes
- Country: United States
- Language: English
- Budget: $40 million
- Box office: $55.2 million

Extremely Loud & Incredibly Close is a 2011 American drama film directed by Stephen Daldry and written by Eric Roth. Based on the 2005 novel of the same name by Jonathan Safran Foer, it stars Tom Hanks, Sandra Bullock, Thomas Horn in his film debut, Max von Sydow, Viola Davis, John Goodman, Jeffrey Wright, and Zoe Caldwell in her final film role. Production took place in New York City. The film had a limited release in the United States on December 25, 2011, by Warner Bros. Pictures, and a wide release on January 20, 2012, grossing over $55 million. Despite mixed reviews, the film was nominated for two Academy Awards, Best Picture and Best Supporting Actor for von Sydow, sparking controversy.

== Plot ==
Nine-year-old Oskar Schell is autistic and lives in New York City with his parents Linda and Thomas Schell. He is close to his father, who stimulates him with missions to hunt for clues to New York City's "lost Sixth Borough". The tasks he is given force him to explore his surroundings and communicate with others, which is not easy for him.

On September 11, 2001, schools close early, so Oskar arrives home alone to find six answering machine messages left by his father from the World Trade Center. He hides under his bed, where his grandmother finds him and stays until Linda returns. Oskar is angry at his father's funeral, especially as the casket is empty, unable to make sense of his death.

A year later, Oskar has a secret hiding place with memories of his father, including the answering machine with its messages. In his father's room, he accidentally shatters a vase, and inside finds a key in an envelope with the word "Black" on it. He becomes obsessed with finding the lock the key fits, believing it a clue from his father.

Oskar finds 472 Blacks in the New York phone book, so plans to visit each one. He lies to his mother, with whom he is becoming increasingly distant, about his outings. He first meets Abby Black, who is in the starting process of a divorce, but she tells Oskar she did not know his father. Further encounters continue to be fruitless, but he meets a variety of people, photographing and recording notes on each one in a scrapbook.

One day, Oskar ventures into his grandmother's apartment, but instead of finding her there, encounters the reclusive elderly renter that has been living there, whom his grandmother had warned him to avoid. The renter does not speak, communicating instead with the words "yes" and "no" tattooed on his hands and a writing pad. Oskar confides in him, and the man offers to accompany Oskar on his outings.

As they explore the city together, Oskar learns to face his fears, such as those of public transport and bridges. Eventually, he concludes that the stranger is his grandfather. Oskar plays the increasingly desperate answering machine recordings for him, but the man becomes agitated. He refuses to listen to the final one, and tells Oskar to stop his search. Later, Oskar sees him arguing with his grandmother and packing to leave, so he angrily tries to confront him as his taxi pulls away, saying he knows he is his long-estranged grandfather.

Oskar then notices a phone number for an estate sale circled on the back of a newspaper clipping of his father's. When he dials the number, he reaches a surprised Abby, who takes Oskar to meet her ex-husband William. William realizes that Oskar's key is the one he has been looking for, which had been left to him in the vase by his own now deceased father. William had not known the key was in the vase when he had sold the vase to Oskar's father at the estate sale.

Oskar confides to William that on the day of the attacks, he was home when the phone rang a sixth time, but was too afraid to answer. After witnessing the tower collapse on TV as the phone call cut off, he bought a replacement answering machine so his mother would never find out. He leaves the key with William, but runs away from Abby, distraught.

Back in his room, Oskar proceeds to destroy the material from his search, until his mother reveals to him that she had been aware of all his outings, and had gone ahead of him to meet all the Blacks to prepare them for his visit. Finally realizing how much his mother cares about him, he accepts his father's death and writes letters to all the people he met to thank them for their kindness. This includes his grandfather, who he asks to return home, which he does, to live with his grandmother. Oskar gives his mother his scrapbook from his adventures filled with pop-ups and pull tabs, titled "Extremely Loud and Incredibly Close".

Soon after, Oskar visits a spot in Central Park he and his father frequented, and looking underneath his father's favorite swing, finds a message from his father. He congratulates him for finishing what would have been their final expedition, giving Oskar the closure he desperately needed.

== Cast ==
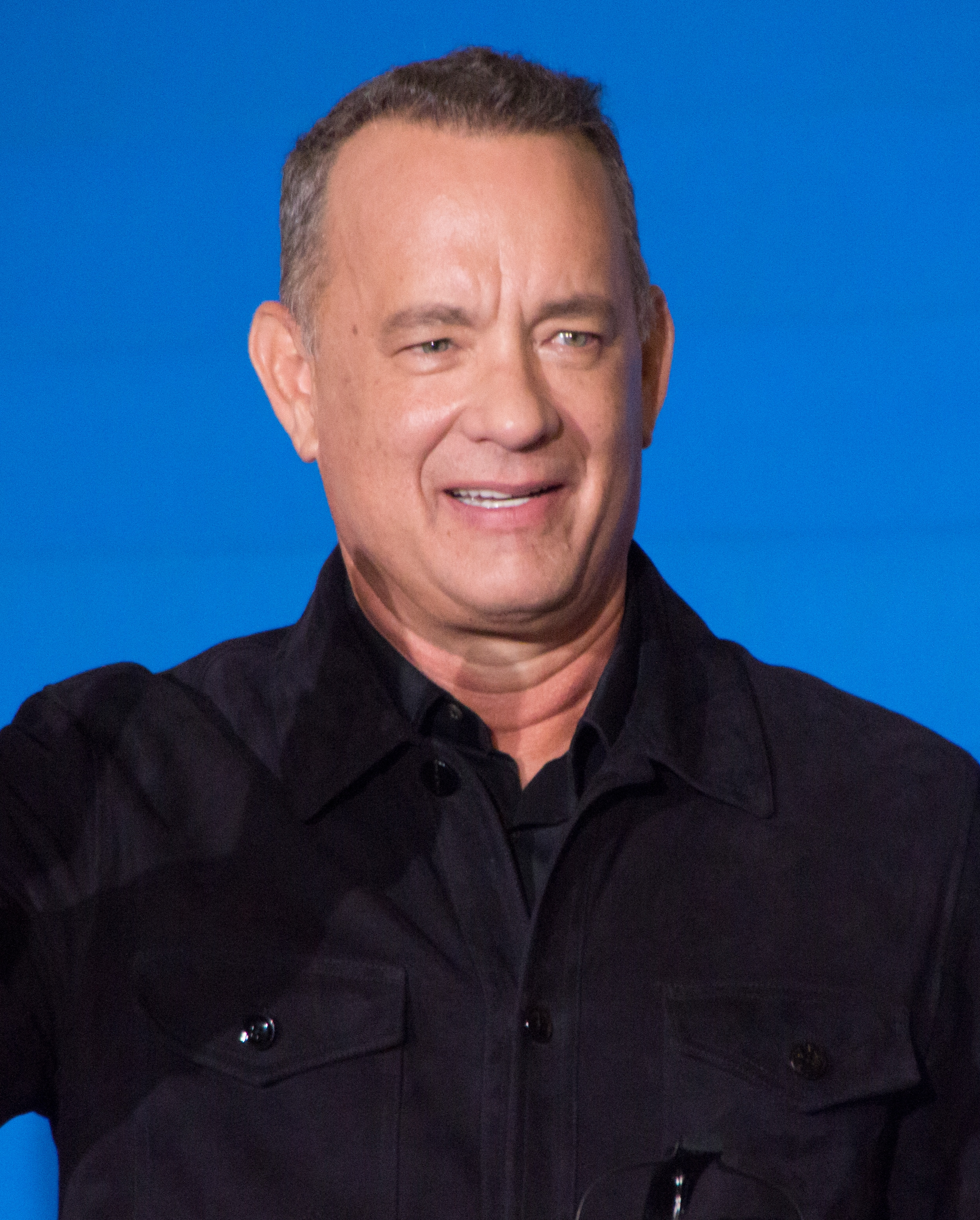
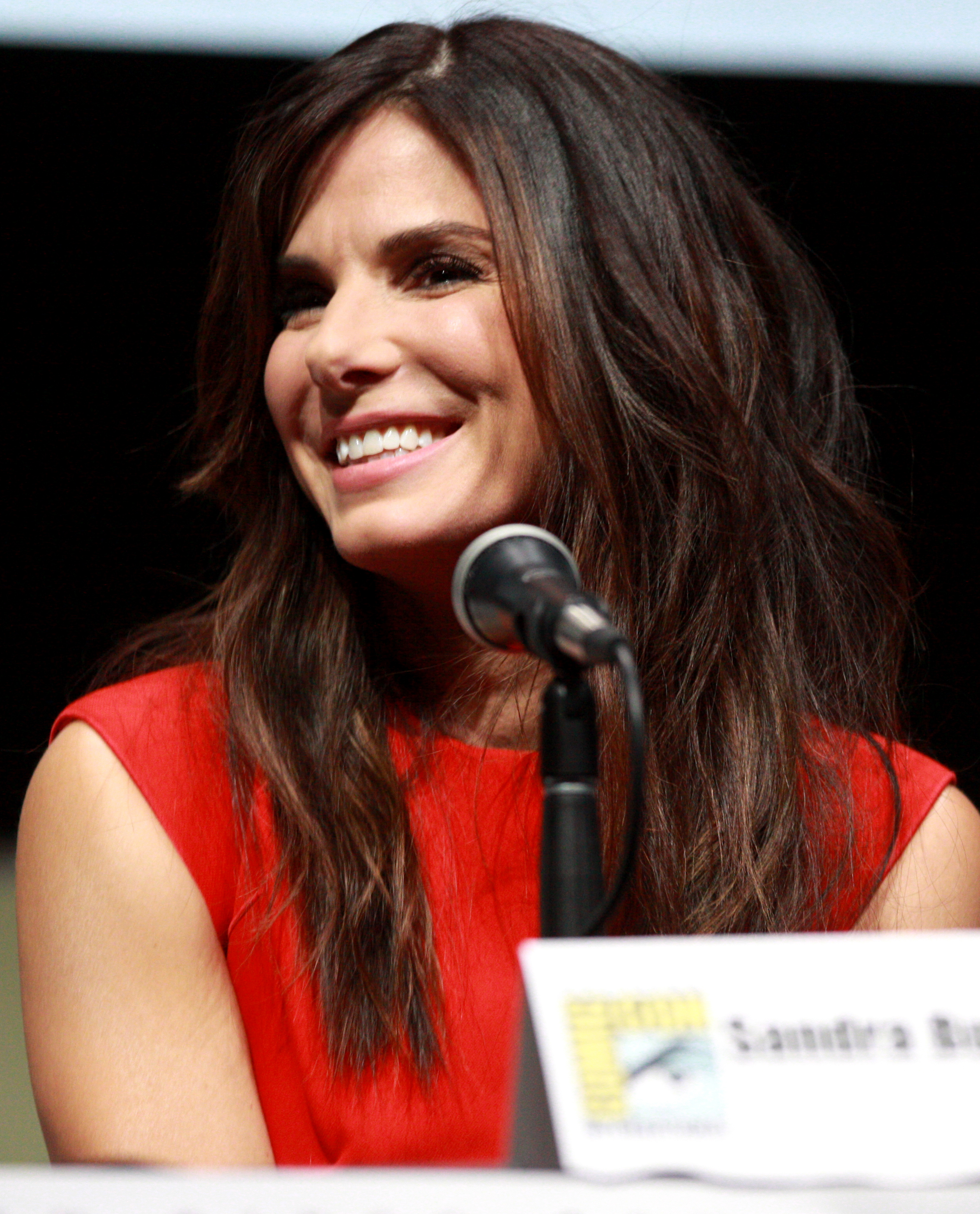
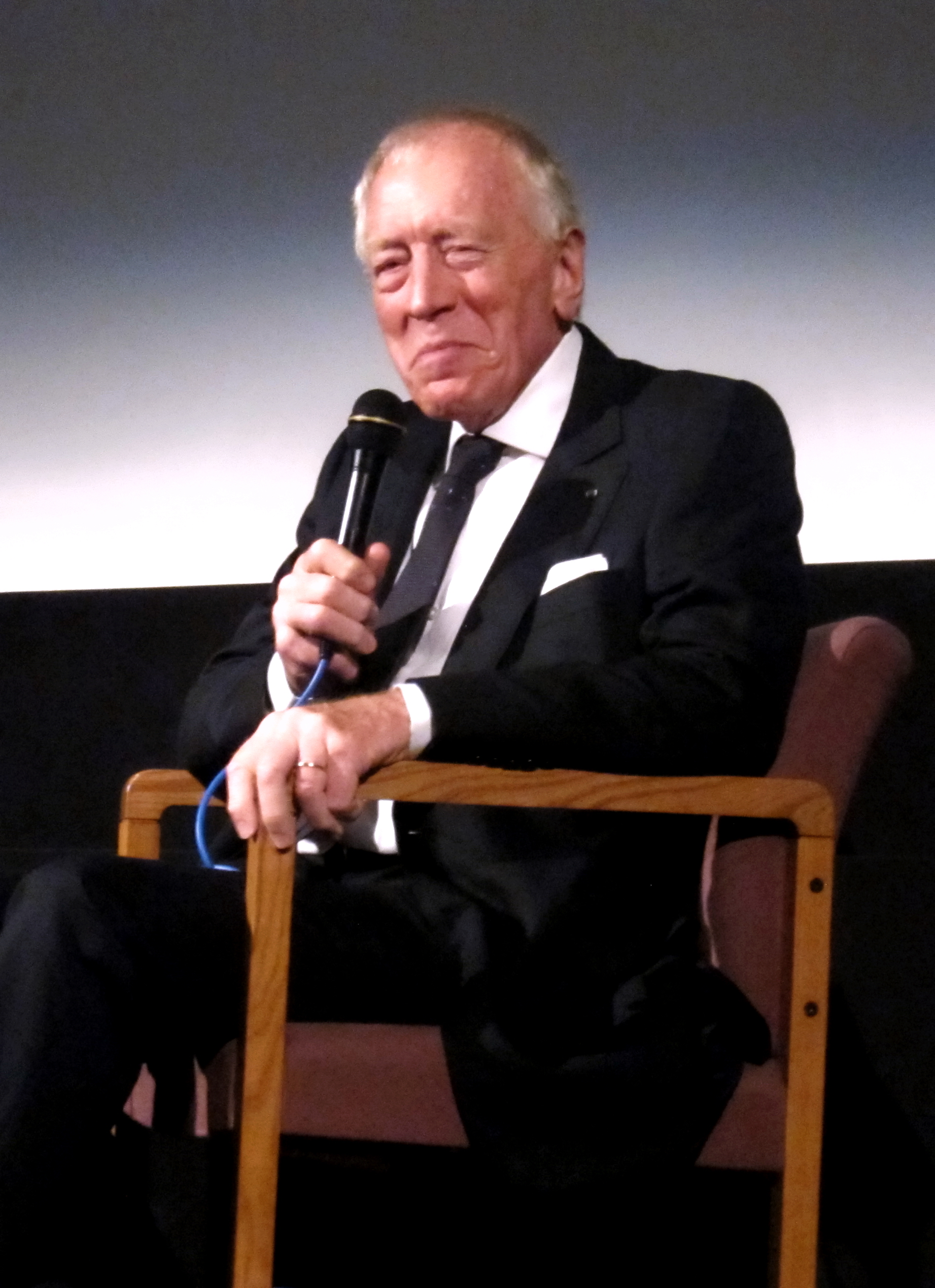
Tom Hanks (left), Sandra Bullock and Max von Sydow play Thomas, Linda Schell and the Renter respectively. Sydow garnered critical acclaim for his performance as the Renter, earning a nomination for the Academy Award for Best Supporting Actor.
- Tom Hanks as Thomas Schell
- Sandra Bullock as Linda Schell
- Thomas Horn as Oskar Schell
- Max von Sydow as The Renter
- Viola Davis as Abby Black
- Madison Arnold as Alan Black
- John Goodman as Stan the Doorman
- Jeffrey Wright as William Black
- Zoe Caldwell as Oskar's grandmother
- Hazelle Goodman as Hazelle Black
- Adrian Martinez as Hector Black
- Stephen Henderson as Walt the Locksmith
- Stephanie Kurtzuba as Elaine Black
- Catherine Curtin as Leigh-Anne Black

== Production ==
=== Development ===
In August 2010, it was reported that director Stephen Daldry and producer Scott Rudin had been working on a film adaptation of the novel for five years. Eric Roth was hired to write the script. Extremely Loud & Incredibly Close is a co-production with Paramount Pictures and Warner Bros., with Warner being the "lead studio". Chris Menges served as director of photography (replacing Harris Savides, who dropped out after the discovery of his brain cancer), K. K. Barrett as production designer and Ann Roth as costume designer.

=== Casting ===
Tom Hanks and Sandra Bullock were the first to be cast in the film. A nationwide search for child actors between the ages of 9 and 13 began in late October 2010 for the role of Oskar Schell. Thomas Horn, who had won over $30,000 at age 12 on the 2010 Jeopardy! Kids Week, was chosen for the role in December 2010. Horn had had no prior acting interest but was approached by the producers based on his quiz-show appearance. On January 3, 2011 The Hollywood Reporter announced that John Goodman joined the cast. Nico Muhly was credited in the film poster as the composer, but on October 21, 2011, it was reported that Alexandre Desplat was chosen to compose the score. Similarly, James Gandolfini was credited on the initial poster, and was originally in the film as a love interest for Bullock's character. Test audiences reacted negatively to their scenes together, and he was cut. Austrian actress Senta Berger was offered a role in the film, but declined.

=== Characterization ===
Daldry stated in an interview that the film is about "a special child who is somewhere on the autistic spectrum, trying to find his own logic – trying to make sense of something that literally doesn't make sense to him." When asked how much research was necessary to realistically portray a character with such a condition, he answered "we did a lot of research", and that he "spent a lot of time with different experts of Asperger's and talked to them." In the film, Oskar reveals that he was tested for Asperger syndrome, but the results were inconclusive. As Daldry explained: "Every child is different on the autistic spectrum, so we created our own version of a child that was in some way – not heavily, but somewhere on that spectrum in terms of the fears and the phobias." There are no references to autism in the novel. Author Jonathan Safran Foer stated in an interview that he had never thought of Oskar as autistic, but added, "Which is not to say he isn't – it's really up for readers to decide. It's not to say that plenty of descriptions of him wouldn't be fitting, only that I didn't have them in mind at the time."

=== Filming ===
Principal photography was expected to begin in January, but started in March 2011. Filming went on hiatus in June. On May 16, 2011, scenes were shot on the streets of the Lower East Side and Chinatown. Cranes were used to shoot scenes on the corner of Orchard Street and Grand Street. Extremely Loud & Incredibly Close was filmed with an Arri Alexa and was the first Hollywood feature film to use Arri's ArriRaw format to store the data for post-production. Several scenes for the film were shot in Central Park, a location that is integral to the storyline, near The Lake and Wollman Rink. The Seaport Jewelry Exchange on Fulton St. was used for a pivotal scene in the film when Oskar is searching through a jewelry store and its back room.

== Release ==
Daldry had hoped to have the film released around the tenth anniversary of the terrorist attacks of September 11, 2001. A test screening took place in New York on September 25, 2011, to a positive reaction. Extremely Loud & Incredibly Close had a limited release in the United States on December 25, 2011, and a wide release on January 20, 2012. It was released in the United Kingdom on February 17, 2012.

=== Home media release ===
The film was released in Blu-ray, DVD, and digital download formats in Region 1 on March 27, 2012.

== Reception ==
=== Critical response ===
Review aggregation website Rotten Tomatoes reported a 44% approval rating and an average rating of 5.60/10 based on 189 reviews. The website's consensus reads, "Extremely Loud & Incredibly Close has a story worth telling, but it deserves better than the treacly and pretentious treatment director Stephen Daldry gives it." Metacritic, which assigns a weighted average score out of 100 to reviews from mainstream critics, gives the film a score of 46 based on 41 reviews. Audiences polled by CinemaScore gave the film an average grade of "A-" on an A+ to F scale.

Critics were sharply divided about the subject matter of the film. Betsy Sharkey of the Los Angeles Times wrote that the film was a "handsomely polished, thoughtfully wrapped Hollywood production about the national tragedy of 9/11 that seems to have forever redefined words like 'unthinkable,' 'unforgivable,' 'catastrophic'." Andrea Peyser of the New York Post called it "Extremely, incredibly exploitive" and a "quest for emotional blackmail, cheap thrills and a naked ploy for an Oscar." Peter Howell of the Toronto Star gave the film one out of four stars, saying that "[the] film feels all wrong on every level, mistaking precociousness for perceptiveness and catastrophe for a cuddling session. It's calculated as Oscar bait, but the bait is poisoned by opportunism and feigned sensitivity".

=== Accolades ===
Award	Category	Nominee	Result
84th Academy Awards	Best Picture	Scott Rudin	Nominated
84th Academy Awards	Best Supporting Actor	Max von Sydow	Nominated
Boston Film Critics	Best Supporting Actor	Max von Sydow	Nominated
Art Directors Guild	Best Art Direction in a Contemporary Film	K.K. Barrett	Nominated
Broadcast Film Critics Association Awards	Best Picture		Nominated
Broadcast Film Critics Association Awards	Best Director	Stephen Daldry	Nominated
Broadcast Film Critics Association Awards	Best Young Actor/Actress	Thomas Horn	Won
Broadcast Film Critics Association Awards	Best Adapted Screenplay	Eric Roth	Nominated
Dallas-Fort Worth Film Critics Association	Best Picture		Nominated
Dallas-Fort Worth Film Critics Association	Best Supporting Actor	Max von Sydow	Nominated
Georgia Film Critics Association	Best Supporting Actor	Max von Sydow	Nominated
Georgia Film Critics Association	Best Supporting Actress	Sandra Bullock	Nominated
Houston Film Critics Society	Best Picture		Nominated
Phoenix Film Critics Society	Best Original Score	Alexandre Desplat	Nominated
Phoenix Film Critics Society	Best Performance by a Youth in a Lead or Supporting Role – Male	Thomas Horn	Won
Phoenix Film Critics Society	Breakthrough Performance on Camera	Thomas Horn	Won
San Diego Film Critics Society Awards	Best Supporting Actor	Max von Sydow	Nominated
San Diego Film Critics Society Awards	Best Score	Alexandre Desplat	Nominated
Teen Choice Awards	Choice Movie Actress – Drama	Sandra Bullock	Nominated

=== Best Picture nomination controversy ===
Before the film's release, Extremely Loud & Incredibly Close was expected to be a major contender at the 84th Academy Awards (Stephen Daldry's previous two films had garnered Best Picture nominations). However, due to the film's polarized reception and being ignored by most of the critics groups' awards – namely, the Golden Globes, the BAFTAs, and the Screen Actors Guild Awards – it was no longer deemed a major contender. Nevertheless, the film was nominated for Best Picture and Max von Sydow for Best Supporting Actor. Critics and audiences criticized the film's nomination for Best Picture, with some calling the film one of the worst Best Picture nominees ever. Chris Krapek of The Huffington Post wrote very negatively about the film's nomination, calling the film "not only the worst reviewed Best Picture nominee of the last 10 years, [but] easily the worst film of 2011". Paste Magazine's Adam Vitcavage called the film's consensus for a Best Picture nominee "certainly the worst for at least 28 years", and David Gritten of The Telegraph called the nomination "mysterious".

Many critics have blamed the new Best Picture rules for the nomination. John Young at Entertainment Weekly said that, when it comes to the new rules, "it's better to be loved by a small and passionate group instead of liked by a much larger group", and Jen Chaney at The Washington Post believes that "the Academy should've just stuck to the 10 rule so that films like Dragon Tattoo or Harry Potter could've joined the other worthy contenders, because if you're going to create a bunch of drama around the number of nominees and then come up one shy of what has become the typical total, that just feels like a letdown." The Week wrote that the new rules are a failure, as it lets "smaller, divisive movies that the Academy had hoped to weed out, like Tree of Life and Extremely Loud and Incredibly Close, in, but prevents critically-praised crowd pleasers like Bridesmaids and The Girl With the Dragon Tattoo from being nominated."

On the other hand, awards pundit Tom O'Neil defended the nomination and the film, stating: "This is a movie that we unwisely wrote off, but we did it because we believed the critics. This movie delivers. It is a superb motion picture. It is moving, it is relevant to our time, it is extremely well made."

At the 84th Academy Awards, Extremely Loud & Incredibly Close lost in both of its categories (Best Picture to The Artist and Best Supporting Actor to Christopher Plummer for Beginners).

In 2024, Metacritic listed the film as the lowest-scoring Best Picture nominee of the past 40 years, stating "Though the film looked on paper like a surefire awards-season favorite, critics found it manipulative, and its Oscar hopes were all but shot when it received [two nominations] but nothing else. It's the worst-reviewed best picture nominee of the past four decades—and, quite possibly, even longer."

=== Autism controversy ===
Several reviews spoke disparagingly of Oskar as an autistic character, with autism advocacy groups criticizing the response. The New York Times' Manohla Dargis proclaimed that in real life Oskar "would be one of those children who inspire some adults to coo and cluck while reminding others of how grateful they are to be child-free." Mick LaSalle of the San Francisco Chronicle called him "creepy," "weird," "snappish" and "superior."

Autism Key's Michelle Gonzalez found the trend disturbing. "It appears that many moviegoers and critics take issue with the way children with autism behave and speak," she wrote.

== Soundtrack ==
Title	Songwriter, song performer and music composer
"If You Know The Lord Is Keeping You"	Charles Taylor
"Cleo's Back"	Little Freddie King and Willie J. Woods
All Music	Alexandre Desplat

== See also ==
- List of cultural references to the September 11 attacks
- Oscar bait
