= John Dau Foundation =

Non-profit health organization in Sudan

- Founded: 2005
- Founder: John Dau
- Type: International Health Charity
- Purpose: HIV, Health, Maternal Health
- Location: P.O. Box 1234 Alexandria, VA 22313
- Origins: Lost Boys of Sudan
- Region served: South Sudan
- Method: Healthcare
- Key people: John Dau (President)
- Employees: 200
- Website: www.johndaufoundation.com

The John Dau Foundation, also known as John Dau Sudan Foundation, is a 501(c)(3) nonprofit that was established in July 2005 to develop health facilities that currently do not exist for most of the populations of Duk, Twic East and Bor South Counties in the State of Jonglei in South Sudan. Its mission is to "transform healthcare in South Sudan." Currently, the organization's primary focus is on funding and overseeing the Duk Lost Boys Clinic. The Duk Lost Boys Clinic specializes in the treatment of diseases such as guinea worm disease, malaria, chicken pox, diarrhea, malnourishment, bilharzias, h-worm, kalazar; the immunization of other diseases; and the provision of maternity services. The foundation was originally headquartered in Syracuse, New York.

== John Dau ==
John Dau also known as Dhieu Deng Leek is the founder and president of the John Dau Foundation. Dau is a survivor of the civil war in South Sudan and part of the exodus of the Lost Boys of Sudan who were forced to flee their families and homeland. Dau was featured in the award-winning documentary God Grew Tired of Us in 2006 which won the Grand Jury Prize and the Audience Award at the 2006 Sundance Film Festival. Dau currently lives in Richmond, Virginia.

== Ties to the government of South Sudan ==
John Dau has strong ties to local governmental officials in South Sudan. His uncle, Philip Thon Leek, who was a governor of the State of Jongeli and is now a Minister of Transport in the Government of National Unity, has been instrumental in providing contacts and support from the natives, Tribal Chiefs and the Sudanese Peoples Liberation Movements and its Health Ministry. The foundation has received various commitments and support from the local government, however, it relies significantly on private donors and NGO funding.

== American Care for Sudan Foundation ==
In June 2008, the American Care for Sudan Foundation announced that it would merge with the John Dau Foundation as its operational wing. American Care was formed initially under the leadership of John Dau and the dedication and hard work of a group of members of the First Presbyterian Church of Skaneateles to build the Duk Lost Boys Clinic in Duk Payuel, South Sudan in early 2007.

== Notable contributions ==
Notable contributions to the Duk Lost Boys Clinic and John Dau Foundation include $100,000 donated by Brad Pitt and Angelina Jolie (the Jolie-Pitt Foundation) in 2006; $50,000 by the Allyn Family of Welch Allyn in 2006; $25,000 by Volvo in 2008; and $100,000 by United Technologies Corporation in 2008.
