= Finkelhor =

Finkelhor is a surname. Notable people with the surname include:

- David Finkelhor (born 1947), American sociologist
- Dorothy Finkelhor (1902–1988), American academic
