= Lyle Owerko =

Canadian filmmaker and photographer

- Born: Lyle Owerko; Calgary, Alberta, Canada
- Education: Pratt Institute
- Occupations: Photojournalism, Director
- Notable credit: His TIME cover picture of WTC attack have been called one of the most important in 40 years.
- Website: lyleowerko.com

Lyle Owerko is a filmmaker and photographer whose work has ranged from Sundance Channel to Time to MTV. His photos are collected by many business, entertainment and celebrity clients. They have been used in several films including Henry Singer's The Falling Man and The Omen, as well as books such as Jonathan Safran Foer's Extremely Loud and Incredibly Close. His work is also included in the permanent archive of the Library of Congress in Washington DC. Owerko travels extensively around the world each year shooting assignments and personal work. He resides in New York City.

== Early life ==
Lyle Owerko was raised in Calgary, Alberta, Canada. He studied at the Pratt Institute in Brooklyn, New York. This is where he earned a Masters in Science degree in the communication arts program.

== Career ==
=== Photography and fine art ===
In 2005 Princeton Architectural Press published Jennifer New's book Drawing From Life, which featured Owerko's journals as well as those of Mike Figgis, David Byrne, Carol Beckwith and Maira Kalman.

In 2006 Owerko traveled to Africa as part of Dr. Jeffrey Sachs’ Millennium Promise initiative, documenting the lives of the Lau people of Sauri, Kenya. Current initiatives range from the multi-media exhibition, to an art installation of large-scale portraits of the Samburu Warrior tribe.

In 2010 Abrams published The Boombox Project, his historical overview of the history of a seminal pop-culture icon. The books release was covered by many news outlets including The New York Times, New York Magazine, The Huffington Post, Fast Company, CBS News, and National Public Radio. That same year Hasselblad Cameras named him a "Hasselblad Master" for his work as a fine art photojournalist.

Lyle's work can be seen in many museum and private collections including the Victoria & Albert in London, which holds part of his Boombox collection in their permanent archive of 20th-century historically significant objects. His work can be seen at Jackson Fine Art in Atlanta, and Whisper Fine Art in London.

=== Journalism ===
Owerko shot the photograph featured on the cover of Time on September 11, 2001, the day of the 9/11 attacks, which showed the impact of United Airlines Flight 175. In 2005 the American Society of Magazine Editors ranked it as 25th out of a list of the 40 most important magazine covers in the last 40 years. Since 2001, Lyle Owerko has been profiled and given interviews about that day and his work.

A portion of Owerko’s personal work as a photographer can be viewed in the self-published book And No Birds Sang, featuring images he took from September 11, 2001.

=== Music videos ===
Owerko has worked with a number of musicians including Jesse Harris, Rufus Wainwright and American Hi-Fi. He shot the music video for the first single on Jesse Harris' 2007 album Feel. He also directed a tour documentary for American Hi-Fi's 2001 tour and his photo of a smashed boombox became the cover for the album Rock n'Roll Noodle Shop: Live from Tokyo. In 2012 Lyle directed a series of music videos for Jesse Harris using purely an iPhone, which included the songs Sad Blues and I Won't Wait In 2013 he also directed the video for the title track of Jesse Harris' album "Borne Away".

=== Advertising ===
Owerko has directed Robert Redford in a series of Sundance Channel commercial spots. He also worked with Compound shooting live action elements for the 1999 IBM e-culture campaign that led to a Grand Prix at the Cannes Lions International Advertising Festival.

=== Awards ===
- New York Art Directors Club
- National Press Photographers Association
- American Photography
