= Louis Newman =

Louis Newman may refer to:

- Louis E. Newman, professor of religious studies
- Louis Israel Newman (1893–1972), Reform rabbi and author
