= The Journey of the Lost Boys =

The Journey of the Lost Boys (2005) is a non-fiction book by Joan Hecht about The Lost Boys of Sudan. "The Lost Boys"are a group of young children who became separated from their parents due to civil war in their homeland. With little food and water and no protection from wild animals and enemy soldiers that stalked them night and day, these children banded together walking over a thousand miles across the wilds of Africa in search of safe refuge.

The Journey of the Lost Boys is a chronological timeline of the epic journey taken by these children, beginning in their rural villages of Southern Sudan and arrival as young men in the United States. Narrated by Joan Hecht based on the experiences of the Lost Boys, one of their American mentors, whom they lovingly call "mom" or "Mama Joan;" it is a compelling story of courage, faith, and the sheer determination to survive by a group of young orphaned boys called "The Lost Boys of Sudan". Because of Ms.Hecht's personal relationship with the "Lost Boys", she is able to portray their story intimately. In addition to Hecht's extensive research regarding the political and historical events surrounding the civil war between the North and South, are the heart-rending personal stories, photos and drawings of the boys themselves.

The book took "first place in education" at the Promoting Outstanding Writers (POW) International Book Awards, earning Ms. Hecht the title "2005 Author of the Year".

In the summer of 2004, Ms. Hecht founded the "Alliance for the Lost Boys of Sudan" a non- profit foundation, which assists with the medical and educational needs of Lost Boys and their Lost Boys, their families, and communities in the United States and Africa.
