= Point Park University =

Private university in Pittsburgh, Pennsylvania, US

- Former names: Point Park Junior College (1960–1966); Point Park College (1966–2004)
- Motto: Latin: Pro Arte, Pro Communitate, Pro Professione
- Motto in English: For Knowledge, For Community, For Career
- Type: Private university
- Established: 1960; 66 years ago
- Endowment: $50.1 million (2022)
- President: Chris W. Brussalis
- Students: 3,288
- Undergraduates: 2,575
- Postgraduates: 870
- Location: Pittsburgh, Pennsylvania, U.S. 40°26′19″N 80°00′07″W
- Campus: Urban
- Newspaper: The Point Park Globe
- Colors: Green & Gold
- Nickname: Pioneers
- Sporting affiliations: NCAA Division II - MEC
- Mascot: Black Diamond II the Bison
- Website: pointpark.edu
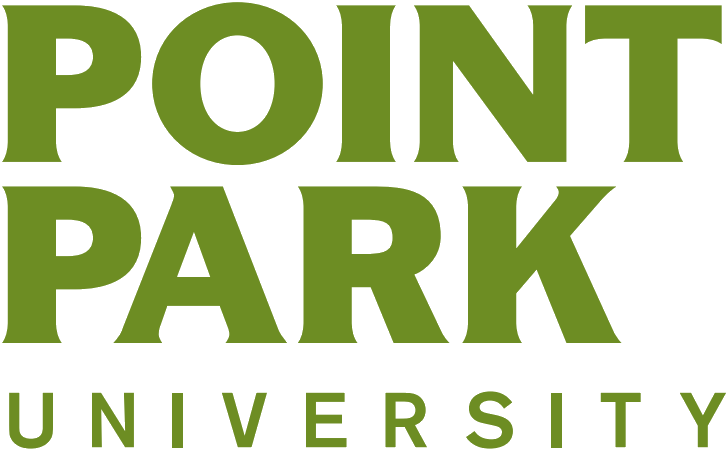

Point Park University is a private university in Pittsburgh, Pennsylvania, United States. Formerly known as Point Park College, the school name was revised in 2004 to reflect the number of graduate programs being offered. In 2021, it had a total undergraduate enrollment of 2,575 students.

== History ==
=== Beginnings ===
The university began in 1933 as a one-room business school called Business Training College with an initial enrollment of 50 students, under the direction of Dorothy Finkelhor, a New York native, and her husband, L. Herbert Finkelhor. Finkelhor provided her students with business and secretarial skills. At the same time, she served in multiple roles as teacher, the dean of women, social chairman, janitor, telephone operator, admissions and finance director, and registrar.

=== Becoming a college ===
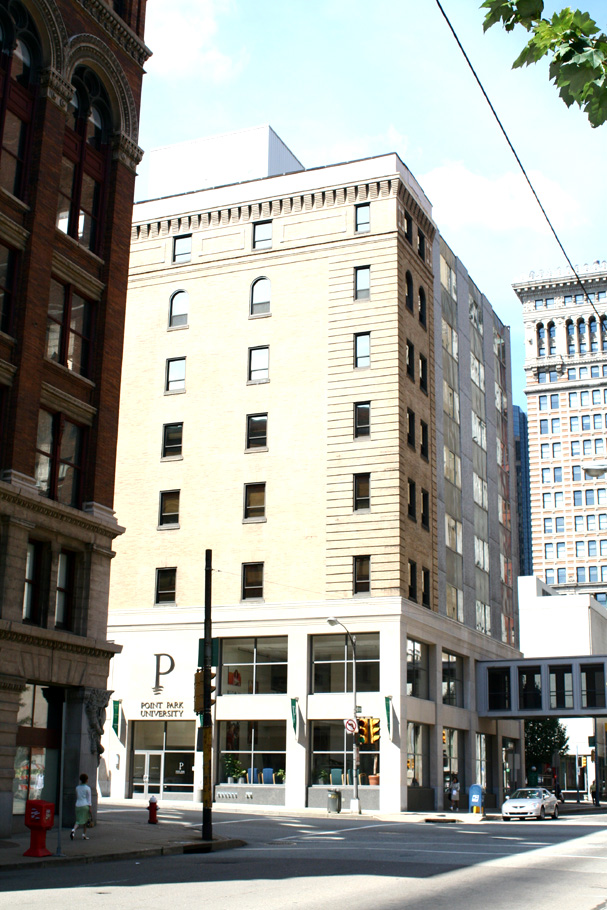
Academic Hall contains offices and classrooms.

By 1960, the business school had grown to nearly 880 students and moved to the university's current academic center, Academic Hall, on Wood Street in central Downtown Pittsburgh. The Finkelhors' small secretarial school became "Point Park Junior College," named for the city's historic Point State Park. The junior college added two-year programs in engineering technology, education, and journalism. It also acquired a performing arts space at The Pittsburgh Playhouse in the Oakland neighborhood. In 1966, the college became "Point Park College."

Thirty-four years after forming the college, Dorothy Finkelhor retired in 1967. Finkelhor's son-in-law Arthur M. Blum succeeded her as president. Blum purchased the Sherwyn Hotel, a 20-story building across from Academic Hall, which became Lawrence Hall.

In the early 1970s, John V. Hopkins succeeded Blum, and in time enrollment grew beyond 1,000 students. In 1981, the school introduced its first postgraduate program, a master's degree in journalism and mass communication.

J. Matthew Simon became the college's next president in 1986, overseeing the acquisition of a new library, program growth, and the school's largest endowment. Simon retired in 2007, having taught at Point Park as a professor in the Department of Natural Sciences and Engineering Technology after his tenure as president.

=== Growth and change ===
Katherine Henderson was appointed president of the college in 1997. In 2003, the college was officially renamed Point Park University, and the administration began an aggressive $1 million branding campaign to attract more enrollment. Two years later, Henderson resigned from the presidency of Point Park while on a sabbatical.

The board of trustees named Paul Hennigan as Henderson's permanent successor at the beginning of the 2006 fall term. Hennigan has continued developing a new strategic plan. As part of the plan, the university purchased several downtown properties for development. Point Park is also involved in the city's efforts for downtown revitalization, owning properties along the coveted Fifth and Forbes corridor. Point Park purchased the building occupied by the YMCA of Greater Pittsburgh on the Boulevard of the Allies in the spring of 2008.

In 2015, the university began property development to create what it called a "New Academic Village," a multi-block area downtown that includes dining, recreation, housing, athletics, student services, and other general-use buildings. With the introduction of this initiative, Point Park evolved into one of the largest investors in Downtown Pittsburgh real estate development. The following year, Point Park University added a new center for journalism at the former location of Nathan's Famous hot dogs.

== Campus ==
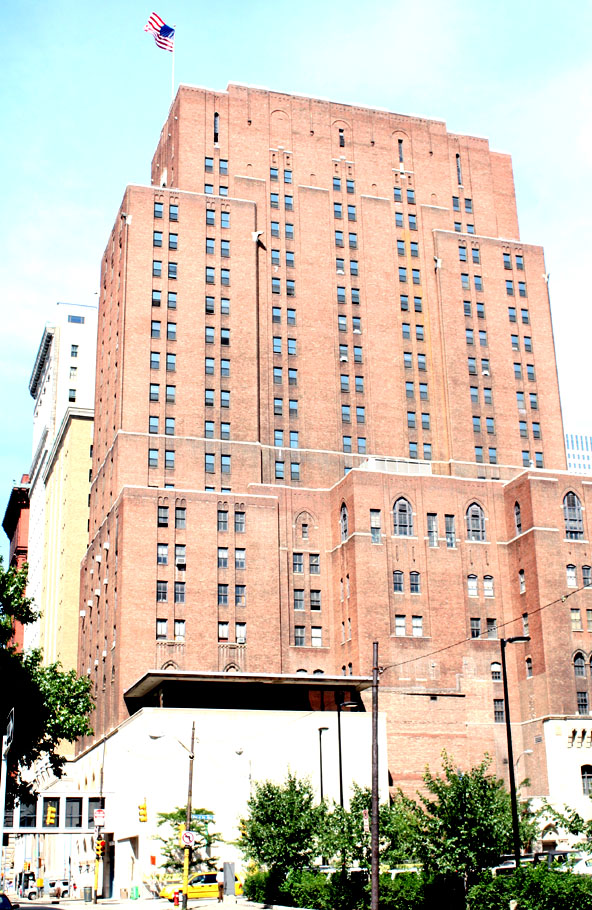
Lawrence Hall, the former Sherwyn Hotel, contains residence halls, offices, lounges, the Point Café, and classrooms

Point Park is situated about half a mile from Point State Park, the university's namesake, in the city's Golden Triangle. The school is in the midst of the business district, near both PPG Place (one of the most recognizable buildings in the city's skyline) and the relatively new LEED Platinum Certified headquarters of PNC Financial Services. The physical campus is mostly vertical, with buildings scattered among non-school structures. Since the campus is not contiguous, the school used the phrase "Pittsburgh is our campus" in its literature.

=== Department of Public Safety ===
The Campus is covered by the "Point Park University Department of Public Safety", a campus police agency which provides patrol and crime prevention services to the university. Point Park University was cited in 2017 as having the highest campus crime rate per student in Pittsburgh. The department, and in particular the Police Division, have been recognized for innovation in campus law enforcement, for example having become the first campus police agency in Pennsylvania to issue body-worn cameras to officers, and the creation of an anonymous tip app.

The executive of the Point Park University Department of Public Safety is the Assistant Vice President of Public Safety and Chief of Police, currently Jeff Besong, and is appointed by Point Park University. The department consists of two divisions: The Police Division provides patrol and crime scene interaction, while the Public Safety Division provides dispatch and security monitoring services. The Police Division was established in 2011 with five officers, and was initially limited to bike and foot patrol, and became accredited by the Pennsylvania Chiefs of Police Association in March 2013.

== Student life ==
=== Student government ===
The Student Government Association (SGA), formerly known as the United Student Government (USG) is the representative student government of Point Park University. SGA comprises two entities, the Executive Cabinet and the Legislative Body.

=== U View Television ===
U View Television is the student-run television station, which posts exclusively to YouTube.

== Athletics ==
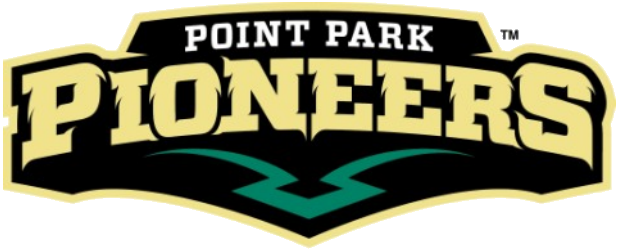
Pioneers wordmark

The Point Park athletic teams are called the Pioneers. The bison became a mascot for the school in 1967 when the Alpha Phi Omega fraternity teamed with the Varsity Club to acquire a live bison. The bison was named Black Diamond II in reference to the Black Diamond bison on the reverse side of the U.S. nickel at the time.

The baseball team plays at Point Park Field in Green Tree Park, which has served as its home field since fall 2010. The facility was previously used by the Duquesne Dukes baseball program from 1996 until the university discontinued the sport after the 2010 season.

== Notable alumni ==
- Rob Ashford – Won the Tony Award in 2002 for his choreography for Broadway's Thoroughly Modern Millie
- Panther Bior – One of the Lost Boys of Sudan, featured in the award-winning documentary film God Grew Tired of Us
- Caroline Collins - journalist, television news anchor, model, and former beauty pageant contestant
- Paul Costa – Member of the Pennsylvania House of Representatives
- Gerald M. Feierstein – diplomat
- Billy Hartung – Broadway/TV actor and dancer, played Chuck Cranston in Footloose and appeared in the 2002 film Chicago
- Michael Holley – Sports journalist
- Melina Kanakaredes – Actress and Daytime Emmy Award nominee
- Don Kelly - Major League Baseball player and manager
- Lydia B Kollins - drag queen
- Alicia Kozakiewicz – TV personality and child Internet safety advocate
- Elena LaQuatra - journalist, television news anchor, and former beauty pageant titleholder
- Fred McLeod – Sportscaster
- Dennis Miller – Comedian
- Matthew Noszka – Model
- Ed O'Ross - Film and TV actor
- Gino Anthony Pesi – Actor, producer, director, and writer, known for his role on Shades of Blue
- Role Model - singer-songwriter
- Eileen Seeley – TV and film actress
- Charles Sheedy – Member of the West Virginia House of Delegates
- Megan Sikora – Broadway performer and dancer; appeared as Lorraine/Ensemble in 42nd Street
- Paige Spara – Actress known for her work in The Good Doctor and Kevin from Work
- Jaquel Spivey – Tony Award Nominee for A Strange Loop and Damian in the film version of Mean Girls
- Josie Valeri – American professional soccer player and scholar
