= John Dau =

One of the Lost Boys of Sudan

John Dau (Dhieu-Deng Leek)
- Born: Dhieu-Deng Leek; January 15, 1974 (age 52); Sudan
- Citizenship: American
- Education: BA
- Occupation: President
- Years active: 6
- Employer: John Dau Foundation
- Children: 3

John Dau, also known as Dhieu-Deng Leek is a human rights activist from South Sudan. He is one of the Lost Boys of Sudan who was featured in the 2006 award-winning documentary God Grew Tired of Us. In 2007, he founded the John Dau Foundation aiming to transform the health system in South Sudan.

== Background ==
Dau was born in the Dinka tribe in Sudan in 1974. In 1987, his village, Duk Payuel in Duk County, Jonglei, was attacked by government troops during the Second Sudanese Civil War. The violence separated his family, and Dau travelled on foot for three months until reaching his relatives in Ethiopia.

Dau told The 700 Club, "There were so many problems prevailing in our surrounding; like, starvation, thirst, the fear of being killed by other local people or the wild animals. The most difficult situation was the lack of safe drinking water."

Dau stayed in a refugee camp in Ethiopia for four years, but when civil war broke out in the region, he was once again forced to flee. As one of thousands of "Lost Boys of Sudan," Dau wandered hundreds of miles and faced disease, starvation, animal attacks and violence until arriving in Kenya. While living in the Kakuma refugee camp, he attended school for the first time and sat for the Kenya Certificate of Secondary Education exam in 2000. In 2001, he was one of 3,800 young Sudanese refugees resettled in the United States and one of 140 young people brought to Syracuse, New York.

After his resettlement, Dau reportedly experienced culture shock. He was ultimately capable to bring his mother and sister from Sudan.

Dau has an associate degree from Onondaga Community College. In 2011, he graduated with a degree in Policy Studies from Syracuse University's Maxwell School of Citizenship and Public Affairs.

Dau's move to the United States and early experiences in the country are the subject of the film God Grew Tired of Us, which won the Grand Jury Prize and the Audience Award at the 2006 Sundance Film Festival. The title of the documentary is a quote from Dau discussing the despair he and other Sudanese felt during the civil war. His memoir, also titled God Grew Tired of Us, was co-authored with Michael Sweeney and released in January 2007 by National Geographic Press.

In over a decade in the United States, Dau has received several awards for his public achievements and charitable work. He received a National Geographic Emerging Explorers Award and was named a Volvo for Life Award finalist in the Quality of Life Category in 2008 which carried a contribution of $25,000 to the John Dau Sudan Foundation.

== Advocacy and public engagement ==
Following his resettlement in the United States, John Dau founded the John Dau Foundation, a non-profit health organization in Sudan, in 2007. Through the foundation, he established the Duk Lost Boys Clinic in Duk Payuel. In 2012, a team of American doctors, hosted by Dau, restored eyesight to more than 286 patients, representing Dinka, Nuer, and Murle communities, in a concerted effort to foster peace through shared care.

Dau has also worked as a public speaker and advocate. He has addressed audiences at universities and public forums, including presentations at Bismarck State College in 2015, where he shared reflections on survival and resilience as one of Sudan’s "Lost Boys".
