= Panther Bior =

Lost Boy of Sudan

Panther G. Bior
- Born: 1981 (age 44–45); Bor, Sudan (now South Sudan)
- Citizenship: American
- Education: Point Park University

Panther Garang Bior is one of the 27,000 Lost Boys of Sudan. His journey was featured in the National Geographic Society's 2006 award-winning documentary, God Grew Tired of Us (executive produced by Brad Pitt and narrated by Nicole Kidman).

== Biography ==
Panther was born in the village of Mareng in Bor, Sudan (now in South Sudan) in 1981. In the late 1980s, Panther was far from his home watching cattle when his village was attacked by the Muslim Sudanese Government. Escaping to the jungle, Bior, along with the other Lost Boys, spent the next five years trekking more than 1,000 miles barefoot throughout Kenya and Ethiopia, seeking refuge from the genocide, disease, and starvation. In an interview with the Pittsburgh Tribune-Review, Panther described the hellish journey, "We were told to run east, through the desert, to Ethiopia," he says. "We were surviving by drinking the muddy water, and from the backs of leaves and whatever fruit we could find, maybe a little bit of grass. Many people lost their lives." Panther went on to describe how his best friend had been killed by a lion and his young nephew did not survive the journey because his feet were torn up by the miles of walking, "We had to leave him in the desert," Bior says. "He died."

Finally arriving at Kakuma's refugee camp in Kenya, the Lost Boys' numbers had been dramatically decreased. In 2001, assisted by Catholic Charities, Panther was relocated to Pittsburgh, Pennsylvania along with a number of other Lost Boys to start a new life in the United States.

== Today ==
Since first setting foot on American soil, Panther Bior has been arduously working to get established in a new culture while struggling with a myriad of mixed emotions: Interviewed in the Pittsburgh Catholic, Panther said, "It gives one hope. Now we are in America. But we think of when we were in the desert, with no clothes. I flash back to how my brothers missed the chance to come to America...I have tears of joy and tears of sorrow," he said.

In 2005, Panther traveled back to Africa to marry his girlfriend, Nyanthiec. After the wedding, he returned to the United States to fill out the necessary paperwork and begin the financial struggles of bringing his wife to the U.S. Three years later, he brought her back to the United States. Bior is currently living with his wife and two children in Pittsburgh. Graduating from Point Park University with a B.S. in Accounting, Panther is pursuing his master's degree in Organizational Leadership. Bior worked for the Bank of New York Mellon (BNYM) as an accounting analyst. Panther currently works at the Federal Home Loan Bank of Pittsburgh.

As featured in the "Take Action" section of God Grew Tired of Us, Bior is intent upon building a school in his home village of Mareng. In the Pittsburgh Post-Gazette, Panther is quoted as saying, "We need connections, just like the connections that brought us over from Africa." With such connections and now armed with a solid education, Panther has high hopes for the future of his homeland. "My country’s rich, got a lot of oil, got a lot of gold. But our people don’t know how to exploit them. So I have to come there, build a school, tell people the direction. And I can tell there’s--there’s improvement I’m bringing in the world." Panther is partnering with Heaven's Family, an international ministry based out of Pittsburgh, in an effort to build a school in his homeland.
