= Farm Forward =

American non-profit organization

Farm Forward is a 501(c)(3) nonprofit whose mission is to promote conscientious eating, reduce farmed animal suffering, and advance sustainable agriculture. Farm Forward aims to eliminate the most harmful practices in intensive animal agriculture, increase the market share of humane and sustainable animal agriculture, and raise awareness about the cultural significance of animal agriculture.

== Programs ==
=== Eating Animals ===
Eating Animals is a nonfiction book promoted by Farm Forward and written by American author Jonathan Safran Foer, who serves as a member on Farm Forward's board of directors. The book was written in close collaboration with Farm Forward CEO Dr. Aaron Gross, an associate professor of Theology and Religious studies at the University of San Diego, as well as Ben Goldsmith, Senior Strategist at Farm Forward.

Eating Animals presents a discussion of what it means to eat animal products in an industrialized world where intensive animal agriculture, also known as factory farming, has become the norm. Framed as Foer's personal journey to decide whether his newly born son should eat meat or not, the book explores themes surrounding the complexities of food ethics, the role of food in the shaping of personal identity, and the philosophical implications of eating animals. More specifically, it explores these themes as they relate to factory farming. A Los Angeles Times article states that the book provides "the kind of wisdom that... deserves a place at the table with our greatest philosophers." In a Huffington Post article, Natalie Portman cites the book as the source for her change "from a twenty-year vegetarian to a vegan activist." A New York Magazine article criticizes the book as irritatingly inconclusive, as Foer "settles on the safest possible non-conclusion: vegetarianism is probably the best option."

Farm Forward helped adapt the book into the documentary Eating Animals (2018), directed by Christopher Quinn and produced and narrated by Jonathan Safran Foer and Natalie Portman. According to Newsweek, Natalie Portman worked on the film “in collaboration with the director Christopher Dillon Quinn and nonprofit Farm Forward.” Additionally, Farm Forward CEO Aaron Gross served as a screenwriter for the film. Like the book, the film explores the consequences of factory farming and its relation to animal rights, human rights, environmentalism, and the intersections between all three.

=== Leadership Circle ===
The Leadership Circle program consults with large institutions, including universities, hospitals and businesses, to help them source animal products with third-party higher welfare certifications. Members can join the Leadership Circle if they agree to source 100% of at least one animal protein from select third-party welfare certifications. In February 2018, Farm Forward received a grant to continue to support the work of the Leadership Circle. Leadership Circle members include Bon Appetit Management Company, Airbnb, Dr. Bronner's, Hazon, UC Berkeley and Villanova University.

== Animal Welfare Certification ==
=== Buying Poultry ===
Buying Poultry is a program that aims to bring transparency from the poultry industry to its consumers. The New York Times quotes Farm Forward Executive Director Andrew Decoriolis, encapsulating the reason behind Farm Forward's Buying Poultry program: “Not all [animal welfare] certification seals are created equal... Companies can essentially pick the standards that are the easiest for them to meet.” To pose a solution to this problem, Farm Forward launched Buying Poultry in 2013, a program funded by a kick-starter campaign and a grant by the ASPCA. Buying Poultry is a national database that lists poultry products with their welfare labels or certifications. The website describes what these labels mean in terms of animal welfare in order to inform consumers about their poultry purchases. The database also provides grades for poultry products—ranging from A to F—in accordance with their labels and certifications. The primary aim of Buying Poultry is to increase the market share of higher welfare products.

Among higher welfare certifications for poultry raised for meat, Farm Forward views the heritage label as the most important in terms of animal welfare. A heritage bird, according to the Livestock Conservancy, must be recognized as an American Poultry Association Standard breed, be able to mate naturally, live a long, productive, and pasture based life, and have a moderate to slow growth rate. Farm Forward and Buying Poultry work to maintain a clear and robust definition of heritage poultry—one that precludes the possibility of any industry loopholes. The primary concern for poultry welfare in today's farming industry lies in the genetics of the birds, as modern breeding techniques often lead to suffering for chickens.

Farm Forward aims to create a legal definition of heritage poultry in order to prevent the term from being used loosely for breeds that do not meet the genetic requirements. According to Andrew Decoriolis, “heritage breeds are the only breeds we think can truly be separated from the factory farmed industry,” and creating a certification for the term “will give us some legal protection to police the term.”

=== Global Animal Partnership ===
Farm Forward CEO Dr. Aaron Gross serves on the board of Global Animal Partnership (GAP), a nonprofit launched in 2008 with the aim of improving farm animal welfare. The organization administers a 5-Step Animal Welfare Rating Standards program meant to encourage producers to gradually increase animal welfare measures in their operations. The program rates welfare on a scale of 1 to 5+ in accordance with certain criteria. The standards were created by a team of scientists, animal advocates, farmers and certifiers. Farms that enroll in the GAP program are audited by a third-party agency to ensure adherence to regulations without any conflicts of interest. The overarching goal of GAP is to increase enrollment in the program, and raise consumer awareness about the importance of animal welfare.

The GAP Program has received criticism from the animal agriculture industry. According to Drovers, a beef industry magazine, GAP is controlled largely by the HSUS, Farm Forward, ASPCA and CIWF whose ultimate goal is to gain control over production standards and practices. The article advises avoiding GAP Standards and directing consumers toward other certifications. Another criticism comes from a Beef Magazine article which states that GAP standards seem to have been made by someone who “grew up without much, if any, contact with animals.” Additionally, the article views the GAP standards prohibition against antibiotics or other drugs as outside of the domain of animal welfare, calling it instead an “elitist issue” serving consumers who can afford more expensive meat.

== Religious outreach ==
=== Jewish Initiative for Animals ===
Farm Forward launched the Jewish Initiative for Animals (JIFA) in January 2016 with the aim of educating Jewish communities on the ethics of animal agriculture and encouraging Jewish institutions to promote the importance of animal welfare in Jewish values. According to JIFA's mission statement, JIFA “supports innovative programs to turn the Jewish value of compassion for animals into action while building ethical and sustainable Jewish American communities in the process.”

JIFA collaborates with Jewish nonprofit organizations such as camps, synagogues, youth groups, community centers, schools, college programs and others to produce educational resources that spark inquiry into how Jewish values should interact with how we treat animals. JIFA also does consulting with institutions that serve animal products to assist them in lowering meat consumption and finding higher-welfare sources. JIFA's aim is to encourage Jewish institutions to develop ethical food policies that reflect animal welfare, or tzaar baalei chayim, as a core Jewish value.

JIFA aims to ensure that those who wish to keep a kosher diet and support higher welfare animal products are given the resources to do so. In November 2016 JIFA partnered with kosher meat distributors to bring the a run of kosher certified heritage breed chickens to market for the first time in approximately 50 years. Unlike conventional poultry, heritage breed chickens and turkeys are able to achieve highest possible welfare outcomes. JIFA also helped bring educational heritage flocks to Jewish educational and production farms, where educators teach about the impacts of factory farming in relation to Jewish values.

JIFA also opposes certified kosher products that it views as inhumane. In 2016, JIFA put out a call against the use of shackle and hoist slaughter by a number of certified kosher slaughterhouses. They called upon the groups implicated in such slaughter to end this practice, and to transition to upright slaughter. Additionally, JIFA called upon Israelis and members of Jewish communities to boycott these products, and encouraged Americans to voice their opposition to such practices. The ultimate goal of these calls are to end of the practice of shackle and hoist slaughter.

In May, 2017, Israel's agricultural ministry mandated an end to imports of beef products that involved shackle and hoist slaughter. In June, 2018 the Orthodox Union told its beef producers in South America to end its use of shackle and hoist slaughter.

=== Faith in Food ===
In 2015, Farm Forward launched the Faith in Food initiative. This initiative is meant to encourage religious leaders and institutions to explore the religious meaning and significance of factory farming. The initiative also encourages these leaders and institutions to create ethical food policies that address animal welfare in accordance with their specific faiths and values.

Farm Forward has recognized and supported Rev. Dr. Christopher Carter and Dr. David Clough as Faith in Food Fellows. Rev. Dr. Carter's work explores the intersectionality of factory farming and racial injustice, with this work being an expression of his faith. Dr. Clough received support from Farm Forward for his book On Animals: Volume 1: Systematic Theology. Clough also received support from Farm Forward to launch the CreatureKind project, a project that works within churches to help Christians address animal welfare in factory farming.
