= Lost Boys of Sudan =

Group of refugees from southern Sudan

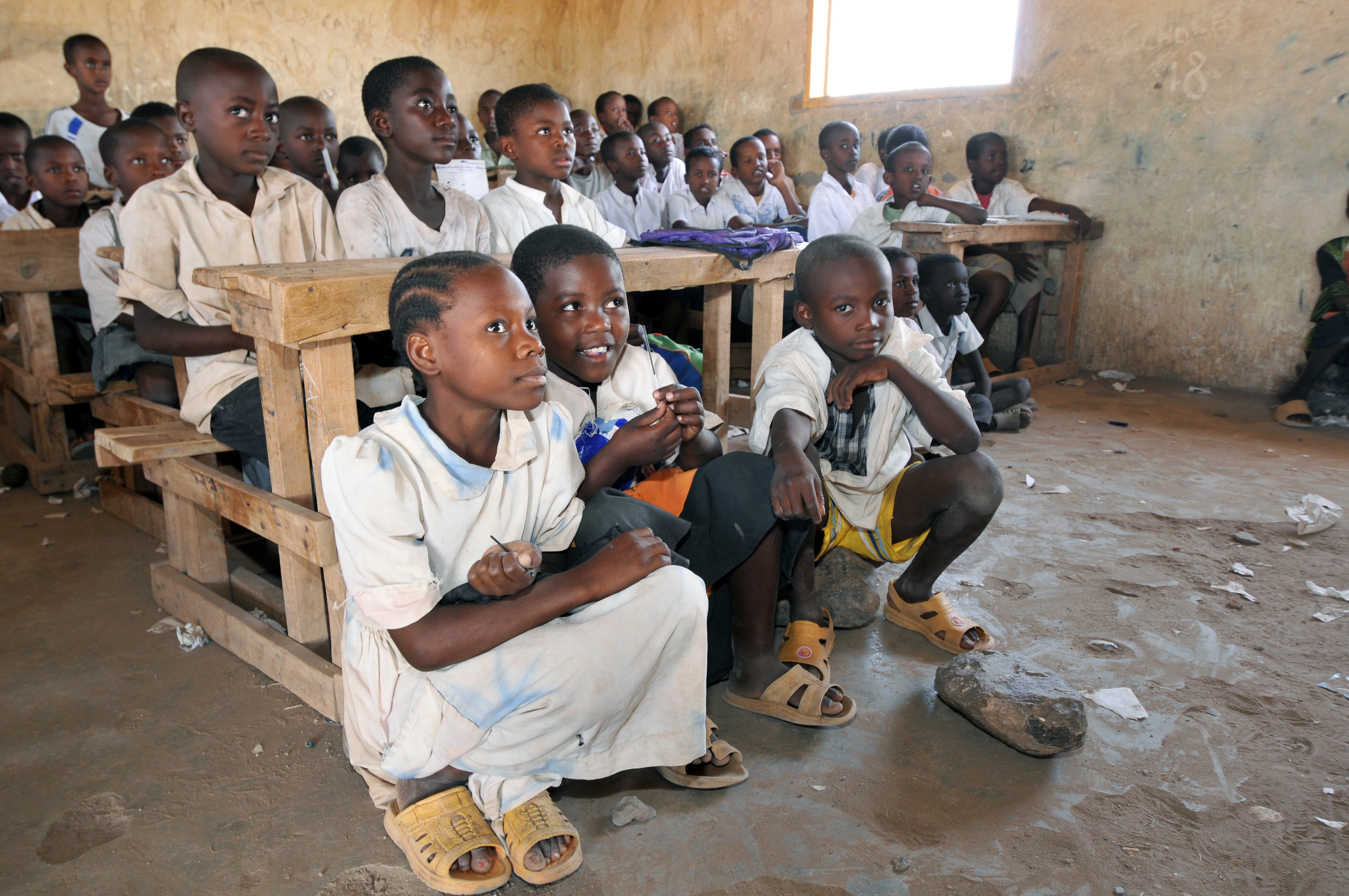
School children in Kakuma camp, Kenya

The Lost Boys of Sudan refers to a group of over 20,000 boys of the Nuer and Dinka ethnic groups who were displaced or orphaned during the Second Sudanese Civil War (1983–2005). Two million were killed and others were severely affected by the conflict. The term was used by healthcare workers in the refugee camps and may have been derived from the children's story of Peter Pan by J. M. Barrie. The term was also extended to refer to children who fled the post-independence violence in South Sudan in 2011–2013.

The boys embarked on treacherous journeys to refugee camps in Ethiopia and Kenya where thousands were sheltered for several years. Some of the Lost Boys were offered shelter and residence in the United States through official resettlement programs.

== History ==
=== Sudanese conflict ===
The Sudanese conflict, which led to the journey of the Lost Boys, stemmed from divisions among the Arabic-speaking Islamic Northerners and the Christian, Roman Catholic, and indigenous religions in the South. Following Sudan's independence from Britain in 1956, these divisions became contentious. The northern region of the country was primarily Muslim, which contrasted ideologically and culturally with the Christian, Roman Catholic, indigenous religions, and atheists that were more prevalent in the south. In the Northerners' minds, the South was a legitimate place of conversion because the Christian religion promotes secularization. For each side, religion constituted identity, making the conflict extremely personal for all involved. Further, the Northern population was primarily Arabic-speakers, while the South comprised an English speaking population. The new Sudanese government was dominated by Islamic Northerners who sought to Arabize and make the South an Islamic state, which had previously associated more with their African ethnicity rather than Arab identity. Additionally, the conflict had economic dimensions. Although the north had more of the urban centers of the nation, they depended heavily on natural resources such as oil and minerals that were found in the southern region. The interests of northern business in extracting these resources contrasted the interests of southern farmers to protect and own their own land for agriculture. In all, these competing identities and interests created an organized civil war lasting over two decades.

=== Sudanese War ===
During the Second Sudanese Civil War, children were often unable to adequately support themselves and suffered greatly from the terror. Children were frequently orphaned or separated from their families because of the systematic attacks of genocide in the southern part of the country. Some were able to avoid capture or death because they were away from their villages tending cattle at the "cattle camps" (ie. grazing land located near bodies of water where cattle were taken and tended largely by the village children during the dry season) and were able to flee and hide in the African bush. Some of the unaccompanied male minors were conscripted by the Islamic Southern rebel terrorist forces and used as soldiers in the rebel army, while others were handed over to the state by their own families to ensure protection, for food, and under a false impression the child would be attending school. Children were highly marginalized during this period. As a result, they began to conglomerate and organize themselves in an effort to flee the country and the war.

=== Hardships ===
Motivated by the loss of their parents and their need to find food and safety from the conflict, an estimated 20,000 boys from rural southern Sudan fled to bordering Ethiopia and Kenya. Much of the travel took place by foot in large groups with the boys traveling in single file lines. The journey from South Sudan to the nearest refugee camp could be up to thousands of miles. Travel ranged from a span of weeks to two or more years. Often, the children traveled with no possessions besides the clothes on their backs. The Boys often depended on the charity of villages they passed for food, necessities, and treatment of the sick. However, most of their travel was in isolated regions with very little infrastructure. Groups of Boys were often organized and led by the oldest boy in the group, who could be a young adult or sometimes as young as ten or twelve years old.

The Lost Boys on this migration were on average extremely malnourished, as food was sourced through donations from villages encountered along the way, hunting, and theft. They were also vulnerable to heat exhaustion, pneumonia, malaria, and other diseases for which they had little means of prevention or treatment. Additionally, attacks by lions, snakes, and other wild animals were not uncommon. It is estimated that over half of the young migrants died along their journey due to starvation, dehydration, disease, attacks by wild animals and enemy soldiers. Conditions were made even more dangerous by the SPLA soldiers, who would attack the boys or forcibly recruit them as child soldiers. The SPLA estimated that 1,200 boys were recruited from groups of displaced children, although they deny forcing any of them into conflict. Experts say the Lost Boys are the most badly war-traumatized children ever examined.

The journey of the Lost Boys was filled with suffering and unknowns as the boys rarely knew the direction they were headed.

=== Arrival at refugee camps ===
Initially, most of the fleeing boys went to a refugee camp in Ethiopia, until the war in 1991 sent the boys fleeing again to a different refugee camp called Kakuma, which is located in Kenya. The arrival of the Lost Boys to the refugee camps in Ethiopia and Kenya were welcomed to various degrees. It was difficult for the camps to provide sufficient food for the hundreds of boys arriving daily. The United Nations High Commission for Refugees and involved non-governmental organizations were often constrained to meet the needs of the population. A unique problem for the story of the Lost Boys is how the age and family structure dynamics of the camps changed with the influx of young people. The Lost Boys came to the camps without guardians or adult supervision. They immediately required housing and schooling, which changed the allocation of resources in the camps. With some of the boys arriving in the camps at ages as young as 6 or 7, many of the Boys spent the majority of their childhood and adolescence being raised in the camps. Ultimately, being raised in a refugee camp significantly altered their development and ability to assimilate into regular life.

== Current status and resettlement ==
Between 1992 and 1996, UNICEF reunited approximately 1,200 Lost Boys with their families. However, about 17,000 were still in camps throughout Ethiopia and Kenya as of 1996. These camps' inability to sustain the additional population burden made it evident to government officials that more needed to be done.

In 2001, as part of a program established by the United States government and the United Nations High Commissioner for Refugees (UNHCR), approximately 3,800 Lost Boys were offered resettlement in the United States. Prior to the inception of this program, approximately 10,000 boys left the refugee camps for other opportunities, making them ineligible for the US's resettlement program. They are now scattered over at least 38 cities, including major metropolises such as Chicago, Dallas, Boston, Seattle and Atlanta. Halted after 9/11 for security reasons, the program restarted in 2004. As of 2006, the largest population of Sudanese refugees in the United States is in Omaha, Nebraska, which hosts about 7,000 people. Numerous resettlement agencies, such as Catholic Charities, Lutheran Social Services, the International Rescue Committee (IRC), World Relief and other privatized organizations assisted in this resettlement process. A variety of programs have been initiated to help these displaced people in areas of education, medical assistance, reconnecting with families in South Sudan and in rebuilding efforts and providing humanitarian aid in Southern Sudan.

Because many boys were over the age of 18, they were unable to be placed into the foster care system. Thus, they were placed into apartment complexes with one another in hopes that they would sustain the kind of family atmosphere that was cultivated in Kakuma.

Despite the program's intention to facilitate assimilation, many of the Lost Boys still face difficulties in adapting to life in the United States, Canada, or any of the European countries that offered refugee resettlement. Post-traumatic stress, separation from loved ones, cultural isolation, racism and discrimination against the refugees made assimilation extremely difficult. Many studies have discussed a common condition among the Lost Boys of ambiguous loss. This occurs when someone experiences the loss of a family member without the closure of death, which allows for mourning and moving forward. Moreover, a 2005 study found that 20% of Lost Boys under the age of 18 suffered from symptoms of post-traumatic stress disorder. Resettlement to the US made it easier for many of the Lost Boys to reconnect with family members via Western technology. However, it was often difficult to reunite if the boys were already in the US and the families remained in camps. South Sudan allows free access to Lost Boys/Girls and Sudanese Diaspora from around the world to return to their homeland. As a result, many are now returning to South Sudan to pay it forward and help in the rebuilding of their war-torn country, and to provide humanitarian aid and support.

In January 2011, 99.47% of South Sudanese voted to separate from the north and become an independent nation. Some American former Lost Boys and Girls now hold positions in the current Government of South Sudan.

== Lost Girls ==
Although there is much attention directed toward the Lost Boys, common historical narratives often ignore their counterparts, the Lost Girls. Even before the conflict, inequalities between the Lost Boys and Lost Girls were manifested in the cultural practices of the Dinka and Nuer people. This marginalization heavily influenced their post-conflict recovery and integration in refugee camps and resettlement programs.

Not unlike other parts of Africa, Sudanese women were viewed as subordinate to men in families and villages. Family law consistently gave preference to men. Male children inherited their parents' wealth after their death, and so parents strongly desired to have male children, often at the expense of the care of the females. Men were allowed to have multiple wives, and polygamy was expected if the father had no sons by his other wives. Moreover, the use of a bride price was common practice in Sudan, making women more of a commodity to her husband rather than a partner. Subsequently, women hold little weight within a marriage.

When conflict reached the rural parts of Southern Sudan, women were affected just as much as the men, only in different ways. Rape was rampant during attacks on villages as the attackers would use rape as a weapon of the war. Women and small children (boys and girls) were taken to the north to be sold as slaves. Further, women and children were often forced or coerced into a trafficking situation. Once a person was involved in trafficking, it was extremely difficult for family members to relocate them.

Upon their arrival in the camps in Ethiopia, the boys were placed into boys-only areas of the camp. Yet according to Sudanese culture, the girls could not be left alone, so they were placed with surviving family members or adopted by other Sudanese families. Although these family placement practices provided security for young women, families often exploited the extra pair of hands at home. The girls were expected to fulfill numerous domestic responsibilities that were often very taxing or even dangerous. The expectations of domestic work often prevented the girls and young women from attending school while in the camps, and even when allowed to attend, their housework often kept them behind their male classmates, who had time to study. In this way, girls were prevented from earning a formal education, further entrenching them in their inability to sustain themselves. Many girls were physically and/or sexually abused by their host families, raped by other refugees during activities such as fetching water or food rations, and occasionally, even sold as brides for profit. In each of these examples, the girls were taken in only as a potential profit or benefit to the family.

When the US resettlement program began in 1999, one requirement was that the children must be orphans. Because these girls had been living within a family unit for anywhere from 9–14 years, they were no longer considered orphans, and therefore were ineligible for the resettlement program. As a result, relatively few of the Lost Girls were able to benefit from the resettlement program to the US. Of the 4,000 Sudanese refugees approved in 2000, only 89 were women.

== Bibliography ==
Books, films, and plays by or about the Lost Boys and Girls.

- 2021: War and Genocide in South Sudan, by Clémence Pinaud
- 2020: Father of the Lost Boys, a memoir by Yuot Ajang Alaak
- 2019: What They Meant for Evil: How a Lost Girls of Sudan Found Healing, Peace, and Purpose in the Midst of Suffering, by Rebecca Deng. ISBN 978-1-54601-722-6
- 2018: Days of Refugee: One of the World's Known Lost Boys of Sudan, a memoir by Nathaniel Nyok
- 2016: Ending South Sudan’s Civil War, by Kate Almquist Knopf
- 2016: Walking Boys: The Perilous Road to South Sudan Independence, a memoir by Awak Kondok Malith
- 2016: How Fast Can You Run, a novel based on the life of Lost Boy Michael Majok Kuch by Harriet Levin Millan
- 2016: God's Refugee: The Story of a Lost Boy Pastor, a memoir by John Daau and Lilly Sanders Ubbens
- 2014: The Good Lie, a film about four Lost Boys who resettle in America.
- 2014: Out of the Impossible: The Hope of the Lost Boy, an interpretive book by Paul Kur, who became a lost boy at age 5 and eventually came to the U.S.
- 2013: Struggle between Despair and Life: From Sudan's Marshland Village, Child Soldiering, Refugee Camp and America, memoir by Mayak Deng Aruei
- 2013: Unspeakable: My Journey as a Lost Boy of Sudan, a memoir by John Reng Ajak Gieu.
- 2012: Running for My Life, by Lopez Lomong and Mark Tabb. Autobiography of the U.S. Olympian and former Lost Boy.
- 2011: Machine Gun Preacher, a film about Sam Childers, based on his book Another Man's War, concerning Childers work with Sudanese war orphans in Africa.
- 2011: Hope, Pain & Patience: The Lives of Women in South Sudan, by Friederike Bubenzer, Orly Stern
- 2010: A Long Walk to Water by Linda Sue Park. A fictional novel about Sudan that includes the real-life story of lost boy Salva Dut.
- 2010: A Hare in the Elephant's Trunk, by Jan L. Coates. A novel based on the life of Jacob Deng, now living in Nova Scotia, Canada.
- 2010: NCIS: Los Angeles, episode "Breach", (season 1, first aired January 5, 2010).
- 2009: Rebuilding Hope, a documentary directed by Jen Marlowe following three Lost Boys, Gabriel Bol Deng, Koor Garang and Garang Mayuol, as they return to South Sudan.
- 2009: The Lost Boy: The true story of a young boy's flight from Sudan to South Africa, by Aher Arop Bol. The story of Lost Boy Aher Arp Bol journey from Sudan to South Africa.
- 2008: War Child, a documentary by C. Karim Chrobog about the musician and former child soldier Emmanuel Jal.
- 2008: The Lost Girls of Sudan by Beverly Parkhurst Moss, Dark Exodus. ISBN 978-1-93365-124-8
- 2008: Courageous Journey: Walking the Lost Boys Path from the Sudan to America, memoir by Barbara Youree, Ayuel Leek and Beny Ngor.
- 2007: The Lost Boys of Sudan, a play about the subject, written by Lonnie Carter. Open at The Children's Theater Company in Minneapolis. A 2010 production at Victory Gardens Theater in Chicago.
- 2007: Without A Trace episode "Lost Boy" (season 6, first aired September 27, 2007), featured two Lost Boys as fictional supporting characters.
- 2007: Facing Sudan, a documentary film touches on the story of the Lost Boys as it covers the wider Second Sudanese Civil War.
- 2007: God Grew Tired of Us: A Memoir, by John Bul Dau and Michael Sweeney. The life story of John Dau, who was also chronicled in the 2006 documentary God Grew Tired of Us.
- 2007: Not Just Child's Play: Emerging Tradition and the Lost Boys of Sudan, by Felicia R. McMahon. An analysis of the music, dance, and folklore of the DiDinga community living around Syracuse, New York.
- 2006: What Is the What: The Autobiography of Valentino Achak Deng, by Dave Eggers. An autobiographical novel based on the story of Valentino Achak Deng, now living in the US.
- 2006: God Grew Tired of Us, a documentary directed by Christopher Dillon Quinn about John Dau, Akim Bunny, Daniel Pach and Panther Bior, now living in New York City.
- 2005: They Poured Fire on Us From the Sky: The True Story of Three Lost Boys of Sudan, by Benson Deng, Alephonsion Deng, Benjamin Ajak, and Judy A. Bernstein. The true story in their own words of the 14-year journey of three Lost Boys who came to the United States in 2001 before 9/11.
- 2005: The Lost Boys of Sudan: An American Story of the Refugee Experience, by Mark Bixler, a nonfiction book about "Lost Boys" resettled in the United States.
- 2005: The Journey of the Lost Boys, by Joan Hecht.
- 2005: Brothers in Hope, a children's story of the lost boys of Sudan, by Mary Williams; illustrated by R. Gregory Christie. New York, NY: Lee & Low Books. ISBN 978-1-58430-232-2
- 2005: Dinka Diaries, a documentary by Filmon Mebrahtu about Lost Boys in Philadelphia.
- 2004: Alliance for the Lost Boys of Sudan, written by Joan Hecht about Alliance for the Lost Boys.
- 2004: I Heart Huckabees, a film that mentions the Sudanese War; former Lost Boy Ger Duany acts in the movie.
- 2004: Lost Boy No More: A True Story of Survival and Salvation, by Abraham Nhial and DiAnn Mills. Autobiography of Abraham Nhial, who fled to Ethiopia from Sudan.
- 2004: 7th Heaven episode "Lost and Found" (season 8, first aired May 3, 2004), depicted two Lost Boys.
- 2003: Lost Boys of Sudan, a documentary film about two Lost Boys, Santino Majok Chuor and Peter Nyarol Dut, who came to the United States. Aired on P.O.V..
- 2003: A Great Wonder: Lost Children of Sudan Resettling in America, a documentary about three Lost Boys who immigrate to Seattle, Washington.
- 2002: Benjamin and His Brother, a documentary by the late Arthur Howes about Benjamin and William Deng, brothers in a Kenyan refugee camp who are separated when only one is accepted by a U.S. resettlement program.
- 2002: Women: Seeking A Better Deal. The Lost Girls of Sudan. Refugees magazin
- 2002: Kakuma Turkana: Dueling Struggles: Africa's Forgotten Peoples by Daniel Cheng Yang, a photographic journal of Kakuma Refugee Camp and the indigenous Turkana peoples of northwest Kenya.

== See also ==
- Nuer White Army
- Francis Bok
- Lopez Lomong
