= Space Warriors (2013 film) =

- Film poster
- Screenplay by: Jeff Philips; Sean McNamara; Ronald Bass; Stan Chervin; Jim Strain
- Story by: Jeff Philips; Sean McNamara; Ronald Bass; Stan Chervin; Jim Strain
- Directed by: Sean McNamara
- Starring: Thomas Horn; Mira Sorvino; Dermot Mulroney; Josh Lucas; Danny Glover; Ryan Simpkins
- Narrated by: Drake Bell
- Theme music composer: Larry Brown

Production
- Producer: Jason Netter
- Cinematography: Robert Hayes
- Editor: Jeff Canavan
- Production companies: ARC Entertainment; Walden Media; Meteor 17; Brookwell McNamara Entertainment; P&G Productions

Original release
- Network: Hallmark Channel
- Release: May 31, 2013

Related
- Return to Nim's Island; Pete's Christmas

Space Warriors is a 2013 American film directed by Sean McNamara and starring Thomas Horn, Josh Lucas, and Danny Glover. The film was released in the United States on May 31, 2013.

== Plot ==
Jimmy Hawkins is a young boy who dreams of becoming an astronaut, just like his father, Andy. The movie begins with a narration from Jimmy, telling his story of why he wants to go into space and be an astronaut. His dream comes true when he wins a scholarship to Space Camp led by Commander Philips given by Col. Roy Manley, who travels around the world recruiting young cadets. However, Jimmy's mother, Sally, refuses because of an incident at NASA, when Andy was fired over a big fight. Jimmy fakes a voice recorder to make it sound like his father has let him go to space camp, then lies to his mother that he is going on a fishing trip with Andy.

When he arrives at Space Camp, he becomes a member of Warriors. The group includes Rusty the mechanic, Bao Yuen, the rocket scientist; Dani, the robotic engineer; Sergi, the computer whiz; and Lacey Myers, the pilot. Together, they compete against the Titans, led by Hunter, the winning team to go up to the space station the following year. The games are to test their skills. During Jimmy's stay at the camp, he speaks with Andy about NASA and Andy reveals that Manley had him fired. Despite this, Andy gives Jimmy advice listening to others and learning humility. One night, while Jimmy is on a date with Lacey and camping out, Lacey says she knows about his lie. Lacey then tells him her secret, that she is actually 14 and lied on her application; she does not become 15 until tomorrow.

Meanwhile, in outer space, a Russian space station is struck by debris and begins to lose pressure. The crew head to the escape pod. However, the escape pod is designed to only carry three, so three are left behind. Houston Control is alerted about it and contacts NASA in Alabama. Things are going well for the Warriors as they are in second place until Col. Manley is told about Lacey's lie about her age, which has her expelled from Space Camp. Hunter, not wanting to lose the final competition, sabotages the Warrior's space buggy.

With Lacey expelled, the Warriors use their robotic dummy to help, but one of its wheels comes loose causing them to lose and the titans win. At Jimmy's house, Sally calls, but he does not answer, and she then calls Andy, During the call, they discover that Jimmy lied to them, believing Jimmy had run away and Sally feels bad for being hard on him. They then discover he went to Space Camp and go to pick him up. Back at camp, Conway and Chandra are remorseful for letting Hunter sabotage the Warriors' buggy and decide to tell Col. Manley that Hunter cheated. Manley confronts him for cheating and expels Hunter from camp. Jimmy is then called in, discovers his parents at the camp and furious at him for lying to them, which also gets Jimmy expelled.

Upon learning that the Russian astronauts are in trouble and losing air, Jimmy and Lacey go to tell Col. Manley, despite both being expelled. He decides to let them help. Despite disagrees, Col. Manley and Andy work together along with the warriors and the help of the other cadets. They were able to repair the station using roboastronauts. Despite Jimmy's heroics, he is grounded for 2 months each for lying to his parents. Col. Manley congratulates him for his bravery and heroics. It's revealed that he took a part-time job at the space camp. In the end, Jimmy throws a party with the rest of the campers.

== Cast ==
- Thomas Horn as Jimmy Hawkins
  - Drake Bell as the adult Jimmy/Narrator (voice)
- Mira Sorvino as Sally Hawkins
- Dermot Mulroney as Andy Hawkins
- Josh Lucas as Colonel Roy Manley
- Danny Glover as Commander Philips
- Michael Zhang as Bao Yuen
- Nicholas Lobue as Sergi
- Savannah Jayde as Dani
- Grayson Russell as Rusty
- Booboo Stewart as Conway
- Thomas Kasp as Hunter
- Sahana Srinivasan as Chandra

== Production ==
The film was announced in February 2013 as a part of the initial season of the Walden Family Theater on the Hallmark Channel to air as its second original film in May 2013. Space Warriors premiered on May 31, 2013.

== Reception ==
Common Sense Media rated it 3 out of 5 stars.
