= Here I Am (novel) =

2016 novel by Jonathan Safran Foer

- First edition, 2016
- Author: Jonathan Safran Foer
- Language: English
- Genre: Novel
- Publisher: Farrar, Straus and Giroux
- Publication date: September 6, 2016
- Publication place: United States
- Media type: Print
- Pages: 592 (first edition, hardback)
- ISBN: 978-0374280024 (first edition, hardback)
- Website: Here I Am

Here I Am is a 2016 novel by Jonathan Safran Foer. It depicts a series of events that impact members of a Jewish family living in Washington, D.C., which some reviewers suggest includes autobiographical elements of Foer’s life. Here I Am is the first new novel published by Foer in over ten years, and it is the first in Foer's three-book installment with Farrar, Straus and Giroux.

== Plot ==
Christian Lorentzen has described the plot as a blend of several different events, including "[a] divorce, a suicide, a bar mitzvah, an earthquake, an all-out Middle Eastern war, and the putting to sleep of a family dog". These plot elements are tied together through a central narrative about the ways in which these events impact the lives of a Jewish family living in Washington, D.C. Daniel Menaker notes that the "collage" of narratives overlap with one another at times, though they also sometimes conflict with each other. Jennifer Maloney has suggested that the novel contains several autobiographical elements. Constance Grady also cited similarities between Jacob Bloch, a character in the novel, and events in Foer's own life. When asked to describe the novel, author Jonathan Safran Foer said, "I would say it’s not my life but it’s me."

== Background ==
Here I Am is Foer's third novel, following Everything Is Illuminated (2002) and Extremely Loud and Incredibly Close (2005). It is the first in Foer's three-book installment with publisher Farrar, Straus and Giroux. The phrase "here I am" is derived from the biblical account of the words that were spoken by Abraham when he was asked to sacrifice his son, Isaac. Foer stated that he wrote two-thirds of Here I Am in the final year of his work on the novel. According to Time, Foer's work on the novel "went into high gear" after Foer decided to stop working on a planned television show for HBO called All Talk; the planned television show also would have focused on the life of a Jewish family in Washington, D.C. Foer explained that when he worked on the novel at his home, he would write on a laptop computer placed on his lap, and that he would move between rooms of his house whenever he began to experience "the inability to value [his] thoughts", an experience that Foer described as "Jonathan block".

== See also ==
- Tree of Codes
