= Society of Jewish Ethics =

Academic organization

The Society of Jewish Ethics is an academic organization which promotes scholarly work in the field of Jewish ethics.

== Journal of Jewish Ethics ==
The Society publishes a scholarly journal titled the Journal of Jewish Ethics. The founding editors of the journal were Louis E. Newman and Jonathan K. Crane. The current editors of the journal are Jonathan K. Crane and Emily Filler.

The editorial board has included Elliot N. Dorff, Robert B. Gibbs, Alyssa Gray, Martin Kavka, Jonathan Sacks, David Teutsch, Noam Zohar, Laurie Zoloth, Julia Watts Belser, Yonatan Brafman, Geoffrey Claussen, Aaron S. Gross, Jeffrey Israel, Michal Raucher, Danya Ruttenberg, Moses Pava, Suzanne Last Stone, and Jonathan Schofer.

== Presidents ==
Presidents of the Society have included:

- Aryeh Cohen, 2023-
- Michal Raucher, 2021-2023
- Joel Gereboff, 2019-2021
- Aaron S. Gross, 2017-2019
- Geoffrey Claussen, 2015-2017
- Jonathan K. Crane, 2013-2015
- Aaron L. Mackler, 2011-2013
- Toby Schonfeld, 2009-2011
- David Teutsch, 2007-2009
- Elliot N. Dorff, 2005-2007
- Louis E. Newman, 2003-2005 (founding president)

== Interreligious relations ==
The Society meets alongside the Society of Christian Ethics. There have sometimes been tensions between the two organizations, as when the Society of Christian Ethics invited Reverend Jeremiah Wright to speak in 2009, and Wright criticized Israel. The Society of Jewish Ethics board objected to Wright's claim that Israel was engaged in ethnic cleansing. Jewish theologian Marc Ellis criticized the Society of Jewish Ethics board for their objection to Wright's appearance and for their failure to criticize Israel during the 2009 Gaza War.
