= Christopher Dillon Quinn =

American film director

Christopher Dillon Quinn, also known as Christopher Quinn, is an American film director, writer, and producer. He was born in Washington, D.C. and grew up in neighboring Alexandria, Virginia. He studied Film and Visual Anthropology at the Anthropology Film Center in Santa Fe, New Mexico.

Quinn won the Audience Award and the Grand Jury Prize for his film God Grew Tired of Us at the 2006 Sundance Film Festival. God Grew Tired of Us went on to win Best Documentary at the Deauville Film Festival and Galway Film Festival. In 2007, Quinn was awarded the emerging documentary filmmaker award by the International Documentary Association. He also directed the feature-length film 21 Up America which was based on the seminal British series and produced by Michael Apted.

Quinn recently directed and wrote a documentary entitled “Eating Animals”, which explores the highly damaging effects of industrialized animal agriculture on animals, humans, and the planet. The film, narrated by Oscar-winning actress Natalie Portman, is based on the highly acclaimed nonfiction book of the same title written by Jonathan Safran Foer. The film had its world premiere on September 2, 2017, at Telluride Film Festival.
