= Thomas Horn (actor) =

American attorney and former actor

Thomas Horn (born 1997 or 1998) is an American actor. He played Oskar Schell in the 2011 film Extremely Loud & Incredibly Close. Horn won a Critics' Choice Award for Best Young Actor for his performance. He also played Jimmy Hawkins in Space Warriors. a 2013 television movie.

Horn was cast in Extremely Loud & Incredibly Close after film producer Scott Rudin discovered him on Jeopardy!, where Horn was a contestant. He was to appear opposite Kris Kristofferson in a film titled Joe's Mountain.

== Personal life ==
Horn is from Oakland, California. He was born to Erich Horn, an ophthalmic surgeon and Biljana Horn, a pediatric oncologist. He is of Croatian descent on his mother's side.

== Filmography ==
- Extremely Loud & Incredibly Close (2011)
- Space Warriors (TV movie) (2013)
- A Financial Engagement (Short film) (2016)
