= Extremely Loud & Incredibly Close =

2005 novel by Jonathan Safran Foer

- Author: Jonathan Safran Foer
- Cover artist: Jon Gray
- Language: English
- Genre: Novel
- Publisher: Houghton Mifflin
- Publication date: 1 April 2005 (1st edition)
- Publication place: United States
- Media type: Print (hardback & paperback)
- Pages: 368 pp (hardback & paperback editions)
- ISBN: 0-618-32970-6 (hardback edition)
- OCLC: 57319795
- Dewey Decimal: 813/.6 22
- LC Class: PS3606.O38 E97 2005

Extremely Loud & Incredibly Close is a 2005 novel by Jonathan Safran Foer. The book's narrator is a nine-year-old boy named Oskar Schell. In the story, Oskar discovers a key in a vase that belonged to his father, who died a year earlier in the September 11 attacks. The discovery inspires Oskar to search all around New York for information about the key and closure following his father's death.

== Synopsis ==
Oskar Schell is a nine-year-old boy whose father, Thomas Schell, died in the terrorist attacks on the World Trade Center on September 11, 2001. The novel begins after the tragedy, with Oskar narrating. Since his father's death, Oskar struggles with insomnia, panic attacks, and depression. He often describes the feeling of depression as wearing heavy boots, and deals with this by giving himself bruises. His relationship with his mother has also become strained, particularly as she has started dating a man named Ron, whom Oskar resents for having replaced his father.

One day, in his father's closet, Oskar finds a key in a small envelope inside a vase that he accidentally broke; in the keyshop he finds the name Black and thinks this has something to do with the key. Curious, Oskar sets out on a mission to contact every person in New York City with the last name of Black in the hope of finding the lock that belongs to the key his father left behind, creating a binder with mementos of his journey.

One of the first people Oskar meets is a 48-year-old woman named Abby Black. Oskar and Abby instantly become friends, but she has no information on the key. Oskar continues to search the city. Toward the end of his journey Oskar meets an old man he calls "the renter" because until the point of meeting, Oskar had only heard of the old man's existence from his grandmother who referred to him as the new tenant in her apartment. The reader learns towards the end of the book that "the renter" is actually Oskar's grandfather, who abandoned his grandmother while she was pregnant with Thomas, though Oskar does not realise the connection.

The book spans many months of Oskar's journey, some of which he is accompanied by his eccentric elderly neighbour, Mr. A. Black, and they develop a close friendship. After meeting with a woman named Ruth in the Empire State Building, who has a history of her own with the building, Mr. Black ends his travels with Oskar, who struggles with his departure. He tries to visit Mr. Black again later but finds out he has moved house, presumably to be with Ruth, and is selling his apartment, leaving behind a card for Oskar, reading "Oskar Schell: Son". Eight months after Oskar initially met Abby, he finds a message from her on the answering machine. Oskar had not touched that phone since his father died because his father's last words had been on an identical answering machine which Oskar had kept hidden from his mother. Oskar finds out that Abby called him directly after his visit, saying she was not completely honest with him and might be able to help. Oskar returns to Abby's apartment after listening to this message, and Abby directs him to her ex-husband, William Black.

When Oskar talks to William, he learns that the key once belonged to William's father. In his will, William's father left William a key to a safe-deposit box, but William had already sold the vase at the estate sale to Thomas Schell. Then, Oskar tells William something that he "never told anyone" – the story of the last answering machine message Oskar received from his father, during the attack of 9/11. Disappointed that the key does not belong to him, Oskar then gives William the key and goes home angry and sad, not interested in the contents of the box. Oskar also discovers that his mother knew about his activities the entire time and was contacting everyone with the name Black in New York City. After the first few visits she called every Black that he would meet and informed them that Oskar was going to visit and why. In response, the people Oskar met knew ahead of time why he was coming and usually treated him in a friendly manner.

Resolving to try to move on from his father's death, Oskar bonds with Ron after finding out that he met his mother at a support group after having lost his wife and daughter in a car accident. On the second anniversary of his father's death, Oskar meets with "the renter" and they go to dig up his father's grave. Contemplating on what to put into the empty coffin, "the renter" decides to bury various letters that he had written to his unborn son. Shortly after returning home, Oskar reconciles with his mother and vows to become better and allow for her to find happiness again, and she tells him how Oskar's father lied to her in his last call, telling her that he was coming home, to assure her not to worry over his death. Before going to bed, Oskar takes out his binder and proceeds to rearrange the pages in reverse in an attempt to relive the last few hours with his father and achieve closure.

The novel has a parallel narrative that eventually converges with the main story. This narrative is portrayed through a series of letters written by Oskar's grandfather to Oskar's father Thomas, and by Oskar's grandmother to Oskar himself. The letters written by Oskar's grandfather explain his past in World War II, his first love, and his marriage to Oskar's grandmother. The letters written by Oskar's grandmother explain her past in meeting Oskar's grandfather, the trouble in their relationship, and how important Oskar is to her. Upon learning of his son's death, Oskar's grandfather promptly returns to New York and tracks down Oskar and his grandmother. His grandmother decides to let him live with her in her apartment temporarily, which results in them becoming intimate, and he watches over Oskar from afar before meeting him. Shortly after burying the letters with Oskar, his grandfather returns to the airport where Oskar's grandmother follows him. After discussing the war, losing their loved ones and their marriage, they decide to stay in the airport for a while.

The final pages are a flip-book style animation of a photograph of a man falling from the World Trade Center, derived from a photograph by Lyle Owerko. The animation makes the man appear to fall upwards.

== Characters ==
- Oskar Schell is the nine-year-old protagonist of Extremely Loud & Incredibly Close. He is an eccentric, intelligent, and clever young boy who self-identifies as a number of things including inventor, amateur entomologist, origamist, and amateur archaeologist. He often contemplates deeper topics and shows great empathy beyond what the average 9-year-old might have. His thoughts have a tendency to trail off into far-flung ideas, such as ambulances that alert passersby to the severity of their passengers' conditions and plantlike skyscrapers, and he has several assorted hobbies and collections. He is very trusting of strangers and makes friends easily, though he does not have many friends his own age. In the film it is alluded that he has autism. Oskar mentions being taken in for testing in his first interaction with Abby Black, however he states that "...Tests weren't definitive."
- Oskar's mother, Linda Schell, referred to as "Mom" by Oskar in the book, cares for her family greatly. After Thomas's death, Linda tells Oskar "I won't fall in love again."[4] Though it is implied that she knows Oskar is running around the city meeting strangers, she nevertheless allows him to do so in order to discover more about his father.
- Oskar's grandmother is a kind woman who is very protective of Oskar. She calls out to him often, and Oskar always responds with "I'm okay" out of habit. When she arrived in the United States, she read as many magazines as she could to integrate herself into the culture and language. As Anna's (Oskar's grandfather's first love) younger sister, she enters into a tumultuous marriage with Oskar's grandfather, and the couple breaks up before the events of the novel.
- Mr A. Black is an elderly man who is one hundred and three years of age, who lives in the same apartment building as Oskar, and joins him for some of his journey. Prior to meeting Oskar, Mr. Black had not left his apartment in twenty-four years, after having had a rather adventurous life. He is nearly deaf, and cries after Oskar turns on his hearing aids after a "long time" where he was unable to hear.
- Oskar's grandfather, Thomas Schell Sr. (also referred to as "the renter") is an important character in the story, even though he does not physically meet Oskar until the book's end. After the death of his first love, Anna, Oskar's grandfather loses his voice completely and consequently tattoos the words "yes" and "no" on his hands. He carries around a "daybook" where he writes phrases he cannot speak aloud. He marries Anna's younger sister, Oskar's grandmother.
- Anna is an absent character. She is Oskar's grandfather's first love. Oskar's grandfather falls in love with her instantly. She dies in the Dresden firebombings of World War II after telling Oskar's grandfather of her pregnancy. She is Oskar's grandmother's sister.
- Abby Black is William Black's ex-wife. She is forty-eight years old and lives by herself. She is friendly and welcoming to Oskar when he arrives at her house, though she does decline Oskar's offer of a kiss.
- Oskar's father, Thomas Schell, dies before the events of the book begin, having been in One World Trade Center the day of the attacks. Oskar remembers him as caring, smelling of aftershave and always humming the song "I Am the Walrus" by The Beatles. Thomas Schell organizes several expeditions for Oskar, such as a game to find an object from every decade of the past century. These adventures with his father are one of the reasons Oskar begins his journey about the key.
- Stan is the doorman in the building Oskar lives in. He alerts Oskar when he has mail.
- Buckminster is Oskar's cat.

== Background ==
Jonathan Safran Foer's inspiration for his main character came when having difficulty with another project. In an interview, Foer stated: "I was working on another story and I just started to feel the drag of it. And so, as a side project, I got interested in the voice of this kid. I thought maybe it could be a story; maybe it would be nothing. I found myself spending more and more time on it and wanting to work on that". On the challenges of writing a novel in a child's voice, Foer responded, "It's not the voice of a child exactly", adding that "in order to create this thing that feels most real, it's usually not by actually giving the most accurate presentation of it."

Foer combined the character he had been developing with the 9/11-centered plot. He created the story line from his personal experiences and reactions regarding the terrorist attacks on 9/11. Foer was sleeping off jet lag after returning to New York City from a trip to Spain, when he was woken by a phone call from a friend: "He said, 'You have to turn on the TV, a plane has crashed into the World Trade Center.' And then he said, 'I think it's going to be a very strange day.'" In another interview, Foer said: "I think it's a greater risk not to write about [9/11]. If you're in my position—a New Yorker who felt the event very deeply and a writer who wants to write about things he feels deeply about—I think it's risky to avoid what's right in front of you."

== Themes ==
Major themes of Extremely Loud & Incredibly Close include trauma, mourning, family, and the struggle between self-destruction and self-preservation. Sien Uytterschout and Kristiaan Versluys have examined the specific types of trauma and recuperative measures that Oskar's grandmother and grandfather go through after the Dresden bombings and that Oskar goes through after the loss of his father. They argue that Oskar has a simultaneous death wish and extreme need for self-preservation: This theme is echoed in Thomas Schell, Sr.'s pronounced survivor guilt and Oskar's grandmother's well-disguised inability to cope with her trauma. They also argue that though Oskar's journey to "find" his father does not help him get over his traumatic experience, it does allow him to grow closer to his mother.

== Cultural impact ==
Authors began producing 9/11 novels as early as 2002 as a way of recognizing the tragedy. Jonathan Safran Foer's novel was one of many that confronted the aftermath of the attacks through the eyes of a New Yorker. However, 9/11 fiction is not only a new subgenre, but a new struggle for many authors. Richard Gray stated in his book on 9/11 literature After The Fall: "If there was one thing writers agreed about in response to 9/11, it was the failure of language; the terrorist attacks made the tools of their trade seem absurd." There was a desire to write about the experience, to recognize the individual impact, as well as the greater social impact, while appreciating the mourning of the country, but many authors found it difficult to do so.

Foer utilizes the child narrator in an attempt to connect with that struggle. The struggle of the child to understand the trauma is reflective of the struggle many faced after the trauma of the 9/11 attacks.

Foer's novel was one of the most popular and widely read novels of this post 9/11 fiction subgenre. Because of its great popularity, its message had a greater impact than many novels of its kind. Apart from the terrorist attacks of September 11, the novel also sheds light on the experience of terrible tragedy. Rebecca Miller of the Library Journal claims "Foer nimbly explores the misunderstandings that compound when grief silences its victims." The novel makes sense of and provides a way of moving on from the grief of the specific catastrophe. "Few works of literature have succeeded in drawing lasting meaning, whole or fragmentary, from modernity's string of catastrophes... but Extremely Loud & Incredibly Close is one of them, providing a tool to create understanding of grief and loss."

== Critical response ==
John Updike, writing for The New Yorker, found the novel to be "thinner, overextended, and sentimentally watery", compared to Foer's first novel. He stated: "The book's hyperactive visual surface covers up a certain hollow monotony in its verbal drama." In a review for The New York Times, Michiko Kakutani said: "While it contains moments of shattering emotion and stunning virtuosity that attest to Mr. Foer's myriad gifts as a writer, the novel as a whole feels simultaneously contrived and improvisatory, schematic and haphazard." Kakutani also stated the book was "cloying" and identified the unsympathetic main character as a major issue. The topic of the child narrator is a contentious one. Many critics found the child narrator to be unbelievable and not relatable.

Despite several unfavorable reviews, the novel was viewed positively by several critics. Foer's child narrator was featured in a critical article titled "Ten of the Best Child Narrators" by John Mullan of The Guardian in 2009. The Spectator stated that "Safran Foer is describing a suffering that spreads across continents and generations" and that the "book is a heartbreaker: tragic, funny, intensely moving". "Foer's excellent second novel vibrates with the details of a current tragedy but successfully explores the universal questions that trauma brings on its floodtide.... It's hard to believe that such an inherently sad story could be so entertaining, but Foer's writing lightens the load." Sam Munson, in a review of two novels on catastrophe claimed: "Foer has a natural gift for choosing subjects of great import and then pitching his distinctive voice sharply enough to be heard above their historical din."

== Reception ==
Extremely Loud & Incredibly Close received the following accolades:

- New York Public Library's "Books to Remember" list
- International Dublin Literary Award Shortlist (2007)
- The Morning News Tournament of Books (Quarterfinalist, 2006)
- The New York Times Bestseller (Fiction, 2005)
- Libraires du Québec (Lauréat Roman hors Québec, 2007)
- ALA Outstanding Books for the College Bound (Literature & Language Arts, 2009)
- ALA Notable Books for Adults (2006)
- Village Voice 25 Favorite Books (2005)
- V&A Illustration Award (2005)

Despite the above, the book has frequently been challenged. According to the American Library Association, it was one of the top one hundred banned and challenged books between 2010 and 2019.

== Film adaptation ==
A film adaptation of the novel was released on January 20, 2012. The script was written by Eric Roth, and Stephen Daldry directed. Tom Hanks, Sandra Bullock, John Goodman, Viola Davis, Max von Sydow and Jeffrey Wright starred, alongside 2010 Jeopardy! Kids Week winner Thomas Horn, 12, as Oskar Schell. The film was produced by Paramount Pictures and Warner Bros.

== See also ==
- List of cultural references to the September 11 attacks
- Here I Am
- House of Leaves

== Bibliography ==
- Foer, Jonathan Safran (2005). Extremely Loud & Incredibly Close. Houghton Mifflin. ISBN 978-0-618-71165-9.
