= Louis E. Newman =

American academic

- Spouse: Amy Eilberg (m. 1996)

Academic background
- Education: University of Minnesota, Brown University
- Website: Official website

Louis E. Newman is the John M. and Elizabeth W. Musser Professor of Religious Studies, emeritus at Carleton College in Northfield, Minnesota. From 2016-2022 he served as Associate Vice Provost for Undergraduate Education and Dean of Academic Advising at Stanford University.

Newman grew up in St. Paul, Minnesota. He received his B.A. in philosophy and Hebrew and his M.A. in philosophy from the University of Minnesota. He received his Ph.D. in Judaic Studies from Brown University in 1983. He was a professor at Carleton College from 1983 to 2016, during which time he also served as the Director of the Perlman Center for Learning and Teaching (2010-2013) and as an Associate Dean of the College (2013-2016).

Newman has been described by Rabbi Eugene Borowitz as "probably our leading contemporary critic of applied Jewish ethical method."

Newman is the author of numerous books including:

- Past Imperatives: Studies in the History and Theory of Jewish Ethics (SUNY Press, 1998)
- An Introduction to Jewish Ethics (Prentice Hall, 2005)
- Repentance: the Meaning and Practice of Teshuvah (Jewish Lights, 2010)
- Thinking Critically in College: The Essential Handbook for Student Success (Radius Book Group, 2023)

He has co-edited with Elliot N. Dorff both Contemporary Jewish Ethics and Morality (Oxford University Press, 1995) and Contemporary Jewish Theology (Oxford University Press, 1998), as well as three volumes in the Jewish Publication Society's "Jewish Voices, Jewish Choices" series.

An issue of the Journal of Jewish Ethics (vol. 10, 2024) was devoted to celebrating his contributions to the field of Jewish ethics.

Newman was the founding President of the Society of Jewish Ethics.

He also served as president of Beth Jacob Congregation in Mendota Heights, Minnesota from June 2009-June 2011.

He is married to Amy Eilberg, the first woman to be ordained as a rabbi in Conservative Judaism.
