= Dorothy Finkelhor =

American academic (1902–1988)

Dorothy Cimberg Finkelhor (February 22, 1902 – July 19, 1988) was an American academic, teacher, and speaker. She was the founder and first president of Point Park College in Pittsburgh.

Dorothy Cimberg was born in New York City’s Lower East Side, and her parents were Jewish immigrants from Russia. She and her husband, Lawrence H. Finkelhor (a.k.a. L. Herbert Finkelhor), founded the Business Training College in downtown Pittsburgh in 1933. It eventually became Point Park University. Dr. Finkelhor, a native of New York City, was president of the college until 1971.

== Death ==
Dorothy Finkelhor died on July 19, 1988, aged 86, at her home in Ocean Ridge, Florida. She was survived by her husband, three children and six grandchildren.
