= Eating Animals =

2009 book by Jonathan Safran Foer

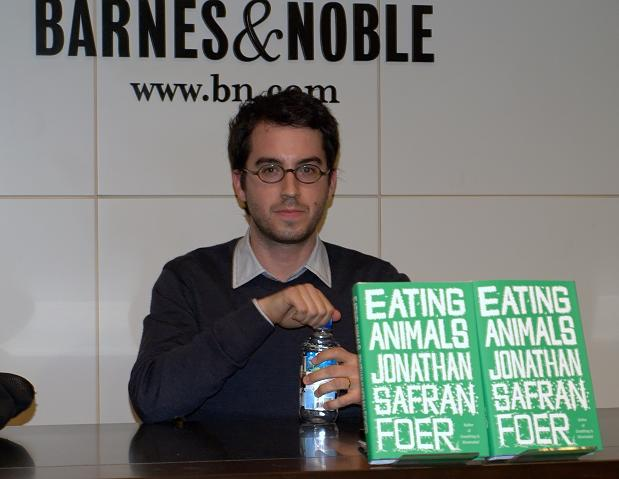
- Jonathan Safran Foer at Barnes & Noble Union Square to discuss his book Eating Animals
- Author: Jonathan Safran Foer
- Language: English
- Genre: Nonfiction
- Publisher: Little, Brown and Company
- Publication date: 2009
- Publication place: United States
- Pages: 352 pages (hardcover)
- ISBN: 978-0-316-06990-8
- LC Class: TX392 .F58 2009

Eating Animals is the third book by the American novelist Jonathan Safran Foer, published in 2009. A New York Times best-seller, Eating Animals provides a dense discussion of what it means to eat animals in an industrialized world. It was written in close collaboration with Farm Forward, a US nonprofit organization promoting veganism and sustainable agriculture.

The book was adapted and extended into a 2018 documentary film with the same name, directed by Christopher Dillon Quinn and co-narrated by Foer and Natalie Portman.

== Overview ==
Foer presents the book as a way for him to decide whether or not his newborn child should eat meat. Foer's son is representative of the generations that are entering a world of industrialized farming, in which the decision to eat meat has many more implications than taste. More often than not, putting meat on our plates comes with immense ramifications not only for the animals involved, but also for the environment, and ourselves; the animals suffer, the environment is damaged, and our health is put into question. Essentially, Foer concludes that the detriments of factory farms outweigh the benefits of taste, which is why he chooses to raise his son a vegetarian.

Throughout the book, Foer places significant emphasis on the stories that come with food. To strengthen the emphasis, both the first and the last chapters of the book are entitled “storytelling.” In the book, Foer states that “stories about food are stories about us―our history and our values,” and establishes storytelling as the overriding theme of the whole book. For Foer, storytelling is a way of recognizing and dealing with the complexity of the subject that is eating animals, and how it is connected to identity. The stories in our plates are the stories about our relationship with the world as represented by the people we eat with, the process by which our food reaches the table, what kinds of food find their ways to our table, etc. According to Foer, the way humans cope with and understand complex phenomena is by turning their occurrences into stories about what they mean. In this sense, the suggested profundity within the phenomenon of meat eating gives Foer's concept of storytelling a religious undertone.

As the title suggests, the particular phenomenon Foer focuses on is the consumption of meat. He discusses what eating meat has meant in the past, and what it means today. In doing so, he does not, as one might expect, make the claim that eating meat is intrinsically bad. Rather, he claims that eating meat is circumstantially bad; for example, it is bad when it entails the suffering of animals, environmental destruction, and/or a risk for human health. Today, according to the book and a number of its cited sources, eating meat overwhelmingly entails these problems, while in the past, it has not. The conclusion Foer reaches is that eating animals that come from industrial methods―such as factory farming, industrial fishing, and the like―is bad.

Foer notes that most people recognize there is something bad about eating animals, but that people willingly forget this is the case. Part of what is forgotten in this process, Foer argues, is a connection to our own animality. We neglect the parts of us that makes us similar to them―like, for example, the ability to feel or be relieved of pain―and we deny their importance in the constitution of our humanity. As Foer puts it, “what we forget about animals, we begin to forget about ourselves.” What this leads to, Foer argues, is a fairly ambiguous sense of shame―the feeling of shame that arises when memory reminds us of what we have willingly forgotten.

Forgetfulness, the book suggests, is reinforced and perpetuated by the lack of transparency in the meat industry. Farms are generally closed to the public, and it is so difficult to get inside of one that Foer illegally sneaks into one to write about the conditions of the typical factory farm. During his operation, he witnesses the dismal conditions in which the animals live, which helps him understand why the industry seeks confidentiality. He describes this experience as a direct contrast to the marketing tactics used by factory farms. In an attempt to shine light on the meaning of such marketing claims, Foer dedicates a whole chapter to definitions of words that connect humans and food. In it, he defines some of the labels and certifications that are assigned to animal products, suggesting that many of them are misleading.

Ultimately, Eating Animals discusses the ethics of food. It suggests that our food choices directly reflect the ethical values we stand for. When people eat meat, Foer claims, they are implying that satisfying their desire for meat is more important than letting animals live well, or even live at all. This can be a conscious or unconscious process, but its implications, for Foer, are always real. When one supports factory farming, one is relinquishing the importance of certain moral behavior to animals, and in turn, to humans as well. For example, if one denies the importance of the suffering of an animal, one denies the importance of the ability to suffer in and of itself, so it follows that one denies the importance of suffering for humans. In a similar chain of logic, Foer connects our treatment of animals to our treatment of humans―we dichotomize between those who matter and those who do not. Consequently, each food choice an individual makes is an ethical one that profoundly impacts both human and non-human animals.

== Critical reception ==
A New York Times best-seller, Eating Animals has received mixed reviews from critics. A Washington Post article describes Foer's book as providing a writing style that has "always divided his readers into love-him or hate-him camps."

Some critics praise both the conclusions Foer reaches and how he reaches them. A Los Angeles Times article states that Eating Animals contains "the kind of wisdom that... deserves a place at the table with our greatest philosophers." In a Huffington Post article, Natalie Portman wrote that the book was so powerful that she went from a twenty-year vegetarian to a vegan activist. According to a piece by the New Yorker, the power of the book lies in its ability to discuss why humans can be so loving to their companion animals while simultaneously being completely indifferent to the ones they eat.

Other critics have criticized the book. In a New York Magazine review, one vegetarian critic called the book "deeply irritating," as it "settles on the safest possible non-conclusion."

== Documentary ==
Documentary director Christopher Quinn and actress Natalie Portman produced a documentary version of Eating Animals in 2018. Like the book, the documentary explores the ethics of contemporary animal agriculture. The creators hope to expand the reach of Eating Animals' message so that more people think of the meat they eat in new ways. The film was released in cinemas on June 15, 2018. On Rotten Tomatoes, the film holds an approval rating of 91% based on 46 reviews, with an average rating of 7.00/10. The site's critics consensus reads: "Eating Animals' thoughtful analysis and exploration of corporate farming is impressive, given the scope of the topic." At Metacritic, the film has a weighted average score of 69 out of 100, based on 14 critics, indicating "generally favorable reviews".

== See also ==
- List of vegan and plant-based media
