= Anthropology Film Center =

American filmmaking school

Anthropology Film Center was a documentary filmmaking school at 1626 Canyon Road, Santa Fe, New Mexico. It was at one time the only school in the United States that focused on ethnographic films.

Carroll and Joan Williams founded the school in 1965 to facilitate communication, training and research among anthropologists. The school offered semester long programs of study on documentary filmmaking as well shorter workshop. The class size was between 10–20 students.
