= Alliance for the Lost Boys of Sudan =

The Alliance for the Lost Boys of Sudan is a 501(c)(3) all-volunteer foundation in Jacksonville, Florida, established in 2004, to meet the health and educational needs of Lost Boys and their siblings living in Africa and the United States.

== History ==
The alliance for the Lost Boys of Sudan was founded in 2004 by Joan Hecht.

== Description ==
The Alliance also provides humanitarian aid in Southern Sudan to include the construction of X-ray clinics and medicine for local hospitals, the drilling of eight water wells to provide clean water for rural villagers, houses and beds for children in Sudanese orphanages, funds to aid in the construction of schools and school supplies for students, goat programs for women at risk, distribution of solar lights to rural villagers and various other projects.

In addition to their humanitarian efforts in Southern Sudan, the Alliance has assisted over sixty five Lost Boys and US South Sudanese with college tuition and books and has provided medical assistance to over 100 Lost Boys and girls living in Jacksonville, Fl.
