= God Grew Tired of Us =

- Promotional poster
- Directed by: Christopher Dillon Quinn
- Produced by: Molly Bradford Pace; Christopher Dillon Quinn; Tom Walker
- Starring: John Dau; Nicole Kidman; Daniel Abul Pach; Panther Bior
- Cinematography: Bunt Young
- Edited by: Johanna Giebelhaus; Geoffrey Richman
- Music by: Gary Calamar; Jamie Saft
- Production companies: Silver Nitrate; National Geographic Films
- Distributed by: Newmarket Films
- Release date: 2006
- Running time: 86 minutes
- Language: English

God Grew Tired of Us is a 2006 American documentary film about three of the "Lost Boys of Sudan", a group of some 25,000 young men who have fled the wars in Sudan since the 1980s, and their experiences as they move to the United States. The film was written and directed by Christopher Dillon Quinn.

== Synopsis ==
God Grew Tired of Us chronicles the arduous journey of three Southern Sudanese men, John Bul Dau, Daniel Pach and Panther Bior, to the United States where they strive for a brighter future. As young boys in the 1980s, they had walked a thousand miles to escape their war-ridden homeland, and then had to make another arduous journey to escape Ethiopia.

During the five years they walked in search of safety, thousands died from starvation, dehydration, bomb raids and genocidal murder. Finally, they found safety in Kenya’s Kakuma refugee camp. In 2001, 3,600 lost boys, including John, Daniel and Panther, were invited by to live in America. Assisted by Catholic Charities International, the three boys live their lives and once again go on a journey, leaving behind thousands of other refugees who, in the course of their journey, have become their adopted extended family. They learn to adapt to the shock of being thrust into the culture of the United States. They dedicate themselves to doing whatever they can do to help those they left behind in Kakuma.

The title of the documentary comes from a quote John spoke while discussing the despair he and other Sudanese people felt during the civil war, expressing that he thought the suffering and killings he saw during his country's civil war may have been the final judgment on the earth spoken of in the Bible, because "God was tired of us, tired of the bad things the people were doing."

God Grew Tired of Us was produced, written and directed by Christopher Dillon Quinn and narrated by Nicole Kidman; the executive producer was Brad Pitt.

== Awards ==
At the 2006 Sundance Film Festival, the film won both the "Grand Jury Prize: Documentary" and the "Audience Award" in the "Independent Film Competition: Documentary" category.

The film also won best documentary at the Deauville Film Festival in France and the Galway Film Festival in Ireland.

Christopher Dillon Quinn was awarded The Emerging Documentary Filmmaker Award by the International Documentary Association in 2007 for directing God Grew Tired of Us.

== Music ==
- Guramayle – Gigi
- Gua – Emmanuel Jal
- Mai Wah Ihtagab – Abd El Gadir Salim

== See also ==
- International Rescue Committee

Awards
Preceded by Why We Fight	Sundance Grand Jury Prize: U.S. Documentary; 2006	Succeeded by Manda Bala (Send a Bullet)
