= Jonathan Safran Foer =

American novelist (born 1977)

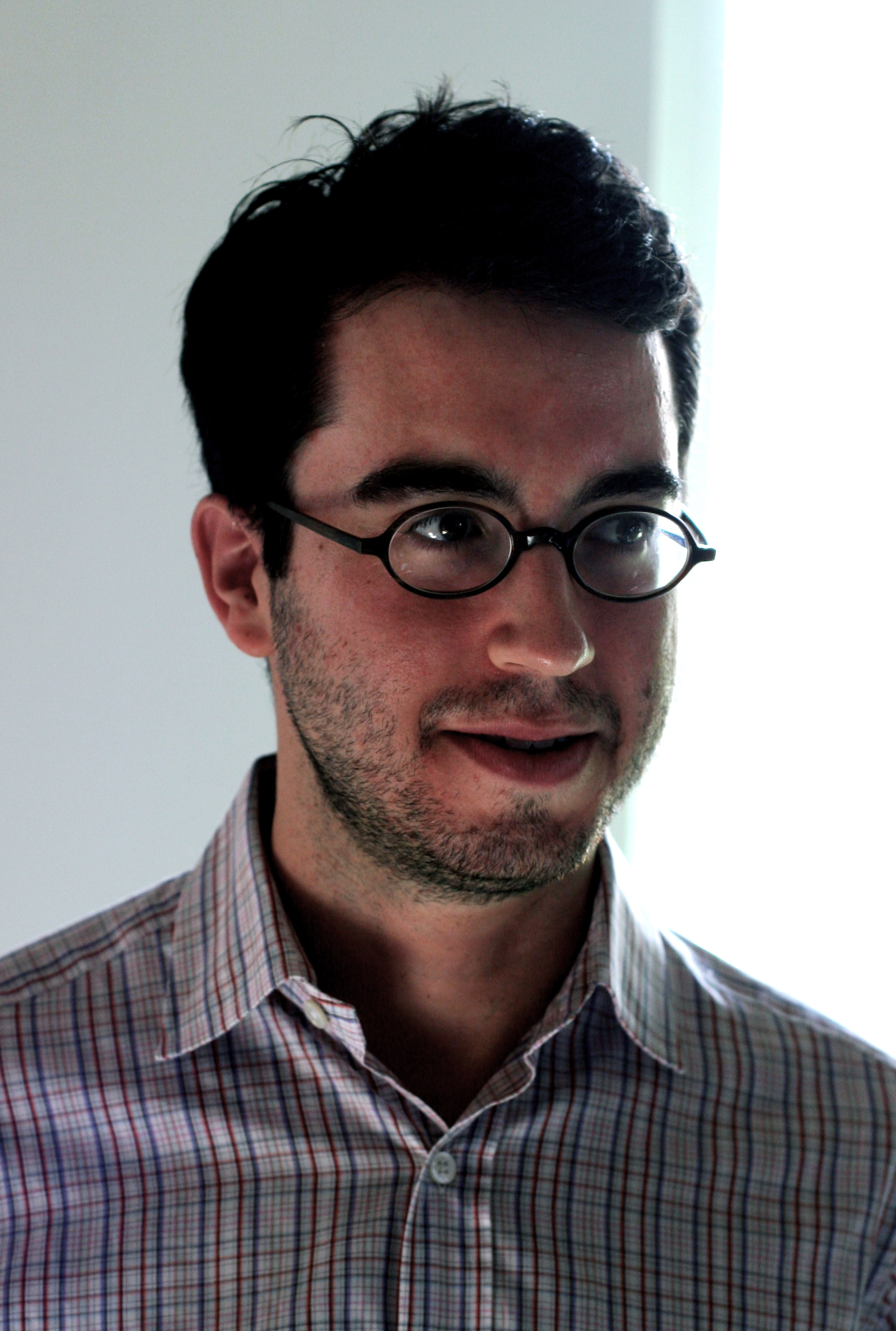
- Safran Foer in 2008
- Born: February 21, 1977 (age 49); Washington, D.C., U.S.
- Other name: JSF
- Education: Princeton University (BA); Mount Sinai Medical Center
- Occupation: Novelist
- Spouse: Nicole Krauss (m. 2004; div. 2014)
- Children: 2
- Parent: Esther Safran Foer (mother)
- Relatives: Franklin Foer (brother); Joshua Foer (brother)
- Writing career
- Notable work: Everything Is Illuminated (2002)

Jonathan Safran Foer (/fɔːr/; born February 21, 1977) is an American novelist. He is known for his novels Everything Is Illuminated (2002), Extremely Loud & Incredibly Close (2005), Here I Am (2016), and for his non-fiction works Eating Animals (2009) and We Are the Weather: Saving the Planet Begins at Breakfast (2019). He teaches creative writing at New York University.

== Early life ==
Safran Foer was born in Washington, D.C., as the son of Albert Foer, a lawyer and president of the American Antitrust Institute, and Esther Safran Foer, a child of Holocaust survivors born in Poland, who is now Senior Advisor at the Sixth & I Historic Synagogue. Safran Foer is the middle son of a Jewish family. His older brother, Franklin, is a former editor of The New Republic and his younger brother, Joshua, is the founder of Atlas Obscura and of Sefaria. Safran Foer was a "flamboyant" and sensitive child who, at the age of 8, was injured in a classroom chemical accident that resulted in "something like a nervous breakdown drawn out over about three years," during which "he wanted nothing, except to be outside his own skin."

Safran Foer attended Georgetown Day School and in 1994 traveled to Israel with other North American Jewish teenagers in a program sponsored by Bronfman youth fellowships. In 1995, while a freshman at Princeton University, he took an introductory writing course with author Joyce Carol Oates, who took an interest in his writing, telling him that he had "that most important of writerly qualities, energy." Safran Foer later recalled that "she was the first person to ever make me think I should try to write in any sort of serious way. And my life really changed after that." Safran Foer graduated with an A.B. in philosophy from Princeton in 1999 after completing a 40-page-long senior thesis, titled "Before Reading The Book of Anticedents: Intention, Literary Interpretation, and the Hypothesized Author", under the supervision of Gideon Rosen. Oates served as the advisor to Safran Foer's creative writing senior thesis, an examination of the life of his maternal grandfather, the Holocaust survivor Louis Safran. For his thesis, Safran Foer received Princeton's Senior Creative Writing Thesis Prize.

After graduating from Princeton, Safran Foer briefly attended the Mount Sinai School of Medicine before dropping out to pursue his writing career.

== Career ==
Safran Foer graduated from Princeton in 1999 with a degree in philosophy, and traveled to Ukraine to expand his thesis. In 2001, he edited the anthology A Convergence of Birds: Original Fiction and Poetry Inspired by the Work of Joseph Cornell, to which he contributed the short story, "If the Aging Magician Should Begin to Believe". His Princeton thesis grew into a novel, Everything Is Illuminated, which was published by Houghton Mifflin in 2002. The book earned him a National Jewish Book Award (2001) and a Guardian First Book Award (2002). Safran Foer shared the PEN/Robert W. Bingham Prize with fellow authors Will Heinrich and Monique Truong in 2004. In 2005, Liev Schreiber wrote and directed a film adaptation of the novel, which starred Elijah Wood.

Safran Foer's second novel, Extremely Loud & Incredibly Close, was published in 2005. In it, Safran Foer used 9/11 as a backdrop for the story of 9-year-old Oskar Schell, who learns how to deal with the death of his father in the World Trade Center. The novel used writing techniques known as visual writing. It follows multiple but interconnected storylines, is peppered with photographs of doorknobs and other such oddities, and ends with a 14-page flipbook. Safran Foer's use of these techniques resulted in both praise and excoriation from critics. Warner Bros. and Paramount turned the novel into a film, produced by Scott Rudin and directed by Stephen Daldry.

Safran Foer wrote the libretto for an opera titled Seven Attempted Escapes From Silence, which premiered at the Berlin State Opera on September 14, 2005.

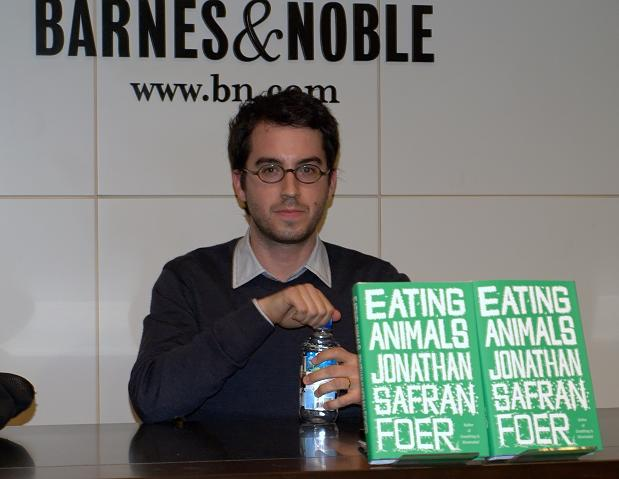
Safran Foer in New York to discuss his book Eating Animals

In 2008, Safran Foer taught writing for the first time as a visiting professor of fiction at Yale University. As of 2021, he teaches in the graduate creative writing program at New York University. Safran Foer published his third novel, Tree of Codes, in November 2010. In March 2012, The New American Haggadah, edited by Safran Foer and translated by Nathan Englander, was released to mixed reviews.

In 2009, Safran Foer published his fourth book, Eating Animals. A New York Times bestseller, Eating Animals provides a morally dense discussion of some of the ramifications that followed the proliferation of factory farms. It attempts to explain why and how humans can be so loving to our companion animals while simultaneously being indifferent to others, and explores what this inconsistency tells us about ourselves―what kinds of stories emerge from this selectivity. The book offers a significant focus on "storytelling"―the title of both the first and the last chapters of the book. Storytelling is Safran Foer's way of recognizing and dealing with the complexity of the subject that is eating animals, and suggests that, ultimately, our food choices tell stories about who we are, or, as Safran Foer has it in his book, "stories about food are stories about us―our history and our values."

In May 2012, Safran Foer signed a two-book deal with Little, Brown. His novel, Escape From Children's Hospital, was due for publication in 2014, but is no longer on the publisher's schedule. In September 2016, he released the novel Here I Am.

In 2019, as part of the book tour for We Are the Weather: Saving the Planet Begins at Breakfast, Safran Foer took part in an on stage conversation with Samin Nosrat about eating and climate change.

Safran Foer serves as a board member for Farm Forward, a nonprofit organization that implements innovative strategies to promote conscientious food choices, reduce farmed animal suffering, and advance sustainable agriculture.

== Views ==
Safran Foer has been an outspoken critic of the meat industry. In 2006, he recorded the narration for the documentary If This is Kosher..., an exposé of the kosher certification process that advocates Jewish vegetarianism. Safran Foer's first book of non-fiction, Eating Animals (2009), addresses problems associated with industrialized meat and the ensuing ethical concerns. He said that he had long been "uncertain about how I felt [about eating meat]" and that the birth of his first child inspired "an urgency because I would have to make decisions on his behalf".

In the wake of the COVID-19 pandemic, Safran Foer reiterated his argument that Americans should eat less meat on account of the meat industry's social, environmental, and humanitarian consequences.

In his personal life, Safran Foer has been an occasional vegetarian since the age of 10.

== Criticism ==
Because of Safran Foer's frequent use of modernist literary devices, he is often named as a polarizing figure in modern literature. In his critical article "Extremely Cloying & Incredibly False", Harry Siegel wrote in the New York Press, "Foer is supposed to be our new Philip Roth, though his fortune-cookie syllogisms and pointless illustrations and typographical tricks don't at all match up to or much resemble Roth even at his most inane."

In response to charges of historical inaccuracy in Everything is Illuminated, Safran Foer defended himself in The Guardian, writing, "Rather than aligning itself with either 'how things were' or 'how things could have been', the novel measures the difference between the two, and by so doing attempts to reflect a kind of experiential (rather than historical or journalistic) truth."

== Personal life ==
In June 2004, Safran Foer married writer Nicole Krauss. They lived in Park Slope in Brooklyn, New York, and have two sons. The couple divorced in 2014.

Safran Foer was a co-producer on the 2017 documentary film Eating Animals, adapted from his 2009 book of the same name, with actress Natalie Portman. In 2016, the two published their emails exchanges in a story for The New York Times Magazine; rumours ensued that Safran Foer left his wife for Portman and was rebuffed, which he has denied.

From 2015 until 2017, Safran Foer dated actress Michelle Williams.

== Bibliography ==
=== Fiction ===
- Everything Is Illuminated (2002)
- Extremely Loud & Incredibly Close (2005)
- Tree of Codes (2010)
- Here I Am (2016)

=== Non-fiction ===
- The Unabridged Pocketbook of Lightning (2005, essay, ISBN 978-0141023069)
- Eating Animals (2009)
- We Are the Weather: Saving the Planet Begins at Breakfast (2019)

== Recognition ==
- 2000 – Zoetrope: All-Story Fiction Prize
- 2003 – New York Public Library's Young Lions Fiction Award
- 2007 – included in Granta's Best of Young American Novelists 2.
- 2007 – Holtzbrinck Fellow at the American Academy in Berlin
- 2010 – included in The New Yorker's "20 Under 40" list
- 2013 – appointed to the U.S. Holocaust Memorial Council
- 2016 – included in The Forward's Forward 50 list as one of the fifty most influential Jewish-Americans of the year

== See also ==
- List of vegetarians
