= List of people claimed to possess an eidetic memory =

A number of people claim to have eidetic memory, but science has never found a single verifiable case of photographic memory. Eidetic imagery is virtually nonexistent in adults. Most people showing amazing memory abilities use mnemonic strategies, mostly the method of loci. This includes all winners of the annual World Memory Championships and most of the known scientific cases of excellent memories, like Solomon Shereshevsky. Regardless, the following list contains people who have claimed photographic memory.

== People claimed to possess an eidetic memory ==
- Bill Clinton, 42nd President of the United States, is said to possess a near photographic memory.
- Hu Jintao, former President of China, is said to have a photographic memory that was evident in his high school days.
- Jimmy Rollins of the Philadelphia Phillies has been described as having a photographic memory of games, at-bats and pitch sequences.
- Charles Nalder Baeyertz, a publisher and music critic in New Zealand. His capacity to memorize a page at a glance enabled him to display an apparently inexhaustible supply of knowledge and to acquire several languages. He claimed to have learnt Maori by memorizing a dictionary. His favourite party trick was to read a newspaper column then recite it backward.
- Winnie Bamara, Australian indigenous woman whose ability to paint scenes accurately and solely from memory attracted wide attention in the 1950s.
- Jacques Bergier, Russian-French chemical engineer and writer (1912-1978)
- David Boies, an American litigator, is frequently described as having a photographic memory that enables him to recite exact text, page numbers, and legal exhibits. Colleagues attribute his courtroom success in part to this ability.
- Daniel Tammet, British writer, essayist, and autistic savant with extraordinary abilities in mathematics and language learning, who holds the European record for reciting pi from memory to 22,514 digits.
- The Darawiish reciter Huseen Dhiqle could memorize upwards of a hundred poems of the Sayid's, each of them hundreds of lines long, after hearing them once.
- The mathematician Leonhard Euler has been characterized as having an eidetic memory. He was able to, for example, repeat the Aeneid of Virgil from beginning to end without hesitation, and for every page in the edition he could indicate which line was the first and which was the last even decades after having read it.
- Robert Evans could identify new objects that appear in starfields of 1,500 galaxies.
- Erik Gyllenfjäder, a Swedish man who murdered and cannibalised his girlfriend, was said by psychiatric doctors to possess a photographic memory.
- Akira Haraguchi holds the unofficial world record for the most decimal places of pi recited by memory. His ability is self-attributed to a strong eidetic memory, though he uses a mnemonic device.
- Sean McVay, an American NFL head coach for the Los Angeles Rams, can recall all plays from any game he has coached or participated in his career.
- LeBron James, an American basketball player, can recall where every player is during any point of a full 48 minute game.
- Klaus Kinski, a German actor, was described by Will Tremper as having a photographic memory, which allowed him to memorize a book page within minutes.
- Beth Levine, a cellular biologist, said to have had "an eidetic memory, drawing connections that others did not see..."
- C. S. Lewis, a literary scholar, novelist and religious writer, was described as "the best read man of his generation, one who read and remembers everything he read." His student Derek Brewer said that one could quote any line from Milton's epic Paradise Lost, and Lewis would continue reciting the poem from that point from memory. Other students of Lewis told of two separate occasions when Lewis invited them to select any book from Lewis' shelf, begin to read from a page at random, and Lewis would continue.
- Chaitanya Mahaprabhu, an Indian saint, is described in his biography as a "shruti-dhara", or "someone who could memorize anything immediately".
- Dimitri Mitropoulos, a Greek conductor, was noted for having an eidetic memory which enabled him to conduct without a score, even during rehearsals.
- Said Nursî, an Ottoman Islamic scholar who was able to recite many books from memory. For instance "... So then he [Molla Fethullah] decided to test his memory and handed him a copy of the work by Al-Hariri of Basra (1054–1122) — also famous for his intelligence and power of memory — called Maqamat al-Hariri. Said read one page once, memorized it, then repeated it by heart. Molla Fethullah expressed his amazement."
- Shas Pollak (Yiddish: Talmud-Pole), Jewish term for any mnemonist who memorized the exact layout of words in more than 5,422 pages of the 12 books of the standard edition of the Babylonian Talmud. However, the claim to eidetic memory was later disputed.
- Nigel Richards, New Zealand Scrabble player who, despite not speaking French, won the French World Scrabble Championships twice by studying the French dictionary for nine weeks, is said to possess an eidetic memory.
- Joseph Rosen, a world famous Rabbi and talmudic scholar. He claimed to remember every day of his life from the age of three, and would frequently remind his guests how many times they had conversed and regarding which topics. His books on Talmud are renowned for his ability to find novel solutions based on obscure and seemingly unrelated sources.
- Lucy Shapiro, professor of Developmental Biology at the Stanford University School of Medicine, in interview claims she has "an eidetic memory, so if I see a page or write something down, it's like taking a photograph. I can also move molecules around in three-dimensional space easily and see them"
- Abubakar Shekau, the leader of the Nigerian Islamist militant group Boko Haram, has been described as possessing a photographic memory.
- Sukarno, the father of Indonesian independence and the first president of the Republic of Indonesia, is said to have had a photographic memory, which helped him in his language learning.
- Nikola Tesla also is claimed to have possessed photographic memory.
- Arturo Toscanini, an Italian conductor. It was estimated that by the end of his career he had memorized over 200 symphonies and up to 100 operas. "One of his second grade school teachers, Signora Vernoni, noticed that Toscanini could memorize poems after a single reading and could pick out on the piano the songs and arias he had heard people singing."
- Leonardo da Vinci is said to have possessed photographic memory.
- Swami Vivekananda is believed to have eidetic memory as he could memorize a book just by going through it once.
- John von Neumann was able to memorize a column of the phone book at a single glance. Herman Goldstine wrote about him: "One of his remarkable abilities was his power of absolute recall. As far as I could tell, von Neumann was able on once reading a book or article to quote it back verbatim; moreover, he could do it years later without hesitation."
- Stephen Wiltshire is a prodigious savant, capable of drawing the entire skyline of a city after a helicopter ride.
- Koorathalvar, born in 1050 CE, was the chief disciple of the prominent Vaishnavite saint Ramanuja and was said to have memorized the Brahma Sutras word for word after being given only a short time to study it.
- Tim Rogers, an American video game developer and journalist, claims to suffer from hyperthymesia in several of his published works.
- Kim Peek, the savant who inspired the film Rain Man, could accurately recall the contents of at least 12,000 books from memory.
- Solomon Shereshevsky, a Russian journalist and mnemonist studied extensively by neuropsychologist Alexander Luria, possessed a remarkable memory with pronounced synesthesia.
- Ferdinand Marcos, former President of the Philippines, was claimed to have possessed photographic memory which helped him excel in law school and pass the bar examination with near-perfect scores.
- Marilu Henner, American actress known for her roles in Taxi and Evening Shade, has been diagnosed with hyperthymesia, a condition that gives her the ability to recall specific details from almost every day of her life since she was a child.
- Teddy Roosevelt, 26th President of the United States, was said to possess a near photographic memory and could reportedly recite entire books after reading them once.

== See also ==
- Exceptional memory – about the scientific background of research on exceptional memory
- Hyperthymesia, ability to remember specific details of virtually every day of one's life since childhood
