= Eidetic memory =

Ability to recall an image from memory after one viewing

Eidetic memory (/aɪˈdɛtɪk/ eye-DET-ik), also known as photographic memory or total recall, is the alleged ability to recall an image from memory with high precision—at least for a brief period of time—after seeing it only once and without using a mnemonic device.

Although the terms eidetic memory and photographic memory are popularly used interchangeably, they are also distinguished, with eidetic memory referring to the ability to see an object for a few minutes after it is no longer present and photographic memory referring to the ability to recall pages of text or numbers, or similar, in great detail. When the concepts are distinguished, eidetic memory is reported to occur in a small number of children and is generally not found in adults, while true photographic memory has never been demonstrated to exist.

The term eidetic comes from the Greek word εἶδος (pronounced [êːdos], eidos) "visible form".

== Eidetic vs. photographic ==
The terms eidetic memory and photographic memory are commonly used interchangeably, but they are also distinguishable. Scholar Annette Kujawski Taylor stated, "In eidetic memory, a person has an almost faithful mental image snapshot or photograph of an event in their memory. However, eidetic memory is not limited to visual aspects of memory and includes auditory memories as well as various sensory aspects across a range of stimuli associated with a visual image." Author Andrew Hudmon commented: "Examples of people with a photographic-like memory are rare. Eidetic imagery is the ability to remember an image in so much detail, clarity, and accuracy that it is as though the image were still being perceived. It is not perfect, as it is subject to distortions and additions (like episodic memory), and vocalization interferes with the memory."

"Eidetikers", as those who possess this ability are called, report a vivid afterimage that lingers in the visual field with their eyes appearing to scan across the image as it is described. Contrary to ordinary mental imagery, eidetic images are externally projected, experienced as "out there" rather than in the mind. Vividness and stability of the image begin to fade within minutes after the removal of the visual stimulus. Lilienfeld et al. stated, "People with eidetic memory can supposedly hold a visual image in their mind with such clarity that they can describe it perfectly or almost perfectly ..., just as we can describe the details of a painting immediately in front of us with near perfect accuracy."

By contrast, photographic memory may be defined as the ability to recall pages of text, numbers, or similar, in great detail, without the visualization that comes with eidetic memory. It may be described as the ability to briefly look at a page of information and then recite it perfectly from memory. Although often claimed, this type of ability has not been proven to exist.

== Prevalence ==
Eidetic memory is typically found only in young children, as it is virtually nonexistent in adults. Hudmon stated, "Children possess far more capacity for eidetic imagery than adults, suggesting that a developmental change (such as acquiring language skills) may disrupt the potential for eidetic imagery." Eidetic memory has been found in two to ten percent of children aged six to twelve. It has been hypothesized that language acquisition and verbal skills allow older children to think more abstractly and thus rely less on visual memory systems. Extensive research has failed to demonstrate consistent correlations between the presence of eidetic imagery and any cognitive, intellectual, neurological, or emotional measure.

A few adults have had phenomenal memories (not necessarily of images), but their abilities are also unconnected with their intelligence levels and tend to be highly specialized. In extreme cases, like those of Solomon Shereshevsky and Kim Peek, memory skills can reportedly hinder social skills. Shereshevsky was a trained mnemonist, not an eidetic memoriser, and there are no studies that confirm whether Kim Peek had true eidetic memory.

According to Herman Goldstine, the mathematician John von Neumann was able to recall from memory every book he had ever read.

== Skepticism ==
Skepticism about the existence of eidetic memory was prompted around 1970 by Charles Stromeyer, who studied his future wife, Elizabeth, who claimed that she could recall poetry written in a foreign language that she did not understand years after she had first seen the poem. She also could seemingly recall random dot patterns with such fidelity as to combine two patterns from memory into a stereoscopic image. She remains the only person documented to have passed such a test. However, the methods used in the testing procedures could be considered questionable (especially given the extraordinary nature of the claims being made), as is the fact that the researcher married his subject. Additionally, the fact that the tests have never been repeated raises further concerns for journalist Joshua Foer who pursued the case in a 2006 Slate magazine article. Foer concentrated on cases of unconscious plagiarism, expanding the discussion in Moonwalking with Einstein to assert that, of the people rigorously scientifically tested, no one claiming to have long-term eidetic memory had this ability proven.

American cognitive scientist Marvin Minsky, in his book The Society of Mind (1988), considered reports of photographic memory to be an "unfounded myth", and that there is no scientific consensus regarding the nature, the proper definition, or even the very existence of eidetic imagery, even in children.

Lilienfeld et al. stated: "Some psychologists believe that eidetic memory reflects an unusually long persistence of the iconic image in some lucky people". They added: "More recent evidence raises questions about whether any memories are truly photographic (Rothen, Meier & Ward, 2012). Eidetikers' memories are clearly remarkable, but they are rarely perfect. Their memories often contain minor errors, including information that was not present in the original visual stimulus. So even eidetic memory often appears to be reconstructive" (referring to the theory of memory recall known as reconstructive memory).

Scientific skeptic author Brian Dunning reviewed the literature on the subject of both eidetic and photographic memory in 2016 and concluded that there is "a lack of compelling evidence that eidetic memory exists at all among healthy adults, and no evidence that photographic memory exists. But there's a common theme running through many of these research papers, and that's that the difference between ordinary memory and exceptional memory appears to be one of degree."

== Trained mnemonists ==
To constitute photographic or eidetic memory, the visual recall must persist without the use of mnemonics, expert talent, or other cognitive strategies. Various cases have been reported that rely on such skills and are erroneously attributed to photographic memory.

An example of extraordinary memory abilities being ascribed to eidetic memory comes from the popular interpretations of Adriaan de Groot's classic experiments into the ability of chess grandmasters to memorize complex positions of chess pieces on a chessboard. Initially, it was found that these experts could recall surprising amounts of information, far more than nonexperts, suggesting eidetic skills. However, when the experts were presented with arrangements of chess pieces that could never occur in a game, their recall was no better than that of the nonexperts, suggesting that they had developed an ability to organize certain types of information, rather than possessing innate eidetic ability.

Individuals identified as having a condition known as hyperthymesia are able to remember very intricate details of their own personal lives, but the ability seems not to extend to other, non-autobiographical information. They may have vivid recollections such as who they were with, what they were wearing, and how they were feeling on a specific date many years in the past. Patients under study, such as Jill Price, show brain scans that resemble those with obsessive–compulsive disorder. In fact, Price's unusual autobiographical memory has been attributed as a byproduct of compulsively making journal and diary entries. Hyperthymestic patients may additionally have depression stemming from the inability to forget unpleasant memories and experiences from the past. It is a misconception that hyperthymesia suggests any eidetic ability.

Each year at the World Memory Championships, the world's best memorizers compete for prizes. None of the world's best competitive memorizers in these competitions have claimed to have a photographic memory.

== Notable claims ==
There are a number of individuals whose extraordinary memory has been labeled "eidetic", but it is not established conclusively whether they use mnemonics and other, non-eidetic memory-enhancement. "Nadia", who began drawing realistically at the age of three, is autistic and has been closely studied. During her childhood, she produced highly precocious, repetitive drawings from memory, remarkable for being in perspective (which children tend not to achieve until at least adolescence) at the age of three, which showed different perspectives on an image she was looking at. For example, at the age of three, she was obsessed with horses: after seeing a horse in a story book, she generated images of what a horse should look like in any posture. She could draw other animals, objects, and parts of human bodies accurately, but represented human faces as jumbled forms. Others have not been thoroughly tested, though savant Stephen Wiltshire can look at a subject once and then produce, often before an audience, an accurate and detailed drawing of it, and has drawn entire cities from memory, based on single, brief helicopter rides; his six-metre drawing of 305 square miles of New York City is based on a single twenty-minute helicopter ride. Another less thoroughly investigated instance is the art of Winnie Bamara, an Australian indigenous artist of the 1950s.

== In popular culture ==
Well-known fictional television characters include Batman, Sheldon Cooper (The Big Bang Theory), Mike Ross (Suits) , Dr. Spencer Reid (Criminal Minds), Shawn Spencer(Psych) and Will Hunting (Good Will Hunting).

== See also ==
- Ayumu – a chimpanzee whose performance in short-term memory tests is higher than university students
- Funes the Memorious – a short story by Jorge Luis Borges discussing the consequences of eidetic memory
- Hyperphantasia – the ability to create exceptionally vivid mental imagery
- Omniscience – particularly in Buddhism where adepts gain capacity to know "the three times" (past, present, and future), refers literally to having all knowledge.
- Spontaneous recovery
- Synaptic plasticity – ability of the strength of a synapse to change
