= Mazzon =

Mazzon is a surname. Notable people with the surname include:

- Giorgio Mazzon (born 1960), English footballer
- Hervé Mazzon (born 1959), French volleyball player
- Mazzon Chimbalu (born 2005), Malawian citizen

== See also ==
- Mazzone
- Mazzoni
