= Daniel McCartney =

American hyperthymesiac (1817–1887)

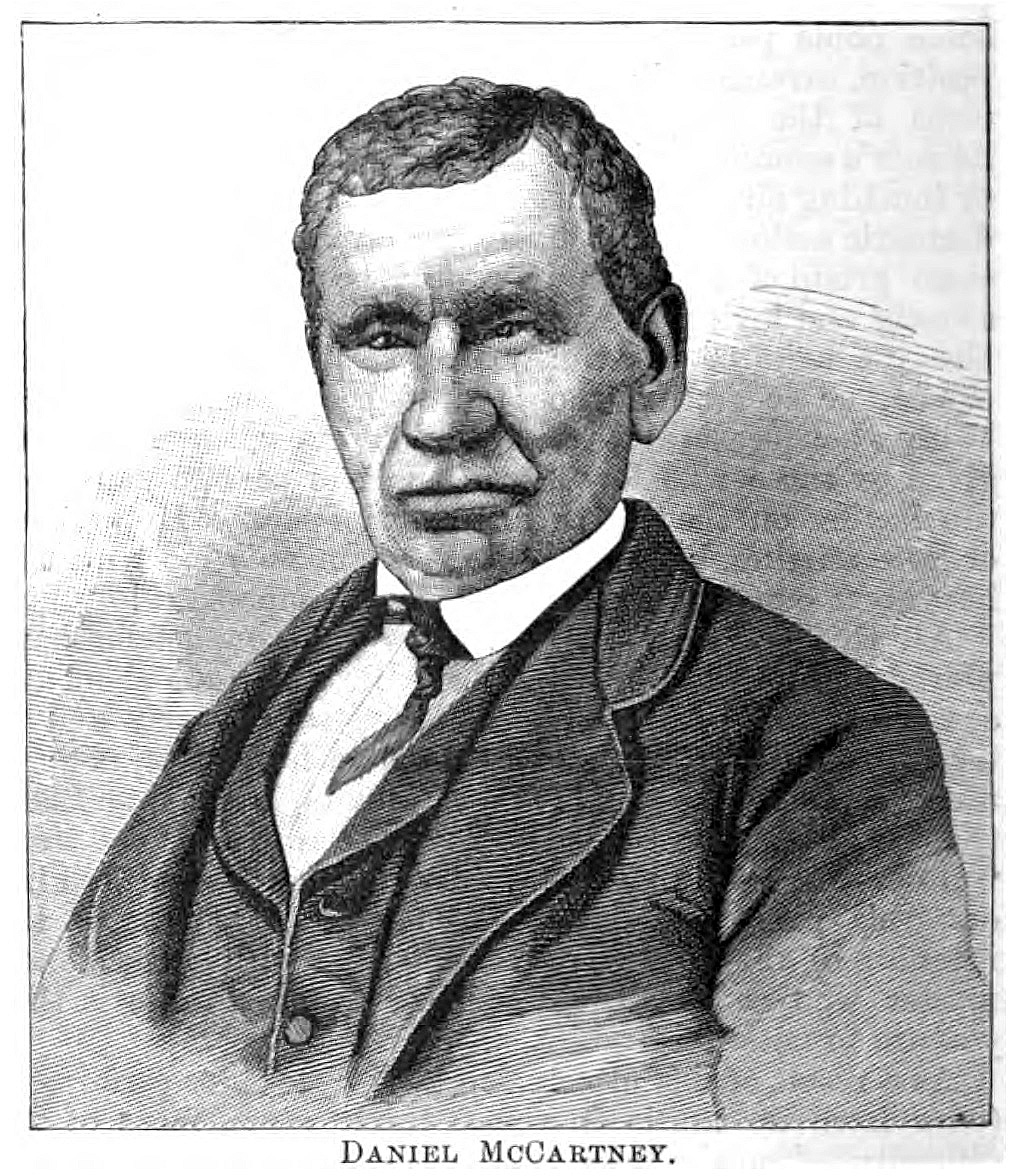
- Born: September 10, 1817
- Died: November 15, 1887 (aged 70)
- Known for: having hyperthymesia

Daniel McCartney (September 10, 1817 – November 15, 1887) was an American who had what is now known as highly superior autobiographical memory (HSAM).

McCartney was born in Westmoreland County, Pennsylvania. He was legally blind and lived with relatives throughout his lifetime. For a large part of his life, he resided in Morrow County, Ohio, before his final days in Muscatine, Iowa. He never married.

McCartney was famous for his mental ability in two specific areas: memory and calculation.

He remembered every single day of his life from the age of nine until his death. Given any specific calendar date, McCartney could, in seconds, give the day of the week, describe the weather conditions, describe what he did during the day, describe what he ate during the day, and provide details of local, regional and national events on that day. In a similar case to McCartney's, noted neurobiologist James McGaugh of the University of California, Irvine, one of the world's leading experts on human memory, reported a woman, Jill Price, with the astonishing ability to clearly remember events that happened to her decades before. McGaugh labeled this one-of-a-kind ability as hyperthymesia. McCartney's mental aptitude appears to be nearly identical to this recent case reported in McGaugh's study. McCartney, however, had an additional mental ability: mathematical computation.

McCartney could mentally compute difficult mathematical computations in seconds, and extremely difficult ones in minutes. McCartney was tested several times by panels of university mathematicians in which he was given a battery of mathematical questions. On one such examination in July 1870 in Salem, Ohio, McCartney was asked to take 89 to the sixth power, which he mentally computed in ten minutes, giving the correct answer of 496,981,290,961. On another examination he was asked to provide the cube root of 4,741,632 for which he answered correctly in three minutes — 168; and 389,017, for which he answered correctly in fifteen seconds — 73.

On occasion, special sessions for the general public were held to witness mental examinations of McCartney's unique abilities. During these public exhibitions, he was always correct in his responses, and would provide a response in a matter of seconds to the amazement of audiences.

He died at the age of 70 in Wilton, Iowa. McCartney was reported to be one of a number of great mental calculators.
