= Exceptional memory =

Types of accurate and detailed recall

Exceptional memory is the ability to have accurate and detailed recall in a variety of ways, including hyperthymesia, eidetic memory, synesthesia, and emotional memory. Exceptional memory is also prevalent in those with savant syndrome and mnemonists.

== Hyperthymesia ==
Hyperthymesia, or hyperthymestic syndrome, is superior autobiographical memory, the type of memory that forms people's life stories. The term hyperthymesia is derived from the Modern Greek word thýmesē 'memory' and Ancient Greek hypér 'over'.

The capabilities of the affected individuals are not limited to recalling specific events from their personal experience. Hyperthymesia has both enhanced autobiographical and episodic memory. There is an important characteristic of hyperthymesia: People with the syndrome have an unusual form of eidetic memory to remember as well as recall any specific personal events or trivial details, including a date, the weather, what people wore on that day, from their past, almost in an organized manner.

Unlike other people with advanced memory abilities, such as savant syndrome (who tend to use calendrical calculation), individuals with hyperthymestic syndrome rely heavily on their personal "mental calendar", which is an automatic and obsessive process. Moreover, individuals with hyperthymesia do not focus on practiced mnemonic strategies. For example, "AJ", who has the first documented case of hyperthymesia, has difficulty consciously applying her memory strategies to help her memorize new knowledge, making her rote memorization abilities below average. Importantly, having superior autobiographical memory does not translate to broadly superior memory; in fact across tests like a digit span, visual reproduction, and word-pair memorization, those with hyperthymesia have no statistically significant difference from a control group.

=== Neuroscience ===
Because it is a recently discovered memory capability, neuroscientific explanations of hyperthymesia are scarce. McGaugh, who coined the term, provides mostly speculation in "A Case of Unusual Autobiographical Remembering". He suggests that "AJ"'s superior autobiographical memory is largely the result of specific impairments rather than enhancements. Her sensitivity to cues that trigger her memories suggest that "AJ" has trouble inhibiting episodic-retrieval mode, which is the neurocognitive state required for present stimuli to be interpreted as memory cues. Because she is unable to "turn off" her retrieval mode, the smallest associations may bring on detailed recollections of "AJ"'s past.

Inhibition in itself is a type of executive functioning, thought to be associated with the right inferior frontal cortex. Although "AJ" is not autistic, McGaugh and colleagues note that she shares some of the executive-functioning deficits that occur with autism. These deficits, along with anomalous lateralization and "AJ"'s obsessive–compulsive tendencies, point to a neurodevelopmental frontostriatal disorder common in autism, OCD, ADHD, Tourette's syndrome, and schizophrenia. The frontostriatal system is made up of the dorsolateral prefrontal cortex, lateral orbitofrontal cortex, cingulate, supplementary motor area, and associated basal ganglia structures.

=== Cases ===
As of April 2016, there are an estimated 61 confirmed cases of hyperthymesia worldwide. Cases of hyperthymesia differ from related cases of savant memory in that savants have an extraordinary memory for specific hobbies, and events of a narrow basis, whereas cases of confirmed hyperthymesia show surprisingly detailed memory for specific and general events.

One subject, given any date in history, can recall what the weather was like on said date, personal details of their life at the time, and other news events that occurred at that time. Details of what the subject recalls may be significant to them in some way, but they may not be. Personal meaning does not seem to affect the subject's memory – they simply recall everything. In another confirmed case, the subject, when shown a photograph from his past, can recall the date it was taken, where it was taken, what they had done that day, and even more detailed information such as the temperature on said day.

=== Drawbacks ===
While many would consider hyperthymesia a positive trait, those with hyperthymesia also describe experiencing negative consequences of their enhanced memory. For example, one individual describes their memory as a "running movie that never stops". Furthermore, they describe viewing the world in "split screen", with the past constantly playing at the same time as the present. Similarly, the individual's superior memory does not seem to be due to a desire to apply memorizing techniques; their memorization of autobiographical information is non-conscious. Another negative aspect of hyperthymesia is that it could possibly stem from traumatic experiences in childhood in which the individual feels a need to organize memories, relive the past, and otherwise think about previous experiences more. One with exceptional memory can also recall unwanted events in great detail, such as being able to relive past traumatic events in their life, which can enhance the effects of the trauma.

== Eidetic memory ==
Eidetic memory, or total recall, is the accurate recall of images, sounds, and objects in a seemingly unlimited volume. Eidetic means "marked by an extraordinarily detailed and vivid recall of visual images". The term eidetic memory can become more clinical when the memory experts use the picture-elicitation method to detect the ability. In the picture elicitation method, children are asked to study an image for approximately twenty to thirty minutes, and then the researchers remove the picture, it has been found that children with such ability are able to recall the image with perfect accuracy after the picture has been removed. It has been suggested that children with eidetic memory can maintain the image in their memory as vividly as if it were still there.

There are reports of different forms of eidetic memory and new case studies that suggest a difference between photographic and eidetic memory, although not enough scientific data have been gathered. Public documents from the APA, Yale, and Harvard suggest otherwise and that more studies are being done to stimulate the differences; all current noted forms of memory are open to the public but not meant to discriminate against the hypothesis of new types. Older studies claimed to have observed a variety of drawbacks among those who have an apparent eidetic memory. Eidetic imagery can be so vivid as to mimic actual perception of stimuli, which can be much like a hallucination. (Compare hyperphantasia.) Some researchers of eidetic imagery have proposed a link between this ability and psychosis, such as in schizophrenic populations.

=== Criticism ===
Marvin Minsky argued in his book The Society of Mind that the reported cases of eidetic memory should be considered as "unfounded myth[s]". This view was supported by an experimental study conducted by psychologist Adriaan de Groot. The experiment was intended to investigate chess grandmasters' ability to memorize positions of chess pieces on a chessboard. When those chess experts were provided with arrangements that were inconsistent with a real chess game, their performance was about the same as non-experts. These results indicate that the eidetic ability of those chess grandmasters were not innate, but a learned strategy with certain types of information. Wilding and Valentine searched for people claiming to have an eidetic or otherwise superior memory via public media. Out of the 31 people who called in, only three actually had a significantly above-average but not eidetic memory.

Further cause for skepticism is given by a non-scientific event: The World Memory Championships. Held since 1991, this is an annual competition in different memory disciplines and is nearly totally based on visual tasks – nine out of ten events are displayed visually, the tenth event is presented by audio. Since the champions can win interesting prizes, it should attract people who can beat those tests easily by reproducing visual images of the presented material during the recall. But indeed, not a single memory champion has ever been reported to have an eidetic memory. Instead, without a single exception, all winners consider themselves mnemonists (see below) and rely on using mnemonic strategies, mostly the method of loci.

=== Cases ===
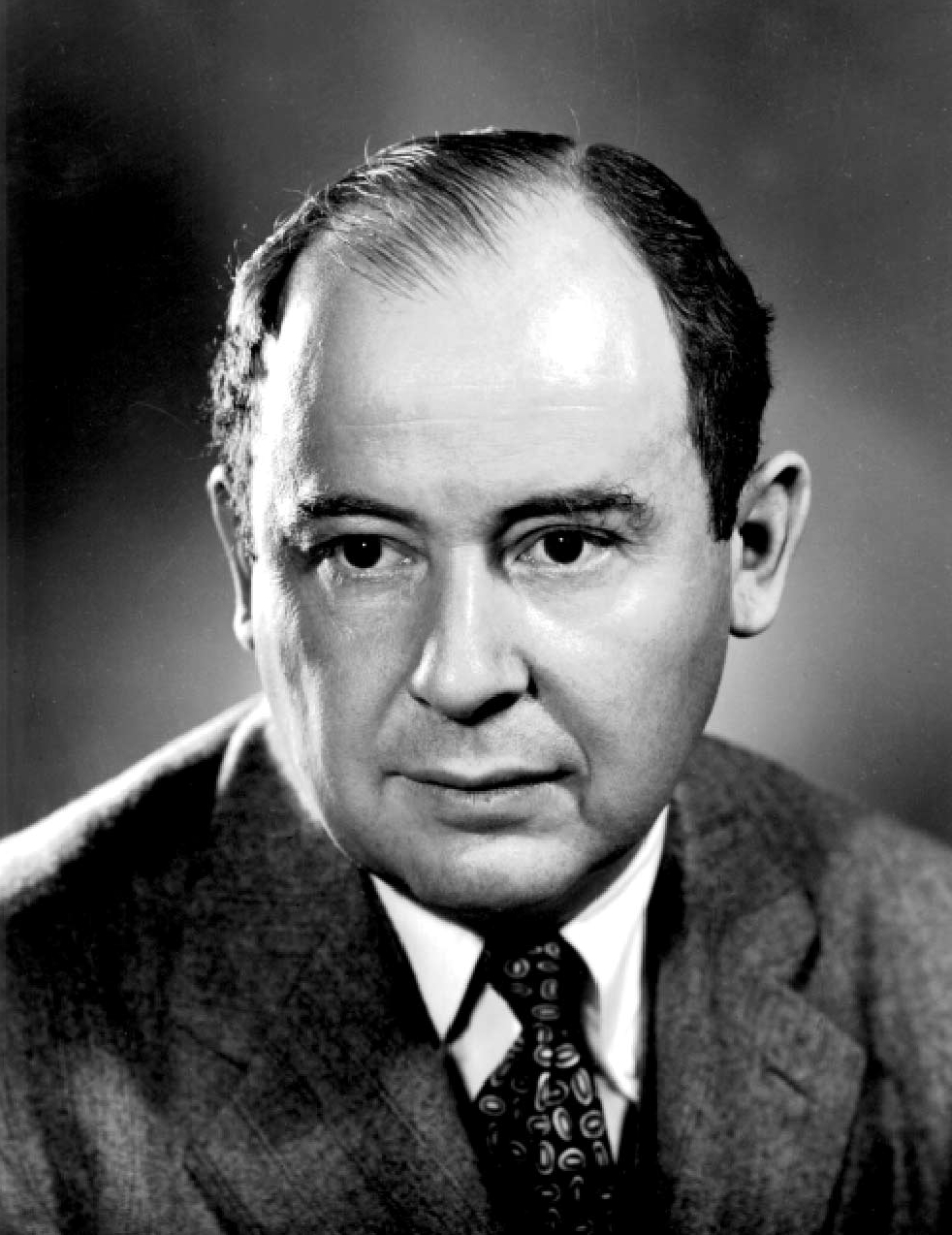
John von Neumann possessed near-total recall.

Cases of eidetic memory have been reported for generations, with a 1970 study on a woman being called the most convincing documentation yet. Her memory was extraordinary in that she could see an image once and retain it in memory for years to come. The classic study of the subject's memory documents her writing out poetry in a foreign language, of which she had no prior knowledge, years after seeing the original text. This suggests that her memory retained the image of the foreign words vividly enough to recall years later. Reports also suggest that her memory was so vivid that she could obscure other parts of the present visual field with these memories.

However, this subject remains the only person to have passed such a test, and the credibility of the findings are highly questionable, given that the researcher married his subject, and the tests have never been repeated. The study fueled strong skepticism about studies of eidetic memory for several decades thereafter. Recently there has been a renewal of interest in the area, with more careful controls, and far less spectacular results. Supposedly Hungarian mathematician John von Neumann could recite exactly word for word any books he had read, including page numbers and footnotes – even those of books he had read decades earlier.

Franco Magnani is a memory artist. Magnani was born in Pontito in 1934. Pontito is a small town in the hills of Tuscany which had a population of 500 people before the Second World War, which decreased to just 70 people, made up of the elderly and retirees, following the war. The small town fell into disarray when the agrarian economy had dwindled. In 1965, this prompted the thirty-one year old Magnani to leave his childhood home of Pontito, a decision which was deeply troubling as he had decided not to return. After making his decision, Magnani became very ill. It is unclear what this illness was exactly but, symptoms included high fever, weight loss, delirium, and possibly even seizures. For this, Magnani was placed into a sanatorium. Here he had vivid dreams of his hometown, not of his family or friends or even of events, but of the town itself. According to Magnani, the dreams were in a detail beyond anything he could consciously imagine.

After getting released from the hospital, Franco Magnani considered, but ultimately rejected medical possibilities that were suggested. These possibilities included some sort of freudian splitting of the ego which could have resulted in hypermnesia hysteria. While Magnani rejected these notions, he never allowed them to be properly explored. Once relocating to San Francisco, Magnani picked up painting, which he had no formal training in. His first painting was of his childhood home in Pontito. Magnani painted the house in remarkable accuracy, so much so that he himself was amazed. This was especially surprising considering the fact that at this point, Magnani had not been to Pontito in over 25 years. Over time, he grew an obsession with painting the town in which he had grown up in; as famed psychologist Oliver Sacks noted in 1987, Magnini seemed "possessed".

That same year, photographer Susan Schwartzenberg went to Pontito to photograph the scenes of many of Magnani's paintings. This was done as part of a study to document the astonishing accuracy of the artist's work. This study would be revealed in an art exhibit on memory in 1988. This garnered much attention by researchers such as Bob Miller, who suggested that this work could reveal the accuracy, distortions, and inventions of Magnani's memory. These photographs showed something interesting about Magnani's work that was not previously evident. The Exploratorium, which hosted the exhibit for which Schwartzenberg took photos for, explains this observation while examining a drawing of a church. "This drawing, looking down from a point high above the path approaching the church, shows a view that Magnani could never have seen." Work done by Baddley and Hitch in 1974 showed the importance of the visuospatial sketchpad in their model of working memory. The VSS stores visual and spatial information as part of short-term memory, which is used in working memory for problem solving. This is miraculous due to the fact that Magnani imagined and painted, with incredible accuracy, perspectives that he couldn't have possibly ever seen. His visual sensory information was stored long-term, which he was able to recall more than a quarter of a century later in intricate detail. This prompted praise from Sacks, stating that this rare phenomenon made him an eidetic artist. Sacks went on to say: "he could seemingly reproduce with almost photographic accuracy every building, every street, every stone of Pontito, far away, close up, from any possible angle."

== Savants ==
Savant syndrome, also known as savantism, is a condition in which individuals with a developmental disorder are exceptional in one or more areas.

=== Neuroscience ===
Autistic spectrum disorders (ASD) are characterized by difficulties in reciprocal social behaviour and communication, stereotyped patterns of behaviour, and restricted interests. They are also associated with typical and atypical functioning in memory. Structural abnormalities have been found to affect the hippocampus, with the perirhinal, entorhinal, and parahippocampus less affected (these are areas in the medial temporal lobe outside of the hippocampus). The hippocampus is thought to be involved in domain-general relational processes, with surrounding areas mediating more domain and item-specific and contextual processing. This is consistent with observed memory effects of ASD which shows superior low-level and item-specific processing, at a cost of having impairments in higher level relational processes.

One example found in the literature is J.S., with high functioning autism. J.S. has no episodic memory (which is highly associative or relational in nature) and must rely on memorizing facts. He will memorize entire conversations, so as to remember even general content later. He also remembers events by memorizing A-B-C predicates—item-specific memory with a memorized (specific) association connecting them.

=== Cases ===
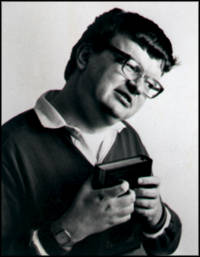
Kim Peek, diagnosed with Savant syndrome

Savant syndrome is elaborate abilities (including memory) in specialized areas such as a hobby or event, or a certain type of information. One of the most well-known cases of savant memory is Kim Peek, the man on which the movie Rain Man was based. Peek had a reported savant memory for most information, not just specialized pieces, and was able to memorize large pieces of information from the age of 16 months. Tony DeBlois and Derek Paravicini also show superior memory for music. DeBlois can play 8000 songs from memory on 20 different instruments, and Paravicini can play a piece of music after hearing it only once. Another case of savant memory was that of Richard Wawro. Wawro was known for his paintings of landscapes and seascapes, all done in elaborate detail. What was interesting about Wawro's art was that he painted from seeing a scene only once and did not use a model. His memory for the scene was so elaborate that he could also report where he drew the picture and when. Similarities across cases indicate that savant memory may be similar to eidetic memory.

Daniel Tammet is a savant with an exceptional memory for numbers. He began to associate numbers with images after experiencing an epileptic seizure at the age of four. Each digit for Tammet has color, shape, and emotion, allowing him to memorize sequences of numbers or perform large calculations within a matter of seconds. One of his most notable achievements was being able to recite Pi to 22,514 decimal places, taking him over five hours.

Savant memory varies among different savants. Similar to DeBlois and Paravicini, an autistic savant named Leslie Lemke has displayed extraordinary musical talent. Lemke lacks the capacity for abstract reasoning, but he has several abilities that coincide with his exceptional memory. Like Paravicini, he is able to replicate music perfectly after hearing a piece only once. Along with being developmentally disabled, he has a disorder known as echolalia, a condition that involves the rote, often meaningless, repetition of words or sentences recited by others; however, when he does recite these words of whoever he hears throughout the day, his recall is almost always perfect.

=== Drawbacks ===
Autism spectrum disorders contain criteria for diagnosis based on difficulties with social behaviour and communicating with others, amongst other debilitating criteria. Most cases of calendrical calculation involve individuals with IQs that are below average. Researchers have proposed two hypotheses to explain how autistic individuals may develop advanced skills; the first is the obsession with constricted areas of interest (a common symptom of autism) and central coherence. Central coherence is a style of cognitive processing indicative of an autistic individual, which involves a focus on local features during processing. Researchers feel that this style of processing may aid in the increase of savant skills, but this style also sacrifices global processing in the process.

== Mnemonists ==
A mnemonic device is a memory aid that is used to help an individual remember and recall information. Mnemonic devices are usually verbal, such as a special phrase, word or a short poem that individuals are familiar with.

Each individual has two types of memory, termed "natural memory" and "artificial memory". Mnemonic strategy is said to help develop artificial memory through learning and practicing memory techniques.

Common mnemonics for memorizing lists of words is through the use of acronym, which is the abbreviation that consists of the initial letter in a phrase or word. For example, HOMES is often used to help remember the names of the Great Lakes of North America. Most techniques for memorizing numbers involve turning the numbers into visual images that are then placed along points of an imaginary memory journey. The mind has difficulty remembering abstract concepts like numbers but can easily remember visual images. The imaginary memory journey orders the images in the correct sequence. Two common techniques for converting numbers and playing cards into visual images are the Mnemonic major system and the Mnemonic dominic system.

=== Neuroscience ===
No structural differences have been found in the brains of accomplished mnemonists, who have achieved superior memory with the practiced use of mnemonic devices. One study that sought to locate the neural differences between these and people with typical memory abilities using fMRI, was unable to find any differences. For mnemonists, the right cingulate cortex, ventral fusiform cortex, and left posterior inferior frontal sulcus were more active for digit span memorization (a feat mnemonists are often very good at). However, all superior memory participants reported the use of mnemonics.

=== Cases ===
An interesting case of recall is of the subject S.F., who began testing with an average intelligence and average memory capabilities. With the use of mnemonic strategies (practice sessions in the laboratory) he was able to increase his digit span from 7 to 79. Specifically, S.F. was a long-distance runner and would form small groups of the digit span into meaningful and memorable numbers for a runner (ex. Qualifying times). Using mnemonics for memory recall may also have played a part in Akira Haraguchi's world record citation of mathematical pi. Cases such as these suggest that superior memory can be achieved with the proper mnemonic techniques.

Also, all competitors of the annual World Memory Championships name mnemonic strategies the source for their performances, including performances like memorizing a list of more than 2000 digits in an hour, 280 words in 15 minutes or the order of a deck of cards in under 25 seconds. Chunking is another type of mnemonic device. This is a technique that involves grouping items together to improve sequential memory by having each item in mind generate a complete series of items. Many mnemonists credit chunking as their primary mnemonic device. One of the most well-known champions of memory who incorporates chunking as one of her primary memory techniques is Yanjaa Wintersoul. She was able to memorize all 328 pages of an Ikea catalogue in less than a week using mnemonics. These competitors demonstrate the power that mnemonics can have on enhancing recall and enabling the capacity for exceptional memory.

=== Drawbacks ===
Drawbacks are typically considered uncommon with the use of mnemonics since they are used as a tool to enhance memory ability, but there are qualities that can be considered negative. For example, it can take a significant amount of time to learn a mnemonic device, but this device may not be used often enough for it to be worthwhile. While mnemonics have been shown to increase recall capacity within a variety of contexts, the spatial context of mnemonics still contains the possibility of intrusion errors as well.

== Synesthesia ==
Synesthesia, a condition in which the stimulation of one sense causes an activation or reaction of one or more senses simultaneously, can be used as a mnemonic device to enable exceptional memory. One of the most common forms of synesthesia is grapheme-color synesthesia, where an individual perceives numbers and/or letters associated with colors. Associating colors or words to letters or sounds can allow certain forms of synesthetes to learn new languages, lyrics, or detailed information quite easily. When seeking to learn novel categories, synesthetes tend to use their unusual experiences as mnemonic devices, aiding them in their memory process. Furthermore, synesthetic imagery can work as a cognitive tool in aiding those with synesthesia to memorize and store language through their own personal coding. Those with more common forms of synesthesia may experience sounds as colors or words as having tastes; in these cases the sounds and words are considered the inducers, while the colors and tastes are considered concurrent. Not all people with synesthesia necessarily have exceptional memory, but it is most often based on how the condition is used in regard to learning. Synesthesia is most often congenital, but it is possible for it to develop later on in life.

=== Neuroscience ===
For grapheme-color synesthesia, studies display greater white matter connections happening between the fusiform gyrus (area responsible for processing the shape of numbers or letters) and color area V4 in brains of synesthetes. These types of synesthetes display higher functioning in the ventral visual stream, and since graphemes and words have enhanced spatial frequency as well as contrast information, greater processing of these features leads to quicker access to lexical information.

=== Cases ===
One well known case of superior recall ability through synesthesia is the case of Solomon Shereshevskii also known as "S". This ability was discovered during a work meeting where Shereshvskii was scolded for not taking notes until he was able to perfectly recite the conversation. Alexander Luria reported that "S" had the unique ability to recall almost everything he heard or saw though did not provide detailed evidence or clearly distinguish between "natural" abilities and his use of the method of loci. There are several anecdotal reports of "S" recalling a speech word for word without taking notes along with his peers. "S" is commonly considered a mnemonist as well, given that he applied his synesthesia as an aid toward acquiring exceptional memory.

=== Drawbacks ===
Solomon Shereshevskii, or 'S', was viewed by peers as disorganized and unintelligent. His extreme case of synesthesia, causing highly detailed and recallable memory traces, made understanding abstract concepts not based on sensory and perceptual qualities very difficult for him. His personal life is described as being lived in a "haze", and eventually he was confined to a mental institution because of the burden of his exceptional abilities. But S is a rare exception and drawbacks are not normally associated with the acquisition of an exceptional memory by using synesthesia mnemonically.

== Emotional memory ==
An emotional or flashbulb memory refers to the memory of a personal significant event with distinctly vivid and long-lasting detailed information. These events are usually shocking and with photographic quality. Brown and Kulik, who coined the term, found that many highly emotional memories can be recalled with very accurate details, even when there is a delay after the event.

A flashbulb memory is said to be less accurate and less permanent than photographic memories, but its forgetting curve is less affected by time in comparing to other types of memories. One important aspect of flashbulb memory is that it involves emotional arousal when the event is being remembered. Therefore, this kind of memory does not have to be accurate, and the accuracy usually decreases during the first 3 months and goes up again at about 12 months. An example of the errors and malleability of flashbulb memories is found in the El Al Flight 1862 crash. Despite widespread photos and videos of the effects of the crash, there is no video evidence of the crash itself. Despite this, when study participants were asked if they witnessed a video of the crash, over 60 percent claimed to have seen the video on television. Some participants were even willing to offer more information such as the angle of the crash or whether the plane was on fire, despite the lack of video.

A study conducted by Sharot et al. (2006) showed that the rating of vividness of terrorist attack on 11 September 2001, by the participants is related to the physical location of the person when the event happened.

=== Neuroscience ===
The focus of the research on emotional memory is on the role of the amygdala. In one study participants watched either an emotionally arousing film or a neutral film. Results of a PET scan showed correlation between right Amygdaloid Complex (AC) activity and recall for emotional elements of the film when participants were asked to remember the film a few weeks later. Although this study demonstrates the involvement of the AC, it offers no insight as to the specific role of the amygdala. McGaugh and colleagues posit that although electrical and pharmaceutical stimulation directly to the amygdala can enhance or decrease memory, the amygdala is not the main site for any long-term memory storage. Rather, the amygdala acts as a modulator for storage processes occurring in other areas of the brain. Long-term memories are not created automatically, they must be consolidated over time. Research indicates that it is this consolidation process in which the AC plays an assisting role (there is no evidence that it aids in retrieval). Specifically, McGaugh suggests that emotional arousal activates the amygdala, which regulates the strength of a memory, lending to enhanced memory for emotionally charged events.

The amygdala itself is a collection of nuclei with distinct functions, the basolateral AC the most involved with memory. The BL projects into the hippocampus and entorhinal cortex and stimulation of the AC functioning activates both of these areas. Further indication that the amygdala works to modulate other areas of the brain is supported by the fact that AC stimulation is mediated by the stria terminalis (ST), a major AC pathway. Lesions of the ST block AC stimulation effects.

AC and ST lesions also appear to block hormonal and adrenaline enhancements. Stress hormones produced by emotional situations influence memory storage. Memory can also be selectively enhanced by post-training administration of drugs and hormones. It is also well known that emotional situations produce an "adrenaline rush". This adrenaline, as well as cortisol (adrenocortical hormone) serve to influence an organism's response to stress, but also may aid future responding by enhancing declarative memory of them.

Negative emotional experiences may be remembered better than positive experiences. Goddard found that retention was disrupted with electrical stimulation of AC after aversive learning, but not with appetitively motivated learning.

=== Drawbacks ===
An experience must be very arousing to an individual for it to be consolidated as an emotional memory, and this arousal can be negative, thus causing a negative memory to be strongly retained. Having a long-lasting extremely vivid and detailed memory for negative events can cause a great deal of anxiety, as seen in post traumatic stress disorders. Individuals with PTSD endure flashbacks to traumatic events, with much clarity. Many forms of psychopathology show a tendency to maintain emotional experiences, especially negative emotional experiences, such as depression and generalized anxiety disorder. Patients with phobias are unable to cognitively control their emotional response to the feared stimuli.

Although, not having the ability to use emotional memories for guiding future behaviours can be detrimental, as has been hypothesized as a potential cause to the lack of goal oriented behaviours in schizophrenic individuals.

== See also ==
- Art of memory
- Memory sport
- Method of loci
- Omniscience
- World Memory Championships
