= Brad Williams (mnemonist) =

American mnemonist (born 1956)

Brad Williams (born October 8, 1956) is an American man from Prairie du Chien, Wisconsin who is considered by scientists to have one of the best memories in the world and one of the only 62 people in the world who has been confirmed by researchers as having a condition called hyperthymestic syndrome. He can remember almost every day of his life, easily naming the day of the week, date, month, and year of innumerable personal and public events.

Williams is the author of the Triviazoids, a daily blog showing unusual connections in history for that particular date. He is the subject of the documentary Unforgettable (2010) by his brother Eric Williams and of a part of the episode Super Special of Stan Lee's Superhumans. Williams won the Wisconsin Spelling Bee in 1969 at the age of 12 and has worked as a pronouncer for the Wisconsin Spelling Bee since 1978. He also worked as a radio newsman.

== See also ==
- USA Memory Championship
- Solomon Shereshevsky
