= Mazzoni =

Mazzoni is an Italian surname. The earliest members of the Mazzoni listed here hailed from either Emilia-Romagna or its western neighbor Tuscany in the 15th century. Other (and less notable) members have been consistently recorded in the Serchio River Valley of Tuscany – especially in the vicinity of Barga – since the 16th century.

== Surname ==
- Alfredo Mazzoni, Italian professional football player and coach
- Angelo Mazzoni, Italian Olympic fencer
- Angiolo Mazzoni, Italian architect
- Antonio Maria Mazzoni, Italian composer
- Carlo Mazzoni, Italian actor
- Cesare Mazzoni, Italian painter
- Corrado Mazzoni (1892–1917), Italian World War I lieutenant
- Cory Mazzoni, American professional baseball pitcher
- Dave Mazzoni, American film director, producer, and screenwriter
- Emiliano Mazzoni, Italian astronomer
- Erminia Mazzoni, Italian politician
- Giuliana Mazzoni, Italian psychologist and researcher
- Giuliano Mazzoni, Italian rally driver
- Giulio Mazzoni, Italian painter and stuccoist
- Guido Mazzoni (poet), Italian poet and professor
- Guido Mazzoni (sculptor), Italian sculptor
- Guy Mazzoni, French chess player
- Isabella Discalzi Mazzoni, Italian sculptor, active late 15th century
- Jacopo Mazzoni, Italian philosopher
- Javier Mazzoni, Argentine soccer player
- Kerry Mazzoni, American politician
- Luca Mazzoni, Italian soccer player
- Marco Mazzoni, Italian artist
- Margherita Pavesi Mazzoni, Italian painter, sculptor and poet
- Peter Mazzoni, American physician
- Pier Luigi Mazzoni, Archbishop of Gaeta
- Roberto Mazzoni, Italian sports shooter
- Sebastiano Mazzoni, Italian painter
- Torquato Mazzoni (1824 – after 1869), Italian painter
- Vittorio Mazzoni, Italian physiologist, discoverer of Mazzoni's corpuscles and joint discoverer of Golgi-Mazzoni bodies
- Vittorio Mazzoni della Stella (born 1941), Italian politician

== Fictional people ==
- Apothecary Mazzoni, a character in The Flame and the Arrow
