= Center for the Neurobiology of Learning and Memory =

Research institute in Irvine, California

Coordinates: 33.646°N 117.846°W

- Established: 1983
- Field of research: Neurobiology
- Director: Michael A. Yassa
- Location: Irvine, California, United States
- Operating agency: University of California, Irvine
- Website: cnlm.uci.edu

The Center for the Neurobiology of Learning and Memory (CNLM) is a research center established in 1983 in the School of Biological Sciences at the University of California, Irvine that studies memory and learning. Center faculty reported the first known case of hyperthymesia; they have also done research on false memory syndrome. James McGaugh was the founding director, and noted memory expert Elizabeth Loftus is a research fellow of the center.

Michael A. Yassa, professor of neurobiology and behavior and James L. McGaugh Endowed Chair, has served as center director since 2016.

== See also ==
- Neurobiology
- Learning & Memory
- James McGaugh
