= Away with Words =

1999 Hong Kong-Japanese film by Christopher Doyle

Away With Words
- DVD cover of film from its release in India.
- Directed by: Christopher Doyle
- Written by: Christopher Doyle; Tony Rayns
- Produced by: Hiro Tokimori; Noburu Uoya
- Starring: Tadanobu Asano; Kevin Sherlock; Mavis Xu
- Cinematography: Christopher Doyle
- Edited by: Anne Goursaud
- Release date: 7 August 1999
- Running time: 90 minutes
- Countries: Hong Kong; Japan
- Languages: Cantonese; English; Japanese

Away with Words (Chinese: 三條人; lit. 'Three Life-stories', 孔雀; lit. Peacock) is a 1999 auteur trilingual (Japanese, English, Cantonese) film by Christopher Doyle co-scripted by Doyle and Tony Rayns and starring Tadanobu Asano, Kevin Sherlock and Mavis Xu.

The film, shot in a jazzy, free-wheeling style and featuring Doyle's signature hyper-kinetic, oversaturated photography and eccentric humor, focuses on a trip that Asano's character takes to Hong Kong and his encounters with off-beat personalities populating the metropolitan landscape (among them, a beer-drinking amnesiac gay bar owner portrayed by Kevin Sherlock). Another narrative thread relies on flashbacks into Asano's character's childhood in Okinawa. The protagonist suffers from overbearing excesses of his memory, mnemonic associations and synesthesia. The emerging human attachments provide an emotional center and a source of serenity to offset the rampage of the protagonist's mind and tame the lavish disarray of urban imagery.

The film credits Jorge Luis Borges (presumably Funes the Memorious) and Alexander Luria for inspiration. Many aspects of Asano's character (memory excess, profound synesthesia, arranging memories visually along roads, wordplay, struggling with an onslaught of associations, comments about restaurant music and its effect on food taste, the waking-for-school scene) are directly borrowed from Luria's real life case study of Solomon Shereshevskii, The Mind of a Mnemonist.

The film was screened in the Un Certain Regard section at the 1999 Cannes Film Festival.

== Cast ==
- Tadanobu Asano - Asano Takashi
- Kevin Sherlock - Kevin
- Mavis Xu - Susie
- Takanori Kubo - Asano Takashi (Boy)
- Christa Hughes - Christa
- Georgina Dobson - Georgina
