= Funes the Memorious =

Short story by Jorge Luis Borges

- Short story by Jorge Luis Borges
- Original title: Funes el memorioso
- Country: Argentina
- Language: Spanish
- Genre: short story

Publication
- Published in: Ficciones
- Publisher: Editorial Sur
- Media type: Print
- Publication date: 1942
- Published in English: 1954

"Funes the Memorious" (original Spanish title Funes el memorioso) (Note: The title has also been translated as "Funes, His Memory." The Spanish "memorioso" means "having a vast memory," and is a fairly common word in both Spanish and Portuguese languages. Because "memorious" is a rare word in modern English, some translators opt for this alternate translation.) is a short story by Argentine writer Jorge Luis Borges (1899–1986). First published in La Nación of June 1942, it appeared in the 1944 anthology Ficciones, part two (Artifices). The first English translation appeared in 1954 in Avon Modern Writing No. 2.

"Funes the Memorious" is the tale of one Ireneo Funes, who, after falling off his horse and receiving a bad head injury, acquired the amazing talent—or curse—of remembering absolutely everything.

== Plot summary ==
The narrator, a version of Borges himself, meets Ireneo Funes, a teenage boy who lives in Fray Bentos, Uruguay, in 1884. Borges's cousin asks the boy for the time, and Funes replies instantly, without the aid of a watch and accurate to the minute.

Borges returns to Buenos Aires, then in 1887 comes back to Fray Bentos, intending to relax and study some Latin. He learns that Ireneo Funes has meanwhile suffered a horseback riding accident and is now hopelessly crippled. Soon enough, Borges receives a note from Funes, requesting that the visitor lend him some of his Latin books and a dictionary. Borges, disconcerted, sends Funes what he deems the most difficult works "in order fully to undeceive him".

Days later, Borges receives a telegram from Buenos Aires calling for his return due to his father's ill health. As he packs, he remembers the books and goes to Funes's house. Funes's mother escorts him to a patio where the youth usually spends his dark hours. As he enters, Borges is greeted by Funes's voice speaking perfect Latin, reciting "the first paragraph of the twenty-fourth chapter of the seventh book of the Historia Naturalis" (by Pliny the Elder).

Funes enumerates to Borges the cases of prodigious memory cited in the Historia Naturalis, and adds that he marvels that those are considered marvellous. He reveals that, since his fall from the horse, he perceives everything in full detail and remembers it all. He remembers, for example, the shape of clouds at all given moments, as well as the associated perceptions (muscular, thermal, etc.) of each moment. Funes has an immediate intuition of the mane of a horse or the form of a constantly changing flame that is comparable to our (normal people's) intuition of a simple geometric shape such as a triangle or square.

In order to pass the time, Funes has engaged in projects such as reconstructing a full day's worth of past memories (an effort which, he finds, takes him another full day), and constructing a "system of enumeration" that gives each number a different, arbitrary name. Borges correctly points out to him that this is precisely the opposite of a system of enumeration, but Funes might be incapable of such understanding. A poor, ignorant young boy in the outskirts of a small town, he is hopelessly limited in his possibilities, but (says Borges) his absurd projects reveal "a certain stammering greatness". Funes, we are told, is incapable of Platonic ideas, of generalities, of abstraction; his world is one of intolerably uncountable details. He finds it very difficult to sleep, since he recalls "every crevice and every moulding of the various houses which [surround] him".

Borges spends the whole night talking to Funes in the dark. When dawn reveals Funes's face, only 19 years old, Borges sees him "as monumental as bronze, more ancient than Egypt, anterior to the prophecies and the pyramids".

Borges later finds out that Funes died from "congestion of the lungs".

== Actual persons with similar conditions ==
Solomon Shereshevsky, a stage memory-artist (mnemonist) with a condition known as hypermnesia, is described by the Russian neuropsychologist Alexander Luria in his book, The Mind of a Mnemonist, which some speculate was the inspiration for Borges's story. Luria discusses explicitly some of the trade-offs—hinted at by Borges—that come with supernormal memory power. British-American neurologist and writer Oliver Sacks cites Luria's book as the inspiration for his own book Awakenings, which is dedicated to Luria. Sacks also mentions Borges's Funes in his book, The Man Who Mistook His Wife for a Hat, at the end of Chapter 13 entitled, "Yes, Father-Sister" and in other chapters. The neuroscience aspects of Funes are also discussed in detail by Rodrigo Quian Quiroga in his book Borges and Memory: Encounters with the Human Brain.

Jill Price, the actress Marilu Henner and a few others, can remember with great accuracy most days of their lives starting from the average age of eleven. The scientific term for their unique condition is "hyperthymestic syndrome", more recently known as highly superior autobiographical memory (HSAM). Price has stated that she, like Funes, views her memory as a curse.

== See also ==
- Eidetic memory
- Hyperthymesia
