= Hyperthymesia =

High-detailed autobiographical memory

- Other names: hyperthymestic syndrome, highly superior autobiographical memory (HSAM)
- Specialty: Psychology, psychiatry, neurology, neuropsychology

Hyperthymesia, also known as hyperthymestic syndrome or highly superior autobiographical memory (HSAM), is a condition that leads people to be able to remember an abnormally large number of their life experiences in vivid detail. It is extraordinarily rare, with fewer than 100 people in the world having been diagnosed with the condition as of 2021. A person who has hyperthymesia is called a hyperthymesiac.

American neurobiologists Elizabeth Parker, Larry Cahill and James McGaugh (2006) identified two defining characteristics of hyperthymesia: spending an excessive amount of time thinking about one's past, and displaying an extraordinary ability to recall specific events from one's past. The authors wrote that they derived the word from Ancient Greek: hyper- 'excessive' and allegedly thymesis 'remembering', although such a word is not attested in Ancient Greek but they may have been thinking of Modern Greek thymisi 'memory' or Ancient Greek enthymesis 'consideration', which are derived from thymos 'mind'.

The best-known, of the fewer than 100 known cases to be diagnosed with this condition, is American actress Marilu Henner.

== Signs and symptoms ==
Individuals with hyperthymesia can recall extensive details of their own lives, along with public events that hold personal significance. They often describe their memories as uncontrollable associations: when presented with a date, they immediately "see" a vivid depiction of that day without conscious effort. These memories are strikingly detailed but not literal recordings of experience.

In the case of Jill Price, anonymised as "AJ" in the 2006 study by Parker, Cahill and McGaugh, her recollections resembled a movie running in her mind, yet she could not remember incidental details such as what her interviewers were wearing hours earlier.

Although she describes her mind like having a movie running, she is not recording her world verbatim in its totality. One day after several hours together, she was asked to close her eyes and tell what her two interviewers were wearing. She was unable to do so.

Hyperthymesia differs from other forms of exceptional memory, which usually rely on mnemonic devices or rehearsal strategies. Hyperthymestic memories are overwhelmingly autobiographical, encompassing both significant and mundane events, and are encoded involuntarily and retrieved automatically. Although hyperthymesiacs may be able to recall the day of the week on which a date occurred, they are not calendrical calculators; their recall is constrained to lived experiences and thought to operate subconsciously.

Hyperthymesia is not classified as a form of autism, though certain similarities exist. Like autistic savants, some hyperthymesiacs develop an obsessive fascination with dates. Jill Price, the first documented case, differed notably from mnemonist Solomon Shereshevsky, described by psychologist Alexander Luria. Shereshevsky could deliberately memorise vast amounts of information, whereas Price could recall only autobiographical events and generally performed poorly at memorisation tasks. Hyperthymestic individuals may even have below-average memory for arbitrary information.

Another parallel drawn between Price and Shereshevsky is the role of synesthesia. Shereshevsky exemplified time-space synesthesia, and some researchers suggest superior autobiographical memory may be linked to this phenomenon.

=== Difficulties ===
Hyperthymestic abilities can have a detrimental effect. The constant, irrepressible stream of memories has caused significant disruption to Price's life. She described her recollection as "non-stop, uncontrollable and totally exhausting" and as "a burden". Price is prone to getting lost in remembering. This can make it difficult to attend to the present or future, as she is often spending time re-living the past.

Price displays considerable difficulty in memorising allocentric information. According to James McGaugh, "Her autobiographical memory, while incredible, is also selective and even ordinary in some respects". This was demonstrated by her having poor performance on standardised memory tests and average performance at school, unable to apply her exceptional memory to her studies.

Deficits in executive functioning and anomalous lateralisation were also identified in Price. These cognitive deficiencies are characteristic of frontostriatal disorders.

Even those with a high level of hyperthymesia do not remember exactly everything in their lives or have "perfect memory". Studies have shown that it is a selective ability, as shown by Price's case, and they can have comparative difficulty with rote memorisation and therefore cannot apply their ability to school and work.

Their memorisation of events tends to exceed their ability to memorise given facts; for example, if a hyperthymesiac were told a fact, he might forget the fact even while remembering the teller's clothing and other aspects of the situation, making the memories even more potent.

Hyperthymesiacs also have difficulties letting go of difficult events or traumatic memories, which can stay with them for life. Joey DeGrandis, who was featured in the magazine Time said, "I do tend to dwell on things longer than the average person, and when something painful does happen, like a break-up or the loss of a family member, I don't forget those feelings."

Cases of hyperthymesia have forced many people to re-evaluate what is meant by "healthy" memory: "it isn't just about retaining the significant stuff. Far more important is being able to forget the rest."

== Causes ==
Due to the small number of people diagnosed with hyperthymesia (fewer than 100 known cases), relatively little is known about the processes governing this superior memory ability. However, more is beginning to be understood about this condition.

=== Psychological ===
It has been proposed that the initial encoding of events by such people includes semantic processing, and therefore semantic cues are used in retrieval. Once cued, the memory is retrieved as episodic and follows a pattern similar to that of a spreading activation model. This is particularly evident in Jill Price's case. She describes how one memory triggers another, which in turn triggers another and how she is powerless to stop it: "It's like a split screen; I'll be talking to someone and seeing something else." This theory serves to explain why hyperthymestics have both a sense of 'knowing' (semantic memory) and 'remembering' (episodic memory) during recollection.

One writer claimed hyperthymesia may be a result of reviewing memories constantly to an obsessive-compulsive degree. However, Price has completely dismissed this article as "a load of crap", and hyperthymesiacs claim to never revisit uneventful memories.

Other findings have shown that the tendencies to absorb new information and fantasise are personality traits that are higher in hyperthymestics than the rest of the population. These traits, absorption and fantasising, also correlated with a test which measures superior autobiographical memory within the hyperthymestic sample.

McGaugh rejects the idea that hyperthymestic syndrome can be explained away so easily; he argues that nothing explains how subjects are able to memorise so much: "You'd have to assume that every day they rehearse it... The probability of these explanations dwindles as you look at the evidence."

=== Biological ===
An MRI study conducted on Price provides a plausible argument as to the neurological foundation of her superior memory. Both the temporal lobe and the caudate nucleus were found to be enlarged.

Parker and colleagues speculated that a defective frontostriatal circuit could be responsible for the observed executive function deficits in hyperthymesia. This circuit plays a crucial role in some neurodevelopmental disorders including obsessive–compulsive disorder and Alzheimer's. Given the parallels in some aspects of behavior, Price's hyperthymestic abilities possibly stem from atypical neurodevelopment. Scientists now need to ascertain if and how these brain areas are connected to establish a coherent neurological model for superior autobiographical memory.

For autobiographical memory, the hippocampus, located in the medial temporal lobe, is involved in the encoding of declarative memory (memory for facts and events), while the temporal cortex is involved in the storage of such memory. The caudate nucleus is primarily associated with procedural memory, in particular habit formation, and is, therefore, intrinsically linked to obsessive-compulsive disorder.

A 2018 clinical trial published that there were higher levels of activation in the medial prefrontal cortex and temporoparietal junction along with heightened connection between the prefrontal cortex and the hippocampus in hyperthymesiacs, suggesting that these regions may play a role in the enablement of the condition. This contradicts information published earlier in a Wired article, which states that the hyperthymesiac Jill Price had been brain scanned and her "hippocampus and prefrontal cortex were reportedly normal", suggesting that these regions of the brain do not need to be different for hyperthymesia to occur.

Significant debate also exists over the limits of memory capacity. Some are of the view that the brain contains so many potential synaptic connections that, in theory at least, no practical limit exists to the number of long-term memories that the brain can store. In 1961, Wilder Penfield reported that specific stimulation of the temporal lobes resulted in vivid recollection of memories. He concluded that our brains were making "continuous, effortless, video-like recordings" of our experiences, but that these records are not consciously accessible to us. However, a study published in the Proceedings of the National Academy of Sciences suggested that hyperthymesiacs may reconstruct memories from traces and incorporate post-event information and associations—a finding at odds with Penfield's video-like recording analogy.

== Diagnosis ==
Parker and colleagues used a variety of standardised neuropsychological tests in their diagnosis of Price's hyperthymesia. These included tests of memory, lateralisation, executive functions, language, calculations, IQ, and visual-spatial and visual-motor functions. They also devised novel tests to examine the extent of her memory abilities. These mostly consisted of questions pertaining to specific dates and events in history. Some of her personal recollections were verified with diary entries, as well as by her mother.

Neuroscientist David Eagleman at Stanford University developed a free online test for hyperthymesia (no longer available). Participants first give their year of birth, and then are challenged to match dates to 60 famous events that happened between the time they were five years old and the present day. To qualify as potentially hyperthymestic, participants must achieve a score at least three standard deviations above the average. To prevent people from searching for answers on-line during the test, reaction time for each question is measured; answers must be chosen within 11 seconds to qualify for consideration. However, many of the questions are sourced in American culture and test results could have a strong cultural bias against non-Americans.

== Society and culture ==
=== Notable cases ===
As of April 2016, six hyperthymesia cases have been confirmed in peer-reviewed articles, the first being that of Jill Price (initially anonymised as "AJ") in 2006. More cases had been identified by 2012, but are yet to be published. Price's case was originally reported by researchers from the University of California, Irvine, Elizabeth Parker, Larry Cahill and James McGaugh, and is credited as being the first documented case of hyperthymesia. Price can apparently recall every day of her life from when she was 14 years old: "Starting on February 5, 1980, I remember everything. That was a Tuesday."

In March 2009, Price was interviewed for an article in Wired magazine by Gary Marcus, a cognitive psychologist at New York University. Price's brain had been subject to a brain scan and the hippocampus and prefrontal cortex had been reportedly normal. Marcus claimed, however, that her brain resembled "those of people with obsessive-compulsive disorder" and suggested that her remarkable memory might be "the byproduct of obsession", claiming also that "the memory woman clings tightly to her past". Price strongly disputed this and McGaugh has also challenged the explanation. Price gave her first interview in over a year for the UK's Channel 4 documentary The Boy Who Can't Forget, and spoke of the challenges of living with the condition.

K. Anders Ericsson of Florida State University did not believe that sufficient evidence existed to suggest that the skills of Price and another documented case, Brad Williams, needed additional explanation: "Our work has pretty much concluded that differences in memory don't seem to be the result of innate differences, but more the kinds of skills that are developed."

As the condition has become better known, more people claiming to have hyperthymestic abilities have emerged. In the aftermath of the 2006 Neurocase publication alone, more than 200 people contacted McGaugh; however, only a handful of cases were determined to be actual cases of hyperthymesia. The second verified case was Brad Williams, the third was Rick Baron, and in 2009, Bob Petrella became the fourth person diagnosed with hyperthymestic syndrome.

The U.S. television program 60 Minutes featured actress Marilu Henner in 2010 for her superior autobiographical memory ability. Henner claimed to remember almost every day of her life since age 11. The show was initially pitched as a story featuring hyperthymestic violinist Louise Owen, but the reporter Lesley Stahl volunteered her friend Henner as having a similar ability.

In 2012, reports emerged of H.K. Derryberry, a blind 20-year-old man who could clearly recall every day of the last nine years of his life. Derryberry had been born at 27 weeks, weighing just over 2 pounds (0.91 kg) and was in neonatal intensive care for 96 days. A brain hemorrhage was the likely cause of cerebral palsy, and his premature birth brought congenital blindness. He told researchers that his memories are rich in detail, regardless of whether they are from years ago or yesterday. About 90% of his memories are in the first person, compared with an average of 66% in the general population. A team at Vanderbilt University conducted a series of tests including a brain scan that was compared with 30 age-matched controls. His brain was smaller than average (probably a result of his birth at 27 weeks). His right amygdala, however, was 20% larger, with enhanced functional connectivity between the right amygdala and hippocampus and in other regions. In 2016 HK's story was published, The Awakening of HK Derryberry: My Unlikely Friendship with the Boy Who Remembers Everything, written by his mentor Jim Bradford.

In the same year, UK's Channel 4 screened the documentary The Boy Who Can't Forget, which examined the memory of 20-year-old Aurelien Hayman from Cardiff, a student at Durham University, who remembers practically every day of his life from the age of 10. The first British person to be identified with this ability, Hayman views it positively. When Hayman's brain was scanned by a team led by Professor Giuliana Mazzoni at the University of Hull, whilst he was prompted to remember a series of dates, a series of "visual areas" of the brain were activated, with much greater speed than would be expected in normal brain function. Potential problems with total recall were illustrated. The documentary also featured Bob Petrella, whose memory has enabled him to catalogue the events from his "favorite days" into a large scrapbook.

In March 2015, Markie Pasternak of Green Bay, Wisconsin, was diagnosed as the youngest person to be living with HSAM. Born in 1994, Pasternak remembers every day of her life since February 2005. She was featured on 60 Minutes Australia in August 2016 with Rebecca Sharrock.

In January 2016, painter and polymath Nima Veiseh was featured by the BBC for his use of hyperthymesia to create paintings that were said to only be producible with vast memories of art pieces, although a paper published in the journal Memory in 2022 claimed that having hyperthymesia does not increase one's creative thinking. Veiseh claimed to remember almost every day of his life since he was 15 years old, and that his ability to synthesise time and an "encyclopedic knowledge of the history of art" enabled him to create wholly unique visions on canvas. In March 2016 NPR examined further Veiseh's exploration of time and the human experience through art.

In 2017, Australian Rebecca Sharrock of Brisbane became known as a person who claims to recall even circumstantial details of every day of her life from her 12th day of life onward. Discussing her hyperthymesia with BBC World Service, Sharrock revealed she was supporting two research projects – one with the University of Queensland and another with the University of California – to understand how a greater knowledge of hyperthymesia can support Alzheimer's disease research, particularly in repairing the degeneration of the hippocampus. Scans conducted during the studies showed that Sharrock's brain exhibited a heightened connection between the conscious and sub-conscious parts of her brain, which may aid easier memory recall – in particular for events that took place earlier in life.

In December 2017, a man named Joey DeGrandis was verified as having HSAM by James McGaugh and subsequently featured in an article in Time magazine. DeGrandis also reports having poor short-term memory, indicating that HSAM does not necessarily improve one's short-term memory abilities.

A 63-year-old man, anonymised as "The Amazing Memory Man" (MM) was featured in a paper by Neuropsychology in March 2018, where it is reported that he "appreciates that his memory for personally experienced life events and general knowledge are both exceptional, whereas his imaging the future is only average" (after scoring 123 on Episodic, 123 on Semantic, 112 on Spatial, and 91 on Future remembering memory types, all with a mean of 100).

In October 2018, it was reported that teenager Tyler Hickenbottom, who is an identical twin, had the condition, which allowed him to "remember every day of his life like it was yesterday".

Tim Rogers, an American video game developer and journalist, claims to experience the condition in several of his published works.

John Romero, a video game developer and co-founder of id Software, has often said he has hyperthymesia, including in his 2023 autobiography, Doom Guy: Life in First Person.

In 2024, Emily Nash, an 18-year-old high school student with HSAM, was featured in a CTV W5 story.

The best-known, of the fewer than 100 known cases to be diagnosed with this condition, is American actress, singer, dancer, and author Marilu Henner.

=== Fiction ===
==== Books ====
- In the 1942 short story "Funes the Memorious" by Jorge Luis Borges, the protagonist suffers a head injury after which he gains the ability to remember every detail of what he experiences, but comes to view this as a curse.
- In the 1980 series The Book of the New Sun by Gene Wolfe, the protagonist remembers everything he has ever seen starting from infancy. He describes his memories as being so vivid that he is capable of re-living anything he has experienced whenever he chooses to do so.
- In a 2011 manga by Kohske called Gangsta, the main character, Worick Arcangelo, is said to have hyperthymesia, which he uses to help police identify murder victims.
- In the 2015 novel Memory Man by David Baldacci, the protagonist, Amos Decker, has hyperthymesia. In the book, a mystery-crime scene-thriller with graphic scenes, Decker uses his perfect memory brought on by a traumatic hit in football to solve the murder of his wife and child, and the school shooting connected to it. Decker recalls his memories as a "DVR", just playing when it wants to, or being rewound and played forward by conscious thought.
- In the 2021 romantic suspense series Memento Mori by C.S. Poe, the protagonist, Everett Larkin, has hyperthymesia. Larkin suffered a traumatic brain injury at the age of 18, leaving him with highly superior autobiographical memory (HSAM) but very poor short-term memory. He remembers events since his injury with perfect recall, and memories are often brought to the surface through "associations." Larkin uses his superior memory as a detective on the NYPD cold case squad.
- In the 2025 speculative fiction novel The Strange Case of Jane O. by Karen Thompson Walker, a New York City psychiatrist treats a hyperthymestic woman who has mysterious blackouts and hallucinations.
- In the 2025 romance novel The Survivor Wants to Die at the End by Adam Silvera, one of the protagonists, Alano Rosa, has hyperthymesia and can remember even before he was born. He relives every moment he remembers including feelings, which in some instances cause him physical pain.

==== Film and television ====
- In season 7 episode 12 of the series House, M.D. is about a patient who has a temporary paralysis and creatine kinase. She has a "perfect memory" due to her hyperthymesia. It later concludes her hyperthymesia is the way her OCD presents and that taking SSRI to treat her OCD will dial down her hyperthymesia.
- In the 2014 film The Dark Place, the protagonist of the story, Keegan Dark, has hyperthymesia. Keegan uses it to solve the mystery at the heart of the story. His hyperthymesia memories are visually depicted in the movie as "screens" appearing to Keegan, often in an overwhelming and distressing manner.
- In season 2 episode 2 of the TV show The Blacklist a character involved in criminal banking enterprises identified herself as having hyperthymesia as a skillful trait to avoid leaving a paper trail for illegal activities. She provided the FBI agents in the episode with real examples by recitation of events of dates selected at random. Her skills seemed to be date oriented rather than triggered by "personal experience."
- Unforgettable (American TV series)
- The 2015 South Korean TV series Remember: War of the Son portrays a hyperthymestic lawyer who sought to prove the innocence of his father, who had been convicted and sentenced to death for the brutal rape-murder of a neighbour.
- The 2020 South Korean TV series Find Me in Your Memory portrays the love story between a hyperthymestic news anchorman and an actress with amnesia, connected by a past traumatic event.
- In the TV series Superstore, one of the characters, Sandra, has highly superior autobiographical memory, which occasionally ties into the plot.
- In season 5 of the Canadian TV series Flashpoint, a hyperthymestic man is abducted in order to steal the plans to a smart weapon system at a secure facility.
- In the Indian crime thriller film Maargan (2025), the character Tamilarivu has hyperthymesia.

== See also ==
- Daniel McCartney
- Hypermnesia
- Savant syndrome
