= Tony Rayns =

British writer (1948–2026)

- Rayns in 2006
- Born: Antony Keith Graham Rayns; 20 September 1948; Oxford, England
- Died: July 2026 (aged 77); London, England
- Occupations: Writer; commentator; screenwriter

Antony Keith Graham Rayns (20 September 1948 – 2026) was a British writer, commentator, film festival programmer and screenwriter. He wrote for the underground publication Cinema Rising before contributing to the Monthly Film Bulletin from the December 1970. He contributed writings to Sight & Sound from the 1970s, and also contributed to Time Out, Melody Maker, and Film Comment.

== Life and career ==
Rayns was born on 20 September 1948 in Oxford. His parents, Donald and Zelma Rayns (née Osmond-Jones), operated a photography studio. Rayns was the eldest of two other siblings, Stephanie and Nicholas. After his father found a position as a grocery executive, Rayns' family moved to Norwich. He received a scholarship to the University of Cambridge, where he studied English. Rayns became a film enthusiast after joining a society at his secondary school.

From 1988 to 2006, Rayns ran the Dragons and Tigers competition. This was an event that spotlighted Asian films at the Vancouver International Film Festival. Rayns served on festival juries in Cannes Film Festival, Sapporo, San Sebastian, San Francisco, Vladivstok and Beijing.

Rayns provided commentary tracks for DVD releases of Asian films. He coordinated the Dragons and Tigers competition for Asian films at the Vancouver International Film Festival from 1988 to 2006. In the 1980s, he presented a series called New Chinese Cinema on British television, showing (sometimes rare) films and biographies of eminent Chinese directors. He also worked as a translator for English subtitles on films from Hong Kong, Japan, Korea, Taiwan and Thailand. For example, he wrote the English subtitles for the films of Huang Ming-chuan in the 1990s in Taiwan. For his global advocacy of Japanese cinema, Rayns was awarded the Kawakita Prize in 2004, and the Foreign Ministry of Japan's Commendation in 2008.

He wrote the screenplay for Away with Words, a feature film directed by cinematographer Christopher Doyle, starring Asano Tadanobu. He has written books about Seijun Suzuki, Wong Kar-wai and Rainer Werner Fassbinder. In the 1970s, he began a book on Kenji Mizoguchi, which he had not completed at the time he recorded audio commentary for the Criterion Collection DVD release of Ugetsu in 2005. In 2000, he began writing and directing The Jang Sun-woo Variations (장선우 변주곡, 2001), a documentary film on South Korean director Jang Sun-woo.

Rayns died at his home in London in July 2026, after a fall down his stairs. According to his sister, his body was discovered on 7 July.

== Legacy ==
Rayns is remembered for being an influential advocate of East Asian cinema who helped introduce many prominent Asian film directors to Western audiences.

== Works ==
=== Documentary film ===
- The Jang Sun-woo Variations (장선우 변주곡, 2001) – Director, writer

=== DVD commentary tracks ===
- Accattone – Masters of Cinema
- Akasen Chitai – Masters of Cinema
- A Brighter Summer Day – The Criterion Collection
- An Actor's Revenge – British Film Institute (BFI)
- Berlin Alexanderplatz – Second Sight Films
- Chungking Express – The Criterion Collection
- Daughter of the Nile – Cohen Film Collection
- Eastern Condors – The Criterion Collection
- The Face of Another – Masters of Cinema
- The Fate of Lee Khan – Masters of Cinema
- The Host – Magnolia Home Entertainment, with director Bong Joon Ho
- In the Realm of the Senses – The Criterion Collection
- Manila in the Claws of Light – The Criterion Collection
- Memories of Murder – The Criterion Collection
- Mouchette – The Criterion Collection
- Parasite – The Criterion Collection, with director Bong Joon Ho
- Pitfall – Masters of Cinema
- Seven Samurai – The Criterion Collection, with film scholars David Desser, Joan Mellen, Stephen Prince and Donald Richie
- Still Life – BFI
- Ugetsu – The Criterion Collection
- Vampyr – Masters of Cinema 2008 release, which was subsequently licensed to The Criterion Collection for their edition
- Vengeance Is Mine – Masters of Cinema
- Veronika Voss – The Criterion Collection
- Yi Yi – The Criterion Collection, with director Edward Yang
- Sansho Dayu – Masters of Cinema
- Zu: Warriors from the Magic Mountain – Masters of Cinema
