= Giuliana Mazzoni =

Italian psychologist, researcher

- Occupations: Psychologist, researcher and academic

Academic background
- Education: University of Padua (PhD)

Academic work
- Discipline: Psychology
- Sub-discipline: Cognitive psychology, forensic psychology, memory research

Giuliana Mazzoni is an Italian psychologist, researcher and academic specializing in cognitive psychology, memory, and forensic psychology.

== Academic career ==
Mazzoni received her PhD from the University of Padua. She subsequently undertook postdoctoral research at the University of Washington in the United States. She then worked as an assistant professor at the University of Florence and as an associate professor at the University of Calabria. In 2000, she was appointed full professor in Italy. She later held academic positions at Seton Hall University in the United States, the University of Plymouth in the United Kingdom, and the University of Hull, where she served as Professor and Chair of Psychology. In the 2018–2019 academic year, she was appointed full professor at Sapienza University of Rome.

== Research ==
Mazzoni's research focuses primarily on false memories, autobiographical memory, suggestibility, and eyewitness testimony. Her work has examined how imagination, suggestion, hypnosis, and social influence can affect the formation and retrieval of memories. She is widely known for studies demonstrating that imagining an event can increase the likelihood that individuals will later report remembering that event as having actually occurred. This research contributed to the understanding of memory as a reconstructive process rather than a literal reproduction of past experiences.

Mazzoni has also conducted research on hyperthymesia (HSAM). Her research has examined the cognitive and neural mechanisms underlying HSAM and compared individuals with superior autobiographical memory with people with typical memory abilities. According to a BBC News report published in 2011, Mazzoni led a study at the University of Hull aimed at identifying individuals in the United Kingdom with HSAM, a rare condition characterized by an exceptional ability to recall autobiographical events in extraordinary detail. In 2012, Channel 4 reported that she examined a British individual with HSAM as part of an investigation into the cognitive and neurological basis of exceptional autobiographical memory for the documentary The Boy Can't Forget.

Mazzoni has also written about the relationship between memory and personal identity. In her 2018 article, The ‘real you’ is a myth: we constantly create false memories to achieve the identity we want, originally published by The Conversation and subsequently republished by outlets including Newsweek and the Irish Examiner, she discussed the reconstructive nature of autobiographical memory and the role of memory in shaping personal identity. She examined how false and no-longer-believed memories can influence the construction of personal narratives.

Her work has also addressed memory, deception, and eyewitness testimony. In a 2019 interview with El País, Mazzoni discussed the relationship between memory and lying, as well as the effects of suggestion and questioning techniques on eyewitnes testimony. She emphasized the importance of distinguishng between deliberate deception and errors arising from memory distortion. Her views on the relationship between memory and deception were subsequently referenced in a 2025 El País opinion article concerning the DANA, which discussed the role of memory in maintaining consistency in fabricated accounts.

Mazzoni has also given talks at TEDx events, including TEDxHull, TEDxPavia, and TEDxSapienzaU, where she discussed topics related to psychology, memory, and her research.

== Selected publications ==
- Mazzoni, Giuliana; Cornoldi, Cesare (1993–03). "Strategies in study time allocation: Why is study time sometimes not effective?". Journal of Experimental Psychology: General. 122 (1): 47–60. doi:10.1037/0096-3445.122.1.47. ISSN 1939-2222.
- Mazzoni, Giuliana; Loftus, Elizabeth F.; Kirsch, Irving (2001). "Changing beliefs about implausible autobiographical events: A little plausibility goes a long way". Journal of Experimental Psychology: Applied. 7 (1): 51–59. doi:10.1037/1076-898X.7.1.51. ISSN 1939-2192
- Mazzoni, Giuliana; Kirsh, Irving (2002), "Autobiographical memories and beliefs: a preliminary metacognitive model", Cambridge University Press, pp. 121–145, doi:10.1017/CBO9780511489976.007, ISBN 978-0-521-00037-6.
- Mazzoni, Giuliana; Memon, Amina (2003-03-01). "Imagination Can Create False Autobiographical Memories". Psychological Science. 14 (2): 186–188. doi:10.1046/j.1432-1327.1999.00020.x. ISSN 0956-7976.
- Mazzoni, Giuliana; Scoboria, Alan; Harvey, Lucy (2010-09-01). "Nonbelieved Memories". Psychological Science. 21 (9): 1334–1340. doi:10.1177/0956797610379865. ISSN 0956-7976.
