= Mazzone =

Mazzone is a surname. Notable people with the surname include:

- A. David Mazzone (1928–2004), American lawyer
- Adolfo Mazzone (1914–2001), Argentine comics artist
- Carlo Mazzone (1937–2023), Italian football manager
- Dora Mazzone (born 1967), Venezuelan actress
- Jason Mazzone (born 1970), American legal scholar
- Juan Rosario Mazzone, Argentine politician
- Leo Mazzone (born 1948), American baseball pitcher
- Luca Mazzone (born 1971), Italian swimmer and cyclist
- Natasha Mazzone (born 1979), South African politician
- Noel Mazzone (born 1957), American football player and coach
- Steven Mazzone (born 1964), American mobster
