= Torquato Mazzoni =

Italian painter

Torquato Mazzoni (1824 - after 1869) was an Italian painter.

== Life and career ==
He studied in the Academy of Fine Arts in Florence under Giuseppe Bezzuoli, and painted in Montepulciano.
