= Kim Peek =

American savant (1951–2009)

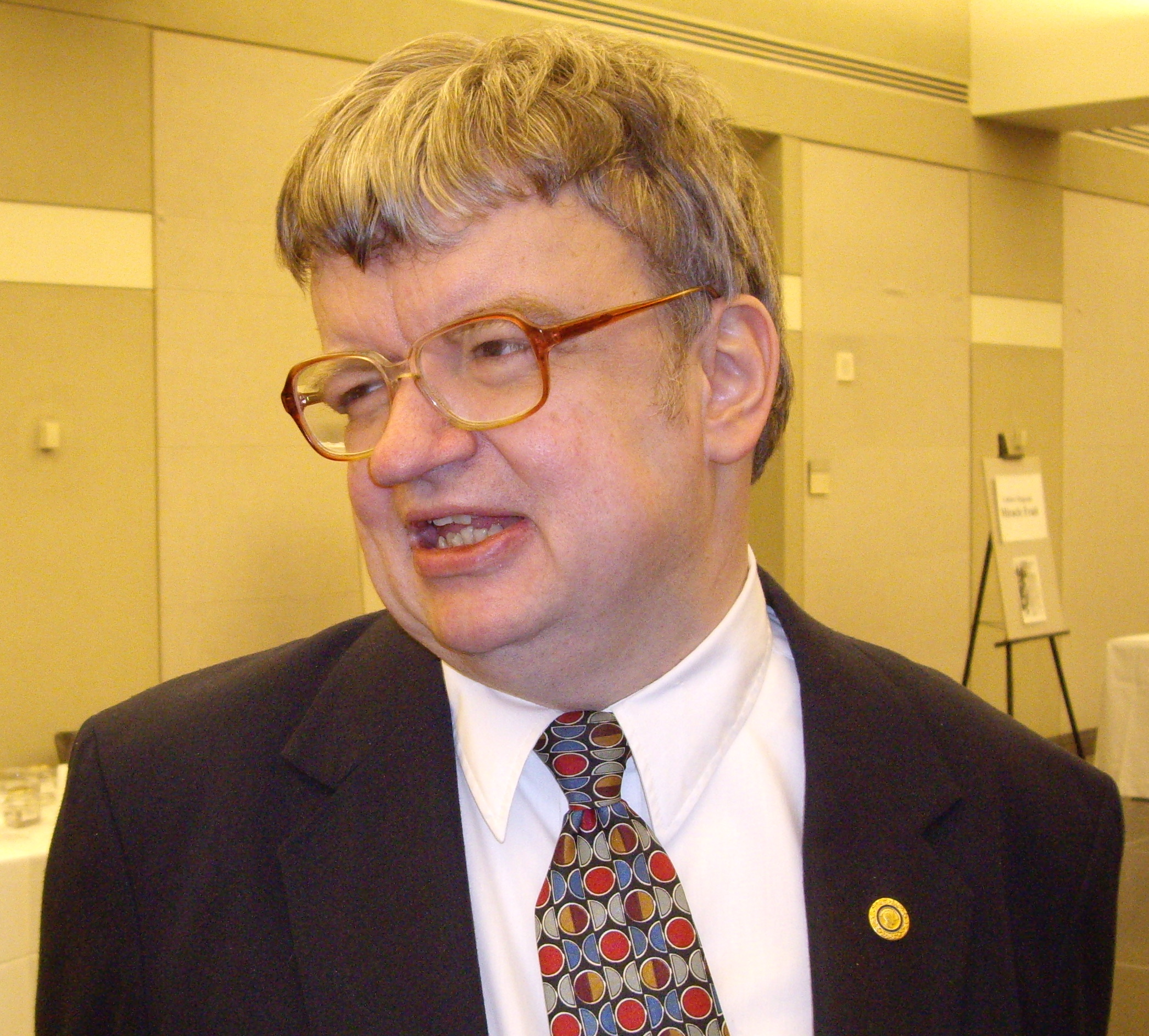
- Peek in 2007
- Born: Laurence Kim Peek; November 11, 1951; Salt Lake City, Utah, U.S.
- Died: December 19, 2009 (aged 58); Murray, Utah, U.S.

Laurence Kim Peek (November 11, 1951 – December 19, 2009) was an American savant. Known as a "megasavant", he had an exceptional memory and exceptional intelligence, but he also experienced social difficulties, possibly resulting from a developmental disability related to congenital brain abnormalities. He was the inspiration for the character Raymond Babbitt in the 1988 movie Rain Man. Although Peek was previously diagnosed with autism, he is now thought to have had FG syndrome.

== Early life, family and education ==
Laurence Kim Peek was born in Salt Lake City, Utah, to Francis "Fran" Peek and Jeanne W. Buchi. He had two siblings: a brother and a sister. Kim was diagnosed with macrocephaly, damage to the cerebellum, and agenesis of the corpus callosum, a condition in which the nerves that connect the two hemispheres of the brain are missing; in Peek's case, secondary connectors, such as the anterior commissure, were also missing. There is speculation that his neurons had made unusual connections due to the absence of the corpus callosum, resulting in an increased memory capacity. When he was 9 months old, Kim was designated "retarded" and was recommended to be institutionalized; his parents refused this suggestion and raised him at home.

According to his father, Kim was able to memorize information from the age of 16 to 20 months, reading books and memorizing them before placing them upside-down on his bookshelf to show that he had finished—a habit he maintained all his life. He could speed through an entire book in about an hour and remember almost everything he had read, memorizing vast amounts of information on subjects ranging from "history and literature, geography and numbers to sports, music and dates". Peek read by scanning the left page with his left eye, while reading the right page with his right eye. According to an article in The Times, he could accurately recall the contents of at least 12,000 books. Peek resided in Murray, Utah, and spent a considerable amount of his time reading at the Salt Lake City Library (about 9 mi (14 km) away).

Although displaying significant mental abilities and deficits, Peek did not walk until he was four years old, and even then in a sidelong manner; he could not button a shirt, and had difficulty with other ordinary motor skills (presumably due to his damaged cerebellum, which normally coordinates motor activities). During psychological evaluations, Peek yielded superior ability in the performance sub-tests and limited ability in the verbal sub-tests, leading his overall IQ of 87 not to be considered a valid measure of his cognitive ability. At age 7, Kim attended school, but he was subsequently tutored privately; by age 14 he had completed a high school curriculum, but the local school system would not recognize his achievement. Fran Peek did not fully appreciate his son's talents until 1979, when Peek accurately predicted that the plummeting Skylab space station would land near Perth, Western Australia.

== Activity before and after Rain Man ==
During his adult life, Peek attended the Columbus Center, earning $40 a week completing payrolls for 86 employees of the Salt Lake City School District. In 1984, screenwriter Barry Morrow met Peek in Arlington, Texas. Morrow was so impressed by Peek and his abilities that Morrow determined to write a feature film centered on a character like Kim. The result was the 1988 Academy Award-winning feature film Rain Man. The character of Raymond Babbitt, inspired by Peek, was depicted as being a person with autism. Dustin Hoffman, who portrayed Babbitt in the film, met Peek and other individuals that displayed savant mannerisms, studying their characteristics and nature in order to play the role as accurately as possible.

The movie led to many requests for appearances, both in-person and on television, which increased Peek's self-confidence. Barry Morrow gave Peek his Oscar statuette to carry with him and show at these appearances; it has since been referred to as the "Most Loved Oscar Statue" because it has been held by more people than any other. Peek also enjoyed approaching strangers and showing them his talent for calendar calculations by telling them on which day of the week they were born and what news items were on the front page of major newspapers that day. After gaining fame as a savant, Peek toured and demonstrated his abilities, often visiting schools, traveling with and assisted by his father who cared for and managed him, performing motor tasks that Kim found difficult.

== Scientific investigation ==
In 2004, scientists at the Center for Bioinformatics Space Life Sciences at the NASA Ames Research Center examined Peek with a series of tests including computed tomography (CT scan) and magnetic resonance imaging (MRI). The intent was to create a three-dimensional view of his brain structure and to compare the images to MRI scans performed in 1988. These were the first tentative approaches in using non-invasive technology to further investigate Kim's savant abilities.

A 2008 study concluded that Peek probably had FG syndrome, a rare X chromosome-linked genetic syndrome that causes physical anomalies such as hypotonia (low muscle tone) and macrocephaly (abnormally large head).

== Personal life and death ==
Peek resided with his father Francis "Fran" Peek in Murray, Utah, although they often traveled for appearances after Kim's fame rose after Rain Man. Kim's parents divorced in 1975, resulting in Fran being Kim's sole caregiver. Fran functioned as Kim's facilitator, traveling companion, and manager, caring for Kim's needs such as performing motor tasks which were difficult for Kim to perform.

Kim Peek died of a heart attack at his home on December 19, 2009, aged 58.

== Legacy ==
Barry Morrow put his own Oscar statuette on permanent loan to Salt Lake City in memory of Kim Peek and put forward the money for the Peek Award, which "pays tribute to artists, media makers, and film subjects who are positively impacting our society's perception of people with disabilities" and is given out by the Utah Film Center.

== Appearances ==
- The Boy with the Incredible Brain, a BBC documentary
- Brainman, a Discovery Channel documentary
- Inside the Rain Man, a Discovery Channel documentary
- Everything You Need to Know – The Brain, a Discovery Channel documentary
- Human Computer, a Discovery Channel documentary
- Medical Incredible, a Discovery Health Channel documentary
- The Real Rain Man, a Discovery Health Channel documentary; premiered on November 26, 2006
- Ripley's Believe It or Not!
- CNN interview by Richard Quest
- "The Real Rain Man", a 2006 episode of RTL Group's Extraordinary People
- World's Smartest People, The Learning Channel
- Kim and his father were speakers at the inaugural meeting of the Athanasius Kircher Society on January 16, 2007.
- Speaker at the Oxford Union
- 60 Minutes
- Accidental Genius, a National Geographic Channel documentary
- "Genius", an episode of Superhuman, Science Channel; premiered November 7, 2008
- Den Riktiga Rain Man (The Real Rain Man), a Swedish documentary; broadcast July 6, 2006 on Sweden's TV4
- Michael Vey 4
