= Jill Price =

American hyperthymesiac author (born 1965)

Jill Price (née Rosenberg, born December 30, 1965) is an American author from Southern California, who has been diagnosed with hyperthymesia. She was the first person to receive such a diagnosis, and it was her case that inspired research into hyperthymesia. She has co-authored a book on the subject.

== Abilities ==
Price is able to recite details of every day of her life from the time when she was fourteen years old. She can recall various obscure moments of her life in great detail. Her condition, termed hyperthymesia, or "hyperthymestic syndrome", is characterized by a highly superior autobiographical memory.

Her case was originally researched by a team at the University of California, Irvine: Elizabeth Parker; Larry Cahill; and James McGaugh. Originally anonymised as "AJ", Price was described as being able to recall every day of her life from when she was 14 years old: "Starting on February 5th, 1980, I remember everything. That was a Tuesday." The first report on the study of her brain was published in 2006. In 2008, with Bart Davis, she wrote the book The Woman Who Can't Forget, explaining her life with the condition. The book has meant her to become well known internationally, leading to a demand in public appearances.

Price's brain was subject to a brain scan and the hippocampus and prefrontal cortex were reportedly normal. It was claimed by research psychologist Gary Marcus, however, that her brain resembled those of people with obsessive compulsive disorder (OCD). Based upon tests he performed on her as well as personal observations, Marcus has speculated that her unusual autobiographical memory is actually a byproduct of compulsively making journal and diary entries. Price has since reacted angrily to such claims and McGaugh has also expressed skepticism for such an explanation. In September 2012, Price gave her first interview in over a year for the UK's Channel 4 documentary The Boy Who Can't Forget and provided an insight into just how difficult life can be for people who have this condition.

Research scientist Julia Simner, now at the University of Sussex, has speculated that her abilities are intimately tied to her visualizations of time in space, a form of synesthesia.

Due to her condition, Price resides with her parents Harrison Harvey and Stacy Price.

== Published works ==
Price, J. and Davis, B. 2008, The Woman Who Can't Forget: The Extraordinary Story of Living with the Most Remarkable Memory Known to Science—A Memoir, Free Press, ISBN 1-416-5617-65
