= Spontaneous recovery =

Re-emergence of a previously extinguished conditioned response

Spontaneous recovery is a medical phenomenon of learning and memory. This phenomenon was first coined and described by Ivan Pavlov in his studies of classical (Pavlovian) conditioning. In that context, it refers to the re-emergence of a previously extinguished conditioned response after a delay. The recovery of such lost behaviors can be observed in a variety of contexts, and the recovery of forgotten human memories is often of particular interest.

== In classical conditioning ==
Spontaneous recovery is associated with classical conditioning, a learning process in which an organism learns to associate a neutral stimulus with a stimulus that produces an unconditioned response. As a result, the previously neutral stimulus comes to produce its own response, which is usually similar to that produced by the unconditioned stimulus. Although aspects of classical conditioning had been noted by previous scholars, the first experimental analysis of the process was conducted by Ivan Pavlov, a nineteenth-century physiologist who came across the associative effects of conditioning while researching canine digestion.

To study digestion, Pavlov presented various types of food to dogs and measured their salivary response. He noticed that with repeated testing, the dogs began to salivate before the food was presented, such as when they heard the footsteps of an approaching experimenter. Pavlov named this anticipatory behavior the "conditioned" response. He and his associates discovered and published the basic facts about this process, which has come to be known as classical or Pavlovian conditioning.

Among the phenomena that Pavlov observed was the partial recovery of a classically conditioned response after it had been extinguished by withholding the unconditioned stimulus. This recovery happened without any further unconditioned stimulation, and Pavlov referred to it as spontaneous recovery. Although the chance of spontaneous recovery increases with time following the extinction procedure, such conditioned responses generally do not return to full strength. Moreover, with repeated recovery/extinction cycles, the conditioned response tends to be less intense with each period of recovery. However, reconditioning by pairing the same conditioned and unconditioned stimuli usually occurs much faster than the original conditioning.

A key conclusion is that conditioning leaves a lasting trace in the organism's memory, and that extinction does not erase the original conditioning but merely suppresses it. This insight has had profound implications for theories of classical conditioning and practical applications, particularly in behavioral therapy.

== In human memory ==
=== Retroactive interference ===
Spontaneous recovery as it pertains to human memory can be traced back to the work of George Edward Briggs, who was concerned with the concept of retroactive interference. Inhibition, or interference, is a function of competition among responses, whereby one memory has dominance over another. The inhibited responses are not lost from memory per se, but are kept from appearing by other responses.

Retroactive interference is the psychological theory of memory whereby learning something new impedes retrieval of a previously learned memory. Briggs studied retroactive interference using a test of free recall. In his study, participants learned paired associate words (i.e. A_{1}-B_{1}, A_{2}-B_{2},...A_{i}-B_{i}) over multiple trials, until the learning of the A_{i}-B_{i} associates was perfected. Following this, participants were given a new list of paired associates, where the second word of the pair was changed while the first word of the associate pair was kept the same (A_{1}-C_{1}, A_{2}-C_{2},... A_{i}-C_{i}). After mastery of this second list, Briggs had participants perform a recall procedure. He presented a list A item and asked the participant to recall whichever pair (the -B_{i} or –C_{i}) that came to mind. Based on retroactive interference, learning of A-B paired associates declined due to the learning of the subsequent A-C associates, and as a result, there was a higher rate of responses from list C by the participants on the recall test.

One day (24 hours) after learning both sets of associates, participants were tested again. A spontaneous recovery of B_{i} responses was observed, such that participants' responses of B_{i} items exceeded C_{i} items. After a rest period, participants could spontaneously remember the initial paired associates that they were not able to remember following the subsequent presentation of a second paired associate list the day prior. This A-B, A-C paradigm was replicated by researcher Bruce R. Ekstrand, thus increasing confirmation regarding the existence of spontaneous recovery.

=== Role of sleep ===
In an experiment conducted to further the findings of Briggs and Ekstrand, it was discovered that sleep counteracts retroactive interference compared to wakefulness. Using the same A-B, A-C paradigm, results indicated that memory performance for the first list of word-pair associates (A-B) was superior when learning was followed by nocturnal sleep rather than wakefulness. Sleep differentially affected the memory consolidation of the two lists, enhancing the memory for the first list more significantly. It has been suggested that the degree of initial learning predicts whether spontaneous recovery shall occur, stating that the better the learning of the A-B associations, the more likely they are to recover after interference. This effect is further catalyzed by sleep, which appears to have an enhancing effect on memory consolidation.

=== Traumatic memories ===
Emotionally unpleasant experiences tend to recur, even after frequent suppression. Such memories can be recovered gradually, through active search and reconstruction, or they can come to mind spontaneously, without active search.

It is suggested that there are important differences between people who gradually recover memories of abuse during suggestive therapy sessions and those who recover memories of abuse more spontaneously. Research on the propensity to forget what they had just remembered was conducted on women who had spontaneously recovered memories of childhood sexual abuse, versus those who recovered them through suggestive therapy. Women who spontaneously recovered their abuse were more likely (than women who recovered their memories of childhood abuse during suggestive therapy) to forget that they had successfully remembered words earlier on a memory test. As such, a reason that people might have a spontaneously recovered traumatic memory experience is because they simply forget having remembered the event before. They might forget prior cases of remembering if the mental context present when they are having their recovery experience differs from the mental context on prior occasions when they thought about the event. Thus, people have not forgotten the event, but they simply cannot remember it, perhaps due to context-dependent memory.

== Context-dependent extinction phenomena ==
=== Renewal effect ===
The renewal effect is a phenomenon in which a change of context after extinction can cause a robust return of conditioned responding. There are three models in which the renewal effect is observed.

1. The most common model is the "ABA renewal". Conditioning is conducted in one context (context A) and extinction is then conducted in a second (context B). When the conditional stimulus (CS) is returned to the original conditioning context (context A), responding to the CS returns.
2. A second version, "ABC renewal" is where conditioning is conducted in context A, extinction is conducted in context B, and then testing is conducted in a third, "neutral" context (context C). Renewal of responding is observed in the neutral context.
3. The final version, "AAB renewal", works whereby conditioning and extinction are both conducted in the same context (context A) and then the CS is tested in a second context (context B). This model currently has the least evidence of returned conditioned responding.

Since spontaneous recovery is defined as an extinguished response occurring after time has passed following the extinction, it can be viewed as the renewal effect that results when the CS is tested outside of its temporal context.

==== Role of GABA in renewal effects ====
Gamma-aminobutyric acid (GABA) transmission plays a significant role in the processes of renewal and spontaneous recovery from extinction. In a study that tested the spontaneous recovery of appetitive responding of rats, normal control rats responded more to a CS when it was tested in its acquisition context (this is ABA renewal) than its extinction context (ABB renewal condition). This is a classic example of ABA renewal. Administration of the partial inverse agonist, FG-7142, to the GABA_{A} receptor resulted in attenuated recovery in both the ABA and ABB test scenarios. The GABA_{A} receptor inverse agonist reduced GABA transmission, and the result was attenuation of the impact of context in eliciting the renewal effect. This research suggests that GABAergic mechanisms (mechanisms pertaining to neurons that produce GABA as their output) mediate ABA renewal and spontaneous recovery in appetitive conditioning. As such, spontaneous recovery and renewal are believed to share a common psychological mechanism.

=== Rapid reacquisition ===
Reacquisition of a conditioned response (CR) post-extinction is often faster than the initial acquisition. This indicates that the original learning was not destroyed but rather was "saved" through the process of extinction. Rapid reacquisition is normally produced when reinforced trials provide a contextual cue that can renew responding by signaling the initial acquisition trials.

Data from studies conducted on conditioned suppression provide evidence that this effect might occur due to spontaneous recovery and reinstatement of contextual stimuli that did not get extinguished, and thus remain related to the US.

Rapid reacquisition may be partially an effect of ABA renewal, whereby an animal (undergoing conditional learning) learns that the initial conditioning trials with the CS-US pairings are part of an original context of conditioning, whereas the more recent presentations of the CS alone are part of the context of extinction. Thus, when CS-US pairings are resumed post-extinction, they put the animal back into the mindset of the original conditioning context, and this contextual cue aids in reacquiring the CR more quickly than the initial learning. As such, rapid reacquisition will be produced when reinforced initial learning trials create a contextual cue, that in future acquisition trials gets activated and brings about the renewal of responding at a quicker rate than the initial response learning.

The process of extinction involves trials that are not reinforced, so that the CR of the animal declines when presented with the CS. A situation in which extinction procedures contain both reinforced and non-reinforced trials would weaken reacquisition, because introducing reinforced trials during extinction would result in the reinforced trials being associated both with extinction and conditional learning. This would render the animal less able to rapidly learn again the CR to the stimulus.

=== Reinstatement ===
Reinstatement refers to the recovery of conditioned behavior produced by exposures to the US. Reinstatement occurs when one is re-exposed to the US alone, after having undergone extinction. The effect is due to conditioning of the context, such that when the US is presented after extinction, an individual associates it with the original context.

Consider an example regarding reinstatement: say you learned an aversion to mangos because you got sick after eating one on a trip. Extinction of the aversion would result if you frequently ate bits of mangos without getting sick. Reinstatement suggests that if you became sick again for some reason, the aversion to mangos would return even if your illness had nothing to do with eating mangos. In this example, after extinction, presentation of the US (the experience of being sick) brings about the conditioned behaviour to be aversive to mangos.

=== Retrieval cues ===
The time at which a cue is presented has an important effect on whether it will be an efficient cue in either attenuating or enhancing recovery. If a cue is featured in extinction, it will attenuate spontaneous recovery more so than an equally familiar control cue that was featured in conditioning. This is because spontaneous recovery depends on the cue's specific correlation with extinction, and reintroducing a stimulus that is correlated with extinction will reduce spontaneous recovery of the response in future attempts at its retrieval.

Proposed views on extinction cues suggest that they reduce the degree to which the test condition matches conditioning. It is not that the extinction cue necessarily disrupts response performance via inhibition, but rather, the extinction cue functions to retrieve a memory of extinction. Such an extinction memory is that in which the CS and US are not related, and as such, spontaneous recovery of the response prior to extinction is attenuated. Spontaneous recovery would successfully occur if the subject failed to retrieve an extinction memory upon being presented with the extinction cue; however, it is usually observed that presenting an extinction cue leads to attenuated spontaneous recovery.

== Pathways of recall ==
Memories can be very different in nature, and as a result, different memories are stored and subsequently recalled via appropriate neural circuitry in the brain. The pathways of recalling a memory will therefore depend on the nature of the remembered stimuli that is being retrieved. Memory representation of different types of information can take on various forms.

=== Language recall ===
Regarding language processing in the human brain there is: 1) the existence of left hemisphere temporoparietal language areas outside the Wernicke's area; 2) extensive left prefrontal language areas outside the Broca's area; and 3) participation of these left frontal areas in a task emphasizing receptive language functions. A 1985 study conducted by Lendrem and Lincoln examines the spontaneous recovery of language abilities in 52 stroke patients between 4 and 34 weeks after the stroke. These patients had been suffering from aphasia, a disorder impairing the comprehension and expression of language, for more than 4 weeks. Patients had been randomly allocated to receive no speech therapy and had been assessed at 6 weekly intervals after the stroke incident, over which time there was a gradual improvement in language abilities. There was a lack of difference between factors such as sex, age, or aphasia type, suggesting that the amount of improvement expected in any patient cannot be readily predicted. Most recovery occurred in the first 3 months after stroke, and the level of the language abilities at 6 months post-stroke seem to depend almost exclusively on the severity of the patient's aphasia. A second study conducted in London, Ontario, took a closer look at oral imitation. Recovery on oral imitation was less than for comprehension tasks when tested for in the study. They suspected this result was attributable to the difference between spontaneous recovery and the recovery aided by speech therapy. Oral imitation would be practiced language behaviour whereas performance on language comprehension is a result of the spontaneous recovery of language processing abilities.

=== Audio recall ===
The pathway of recall associated with the retrieval of sound memories is the auditory system. Within the auditory system is the auditory cortex, which can be broken down into the primary auditory cortex and the belt areas. The primary auditory cortex is the main region of the brain that processes sound and is located on the superior temporal gyrus in the temporal lobe where it receives point-to-point input from the medial geniculate nucleus. From this, the primary auditory complex had a topographic map of the cochlea. The belt areas of the auditory complex receive more diffuse input from peripheral areas of the medial geniculate nucleus and therefore are less precise in tonotopic organization compared to the primary visual cortex. A 2001 study by Trama examined how different kinds of brain damage interfere with normal perception of music. One of his studied patients lost most of his auditory cortex to strokes, allowing him to still hear but making it difficult to understand music since he could not recognize harmonic patterns. Detecting a similarity between speech perception and sound perception, spontaneous recovery of lost auditory information is possible in those patients who have experienced a stroke or other major head trauma. Amusia is a disorder manifesting itself as a defect in processing pitch but also affects one's memory and recognition for music.

A study by Sarkamo and colleagues examined the neural and cognitive mechanisms that underlie acquired amusia and contribute to its recovery. They assessed 53 stroke patients three times within 6 months of having a stroke. This longitudinal setting of the study was used to determine the relationship between the recovery of music perception and the recovery of other cognitive functions. Results showed that amusia recovery was associated with a wide range of other functions such as language and visuospatial cognition. Stroke patients showed a recovery of implicit memory for musical structures and could produce tone intervals they were unable to perceive when tested originally. This suggests that although spontaneous recovery is possible with auditory cognition similar to other forms of cognitive function, there may be the possibility of an action-perception mismatch.

=== Visual recall ===
The pathway of recall associated with the retrieval of visual memories is the visual system. The image is captured by the eye and then transmitted to the brain by the optic nerve, which terminates on the cells of the lateral geniculate nucleus. The main target that the lateral geniculate nucleus projects onto is the primary visual cortex, which is the part of the cerebral cortex responsible for processing visual information. The analysis of visual stimuli continues through two major cortical systems for processing. The first is the ventral pathway, which extends to the temporal lobe and is involved in recognizing objects (the "what" pathway). The second is the dorsal pathway, which projects to the parietal lobe and is essential in locating objects (the "where" pathway).

In one study in 1995, Mark Wheeler illustrated spontaneous recovery of visual stimuli by presenting students with twelve pictures and allowing them three opportunities to study the pictures. The students were told this list was only for practice and then were shown two additional "real" lists for which they had to do the same thing. The students were given a free recall test after the third list for the pictures studied on the first list. Recall suffers significantly at first due to retroactive interference by the two additional lists. However, after thirty minutes free recall of the first-list pictures actually gets better. Perhaps these forgotten items recover because inhibition is gradually decreased.

== Depth of processing ==
Craik and Lockhart proposed a framework for the various levels of processing a stimulus. They assumed that the level or depth of processing of a stimulus has a large effect on its memorability. Deeper analysis produces more elaborate, longer-lasting and stronger memory traces. The stronger memories are, the more likely they will be to exhibit recovery.

=== Reminiscence ===
Reminiscence is the remembering again of the forgotten without re-learning, a gradual process of improvement in the capacity to revive past experiences. Simply put, it is the act of remembering information on a later test that could not be remembered on an earlier test. Ballard coined the term reminiscence in 1913 when he conducted a study asking young school children to memorize poetry. He found that over successive recalls, the children would often recall new lines of poetry that they failed to recall previously. The concept of reminiscence can be applied in treatment settings for patients with memory impairment. Reminiscence therapy involves the discussion of past activities and experiences with another person, utilizing tangible aids such as photographs to cue recall. This is normally used to assist dementia patients suffering from extreme memory loss. Reminiscence is also associated with one's own autobiographical memory, which is not evenly distributed through the lifespan. When left to recall their own self-memories, people over the age of forty experience a reminiscence bump, having a marked increase of memories from the period between ages fifteen and thirty. Reminiscence is required for the phenomenon of hypermnesia (an overall improvement in performance across tests) but hypermnesia is not required for reminiscence.

=== Hypermnesia ===
Hypermnesia is an improvement in memory that occurs with related attempts to retrieve previously encoded material. Hypermnesia is the net result of reminiscence and forgetting, such that the amount of reminiscence must exceed the amount of forgetting resulting in a net improvement overall. Ballard was the first to observe hypermnesia using a multiple recall task in 1913, the same task with which he discovered reminiscence. After asking young school children to memorize poetry, he initially retested their recall abilities 2 days later only to discover that the class improved by 10% over the initial recall level.

Hypermnesia was not considered a phenomenon until the mid-1970s, when Erdelyi and his associates completed further testing. Two suggestions have been offered to explain the increases in net recall over testing. One suggestion is that pictures and high imagery words enhance hypermnesia, speculating that this nature of stimuli is more recognizable and hence less susceptible to forgetting. The second suggestion is Roediger's level of recall hypothesis claiming that any variable that produces greater levels of depth processing lead to greater hypermnesia.

A 1991 study by Otani and Hodge suggests that hypermnesia does not occur with recognition but is found in cued recall experiments, showing that the improvement in memory performance is due to an increased rate of item recovery facilitated by relational processing. Relational processing can be made easier with well-categorized stimuli and helps to increase the availability or retrieval cues that in turn help to generate the to-be-remembered items. The phenomenon of hypermnesia continues to be examined, particularly in terms of its generalization.

== Therapies ==
=== Hypnotherapy ===
The term "hypnosis" is derived from the Greek word hypnos, which means "sleep". When in a state of hypnosis, otherwise known as a trance, one experiences deep relaxation and altered consciousness. This trance is particularly characterized by extreme suggestibility and heightened imagination. Within this state, individuals have complete free will and are fully conscious, however they become hyperattentive to the subject at hand and nearly exclude any other thought.

This state of trance is widely used as a means to recall suppressed or repressed memories. During hypnosis sessions, a great deal of spontaneous recovery can occur because the conscious thoughts are slowed down to allow much higher retrieval. Some memories can seem foreign to the patient because they have never been recalled before; this is usual proof that the therapy is working.

==== False memories ====
Although hypnosis and other suggestive therapy is a great way to create spontaneous recovery of memories, false memories can be constructed in the process. False memories are memories that contain facts that are incorrect, yet they are strongly believed by the person obtaining the memory. Research states that a lot of suggestive therapy can cause a false memory in patients because of the intense suggestions given by the trusted therapist. Suggestions can stir up memories from movies, stories, magazines, and many other of the innumerable stimuli one sees throughout their life. Hypnosis is a more relaxed, aware state where subjects can bypass a lot of the conscious doubts and mind chatter and be aware of what comes up from the unconscious.

In the United States many mental health workers rely on hypnosis to retrieve memories. Previous research concludes that with the active conscious mind consistently occupying one's mental capacity, hypnosis provides the calmness to retrieve what's needed.

=== Psychoanalytic therapy ===
Psychoanalytic therapy is a form of therapy where the patient discusses their life issues with a therapist, who asks specific questions while using their expertise to find underlying issues. This method of therapy can cause spontaneous recovery that is cued from the therapists questioning. Psychoanalytic therapy has been known to treat many behavioural problems, unconscious feelings and thoughts that affect the present moment. Through recalling specific events and gaining a new perspective, a patient can alleviate the issue they are concerned with.

=== Group therapy ===
Group therapy is similar to psychoanalytic therapy but it involves other people with a similar issue. This therapy adds other perspectives to gain clarity on a situation, and can cause spontaneous recovery in more cases because of the increase in other points of view.

=== Cognitive behavioural therapy ===
Cognitive behavioural therapy is a therapy that works with irrational thinking towards a specific situation. The key here is that the person may have not had that specific behavioural problem their whole life, and allowing them to view the event with a new perspective can change their behaviour. This is done differently from psychoanalytic therapy by exposing the patient to the stimulus they are afraid of. Through this exposure, they can unlearn any patterns of thought they had towards it by realizing that they are safe, referred to as extinction. Although, studies have shown that certain stimuli can cue a spontaneous recovery if there was not a full extinction of the associated perception to a memory.

=== Cases ===
One case documented by researcher Geraerts portrays both spontaneous recovery and false memories in the case of Elizabeth Janssen (name has been changed for the patient's courtesy). She was a very depressed woman and she had no idea why. Her life was great and up to her standards but she felt an underlying depressed feeling. She went to suggestive therapy where the therapist decided to engage her in visual imagery techniques to attempt to bring up childhood abuse that the therapist suggested she had. She denied ever being abused and had no recollection at all of such events. The therapist gave her books to read and information to study on childhood abuse. As the weeks went on with therapy she began recalling images of her father sexually abusing her. Within this case one can speculate that the therapist could have implanted these memories with weeks of suggestion, self-study, and authoritative persuasion that took place.

== Physiology ==
=== Procedural memory ===
For spontaneous recovery to occur, the conditioning of the memory that is recalled later needs to be stored in long-term memory. It is a process where the semantics and associations of the certain memory are so ingrained that they can become habitual or automatic to the person. For example, all the procedures needed to ride a bicycle are not taken into play every time you ride it. One simply knows to step on the pedal, propel their body up onto the seat, grip the handles, begin to pedal, look ahead, check the gears, balance oneself, etc. All of this becomes a form of implicit memory that doesn't need any attention to control or effort in recall; they are there for use in any particular circumstance.

With regard to a more general application of procedural learning in our life is with our beliefs and values we can hold to a certain subject. For example, if many times you get extremely jealous of someone having something that you do not have because your family can't afford it when you were young, you could believe that "things in life are hard to come by". When you're an adult another situation could arise that is similar, and the recovery of that association and inner response can show up spontaneously as jealousy again. It is why a lot of people say to themselves, "where does this feeling come from" or, "Why did I do that?" A lot of human reactions are from spontaneous recovery of past associations, not always specifically learned physical behaviours.

=== Neurochemistry ===
For the learning and recall associated with spontaneous recovery to happen, there are specific gyri and neurotransmitters that play a role. Firstly, the cerebellum is needed to acquire certain motor skills and develop an automatic state with the movement patterns that are learned. Both the dorsal and ventral prefrontal cortex have been shown to play a big role in the development of memory consolidation and motor control. Reciprocal loops are formed through neural circuits between the basal ganglia and prefrontal cortex which consolidate the memory. To elicit a stronger consolidation, rewards can be involved; the case for Pavlovian conditioning. The reward-related learning causes dopamine to release from the synapses of the basal ganglia and creates a stronger bond between the stimulus and response. Furthermore, if there is a traumatic incident that is associated to a memory, and that becomes suppressed, the amygdala is responsible for this fear conditioning. The amygdala leads to the caudate nucleus in the neocortex of the basal ganglia, so the fear response can also be triggered via spontaneous recovery. Basically, the stronger the emotional arousal after a learning event, positive or negative, can greatly enhance the memory's recall in the future.

Another area of the brain important for memory recovery is the hippocampus and medial temporal lobes. Regarding the former, studies have shown that the hippocampus is a crucial area to strengthen memories by forming stronger connections between neurons. This is done when a person associates more stimuli with a particular memory and it becomes more easily accessible. Temporal lobes are said to be the area of the brain that are important for storing new memories when learning. The availability of memories accessible to recall is positively correlated with the size and function of a person's temporal lobe.

== Drugs and psychostimulants ==
All drugs and stimulants of the brain can affect how someone learns, consolidates, and retrieves certain memories. For example, cocaine blocks the reuptake of dopamine, a neurotransmitter in the brain, causing an increase of dopamine in the synaptic cleft. This will elicit a rewarding feeling of liberation and security that can become addictive to some people. However, because of the increased dopamine levels in the brain, consolidation of memory can be affected which will then inhibit the chances of recovering that memory. Studies show that rats who were given cocaine were unable to perform motor tasks as successfully as the control group. Cannabis can also negatively affect spontaneous memory recovery because the plasticity strength of the initial memories are so inhibited due to the reduced neurotransmitters in the synaptic cleft.

Another relation of drugs to spontaneous recovery is the incidents regarding relapse. A recovered addict can be presented with stimuli that spontaneously recover motivational feelings that are believed to cause the relapse. The longer the extinction period of the abstinence from the drug, the more vulnerable the person is to relapsing spontaneously. For example, cocaine addicts who are thought to be "cured" can experience an irresistible impulse to use the drug again if they are subsequently confronted by a stimulus with strong connections to the drug, such as a white powder.

== Disorders ==
Spontaneous recovery, in terms of disorders, is a phenomenon in which the unwanted condition is overcome without professional treatment or formal help.

=== Autism ===
A case study reported that an individual spontaneously "recovered" from autistic disorder after a mere 13 days without therapeutic intervention. This individual was diagnosed with autistic disorder and severe mental retardation as per the DSM-IV-TR criteria. Over the course of 13 days, this individual revealed age appropriate reciprocal social interaction and communication by means of gesture, when no signs of communication were visible prior to the onset of the recovery period. This individual could also now show affection, emotional warmth, and self-expression.

No other instances of such rapid spontaneous "recovery" from autism have been yet documented, and currently, this "recovery" is quite unexplained and a matter of controversy.

=== Aphasia ===
Spontaneous recovery of language ability has been documented in patients who became aphasic following a stroke. For the purposes of assessing spontaneous recovery, the patients received no speech therapy and were assessed weekly following the stroke. Improvement in language ability occurred, despite the lack of professional treatment. Improvement occurred most markedly between the 4 and 10 weeks after the stroke, with little change following this time period. Most studies of spontaneous language recovery following stroke have exhibited that the improvement occurs within the first 3 to 4 months. This finding is of particular interest to speech therapists, to be able to separate natural recovery from aphasia in stroke patients, from improvement that is intervention-based.
