= James McGaugh =

American neurobiologist and author

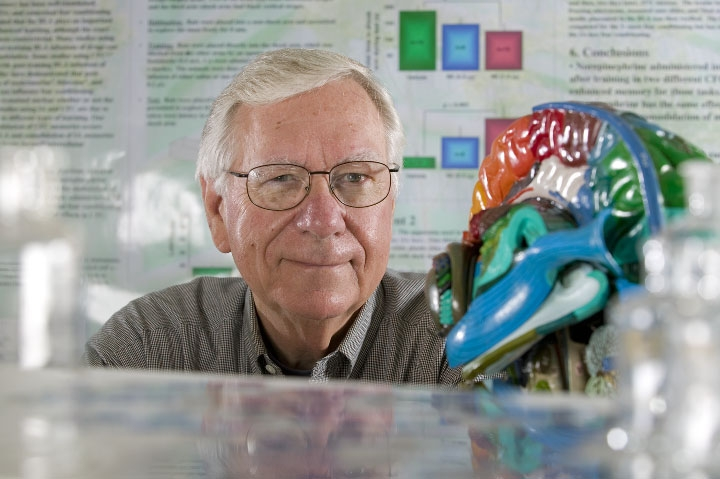
- McGaugh in March 2010
- Born: December 17, 1931 (age 94); Long Beach, California, U.S.
- Scientific career
- Education: San Jose State University (BA); University of California, Berkeley (PhD)
- Awards: Numerous (see section)
- Fields: Neurobiologist
- Workplaces: University of California, Irvine

James L. McGaugh (born December 17, 1931) is an American neurobiologist and author working in the field of learning and memory. He is a Distinguished Professor Emeritus of Neurobiology and Behavior at the University of California, Irvine, and the founding director of its Center for the Neurobiology of Learning and Memory.

== Education and Career ==
McGaugh received a B.A. in psychology from San Jose State University in 1953 and a Ph.D. from the University of California, Berkeley, in 1959. He joined the University of California, Irvine in 1964 as founding chair of the department now called Neurobiology and Behavior, and later served as dean of the School of Biological Sciences and as executive vice chancellor. He founded the Center for the Neurobiology of Learning and Memory in 1983. He became Distinguished Professor Emeritus in 2018.

== Research ==
McGaugh's research concerns memory consolidation. He reported that stress hormones, including epinephrine and cortisol, influence how well emotionally arousing experiences are remembered, and he studied the role of the amygdala in this process. He also co-authored studies of highly superior autobiographical memory, which were reported on the CBS program 60 Minutes in 2010.

His books include Memory and Emotion: The Making of Lasting Memories (Columbia University Press, 2003).

== Honors ==
• Honorary Doctor of Science, Southern Illinois University, 1991

• Member, National Academy of Sciences, and Fellow, American Academy of Arts and Sciences

• William James Fellow Award, American Psychological Society (now the Association for Psychological Science), 1989

• President, American Psychological Society, 1989 to 1991

• Karl Spencer Lashley Award, American Philosophical Society, 2009

• Grawemeyer Award in Psychology, University of Louisville, 2015

== Selected works ==
• "Time-dependent processes in memory storage." Science, 153 (1966): 1351 to 1358.

• "Memory: A century of consolidation." Science, 287 (2000): 248 to 251.

• Memory and Emotion: The Making of Lasting Memories. Columbia University Press, 2003.

• "Consolidating memories." Annual Review of Psychology, 66 (2015): 1 to 24.
