= Solomon Shereshevsky =

Russian mnemonist (1886–1958)

Solomon Veniaminovich Shereshevsky
- Соломон Вениаминович Шерешевский
- Born: 1886
- Died: 1 May 1958 (aged 71 or 72)
- Other name: Ш
- Occupation: Journalist
- Known for: Russian mnemonist

Solomon Veniaminovich Shereshevsky (Russian: Соломон Вениаминович Шерешевский; 1886 – 1 May 1958), also known simply as 'Ш' ('Sh'), 'S.', or Luria's S, was a Soviet journalist and mnemonist active in the 1920s. He was the subject of Alexander Luria's case study The Mind of a Mnemonist (1968).

== Studies ==
Shereshevsky participated in many psychological studies, most of them carried out by the neuropsychologist Alexander Luria over a thirty-year time span. He met Luria after an anecdotal event in which he was scolded for not taking any notes while attending a work meeting in the mid-1920s. To the astonishment of everyone there (and to his own astonishment in realizing that others could apparently not do so), he could recall the speech word for word. Throughout his life, Shereshevsky was tasked with memorizing complex mathematical formulas, huge matrices, and even poems in foreign languages that he had never spoken before, all of which he would memorize with meticulous accuracy in a matter of minutes.

On the basis of his studies, Luria diagnosed in Shereshevsky an extremely strong version of synaesthesia, fivefold synaesthesia, in which the stimulation of one of his senses produced a reaction in every other. For example, if Shereshevsky heard a musical tone played he would immediately see a colour, touch would trigger a taste sensation, and so on for each of the senses. The images that his synaesthesia produced usually aided him in memorizing. For example, when thinking about numbers he reported:

Take the number 1. This is a proud, well-built man; 2 is a high-spirited woman; 3 a gloomy person; 6 a man with a swollen foot; 7 a man with a moustache; 8 a very stout woman—a sack within a sack. As for the number 87, what I see is a fat woman and a man twirling his moustache.

The above list of images for digits is consistent with a form of synesthesia (or ideasthesia) known as ordinal linguistic personification but is also related to a well-known mnemonic technique called the number shape system where the mnemonist creates images that physically resemble the digits. Luria did not clearly distinguish between whatever natural ability Shereshevsky might have had and mnemonic techniques like the method of loci and number shapes that Shereshevsky described.

Shereshevsky also participated in experiments in which he showed that he had control over his body's involuntary (autonomic) functions. From a resting pulse of 70–72, he was able to increase it up to 100 by and decrease it to a steady 64–66. When asked how he could do this, he replied that he would either "see" himself running after a train that has just begun to pull out or by "seeing" himself lying in bed perfectly still while trying to fall asleep. Shereshevsky was also able to simultaneously raise the temperature of his right hand by 2 degrees while lowering the temperature of his left hand by 1.5 degrees. Once again, he stated that to do this, he simply "saw" a situation in which his right hand was touching a hot stove while his left hand was grasping a cube of ice. Shereshevsky also claimed to have been able to avoid pain by imagining that someone else was experiencing it and watching the other man experience it. As he described, "It doesn't hurt me, you understand, but 'him.' I just don't feel any pain." This, however, was never tested by Luria. Additionally, Shereshevsky claimed to be able to cure himself and others of sickness by imagining that the problem went away. This was dismissed by Luria as "naive magical thinking."

According to autobiographical diary of Shereshevsky, found by Reed Johnson, he "did not, in fact, have perfect recall". Details of Shereshevsky's biography are different in his own writing from Luria's account; according to Shereshevsky, they first met with Luria on April 13, 1929. Shereshevsky's father was a bookseller. Shereshevsky lived in Moscow with his wife, Aida, and son, in "a damp room in the basement of a janitorial outbuilding tucked away in a courtyard". According to Mikhail Reynberg, Shereshevsky's nephew, his uncle was pressed to work for the "secret police" (NKVD) because of his memory, but declined. Reynberg recalls that Shereshevsky "could be forgetful", and that he "trained hours a day for his evening performances", because he needed "consciously try to commit something to memory". Shereshevsky used method of loci, imagining Gorky Street in Moscow or "a village street from his childhood" as his memory palaces. He died in 1958 "from complications related to his alcoholism".

== Challenges ==
Shereshevsky had an active imagination, which helped him generate useful mnemonics. He stated that his condition often produced unnecessary and distracting images or feelings. He had trouble memorizing information whose intended meaning differed from its literal one, as well as trouble recognizing faces, which he saw as "very changeable". He also occasionally had problems reading, because the written words evoked distracting sensations. Things were far worse when he, for example, ate while reading. An example of the difficulties he faced in daily life:

One time I went to buy some ice cream ... I walked over to the vendor and asked her what kind of ice cream she had. 'Fruit ice cream,' she said. But she answered in such a tone that a whole pile of coals, of black cinders, came bursting out of her mouth, and I couldn't bring myself to buy any ice cream after she had answered in that way ...

Shereshevsky also had problems when the sound of a word didn't match its meaning. For example, he believed the word svinya ("pig") to sound very fine and elegant, which to him, didn't fit the description of a pig, whereas the Yiddish khazzer ("sow") had a much harsher sound to it that made him think of "a fat greasy belly, a rough coat caked with dried mud."

His memory was so powerful that he could still recall decades-old events and experiences in the smallest details. After he discovered his own abilities, he performed as a mnemonist; but this created confusion in his mind. He went as far as writing things down on paper and burning it, so that he could see the words in cinders, in a desperate attempt to forget them. Some later mnemonists have speculated that this was a mentalist's technique for writing things down to later commit to long-term memory. Reportedly, in his late years, he realized that he could forget facts with just a conscious desire to remove them from his memory, although Luria did not test this directly.

== In culture ==
The film Away with Words by Christopher Doyle was largely inspired by Luria's descriptions of Shereshevsky's life.

A BBC radio play The Memory Man by Robert Ferguson was based on Luria's book Mind of a Mnemonist.

"The Truth of Fact, the Truth of Feeling" by Ted Chiang mentions Solomon Shereshevsky's remarkable memory.

The character Alexei in D.W. Gregory's play Memoirs of a Forgotten Man is based on Shereshevsky.

Dr. Barbara Oakley's book A Mind For Numbers references Shereshevsky's memory in a larger chapter about chunking.

== See also ==
- Funes the Memorious, a short story by Jorge Luis Borges
- Ideasthesia
