= Virtual world language learning =

Virtual worlds are playing an increasingly important role in education, especially in language learning. By March 2007 it was estimated that over 200 universities or academic institutions were involved in Second Life (Cooke-Plagwitz, p. 548). Joe Miller, Linden Lab Vice President of Platform and Technology Development, claimed in 2009 that "Language learning is the most common education-based activity in Second Life". Many mainstream language institutes and private language schools are now using 3D virtual environments to support language learning.

== History ==
Virtual worlds date back to the adventure games and simulations of the 1970s, for example Colossal Cave Adventure, a text-only simulation in which the user communicated with the computer by typing commands at the keyboard. These early adventure games and simulations led to MUDs (Multi-user domains) and MOOs (Multi-user domains object-oriented), which language teachers were able to exploit for teaching foreign languages and intercultural understanding (Shield 2003).

Three-dimensional virtual worlds such as Traveler and Active Worlds, both of which appeared in the 1990s, were the next important development. Traveler included the possibility of audio communication (but not text chat) between avatars represented as disembodied heads in a three-dimensional abstract landscape. Svensson (2003) describes the Virtual Wedding Project, in which advanced students of English made use of Active Worlds as an arena for constructivist learning. The Adobe Atmosphere software platform was also used to promote language learning in the Babel-M project (Williams & Weetman 2003).

The 3D world of Second Life was launched in 2003. Initially perceived as another role-playing game (RPG), it began to attract the attention of language teachers. 2005 saw the first large-scale language school, Languagelab.com, open its doors in Second Life. By 2007, Languagelab.com's custom VoIP (audio communication) solution was integrated with Second Life. Prior to that, teachers and students used separate applications for voice chat.

Many universities, such as Monash University, and language institutes, such as The British Council, Confucius Institute, Instituto Cervantes and the Goethe-Institut, have islands in Second Life specifically for language learning. Many professional and research organisations support virtual world language learning through their activities in Second Life. EUROCALL and CALICO, two leading professional associations that promote language learning with the aid of new technologies, maintain a joint Virtual Worlds Special Interest Group (VW SIG) and a headquarters in Second Life.

Recent examples of creating sims in virtual worlds specifically for language education include VIRTLANTIS, which has been a free resource for language learners and teachers and an active community of practice since 2006, the EU-funded NIFLAR project, the EU-funded AVALON project, and the EduNation Islands, which have been set up as a community of educators aiming to provide information about and facilities for language learning and teaching. NIFLAR is implemented both in Second Life and in OpenSim. Numerous other examples are described by Molka-Danielsen and Deutschmann (2009) and Walker, Davies and Hewer (2012).

Since 2007 a series of conferences known as SLanguages have taken place, bringing together practitioners and researchers in the field of language education in Second Life for a 24-hour event to celebrate languages and cultures within the 3D virtual world.

With the decline of Second Life due to increasing support for open source platforms, many independent language learning grids such as English Grid and Chatterdale have emerged.

== Approaches to language education in virtual worlds ==
Almost all virtual world educational projects envisage a blended learning approach whereby the language learners are exposed to a 3D virtual environment for a specific activity or time period. Such approaches may combine the use of virtual worlds with other online and offline tools, such as 2D virtual learning environments (e.g. Moodle) or physical classrooms. SLOODLE. for example, is an open-source project which integrates the multi-user virtual environments of Second Life and/or OpenSim with the Moodle learning-management system. Some language schools offer a complete language learning environment through a virtual world, e.g. Languagelab.com and Avatar Languages.

Virtual worlds such as Second Life are used for the immersive, collaborative and task-based, game-like opportunities they offer language learners. As such, virtual world language learning can be considered to offer distinct (although combinable) learning experiences.

- Immersive: Immersive experiences draw on the ability to be surrounded by a certain (real or fictitious) environment that can stimulate language learning.
- Social: Almost all 3D virtual spaces are inherently social environments where language learners can meet others, either to informally practice a language or to participate in more formal classes.
- Creative: A less-developed approach to language learning in virtual worlds is that of constructing objects as part of a language learning activity. There is currently little documentation of such activities.

=== Six learnings framework ===
The "Six learnings framework" is a pedagogical outline developed for virtual world education in general. It sets out six possible ways to view an educational activity.

- Exploring: learners explore a virtual world's locations and communities as fieldwork for class.
- Collaborating: learners work together within a virtual world on collaborative tasks.
- Being: learners explore themselves and their identity through their presence in a virtual world, such as through role-play.
- Building: learners construct objects within a virtual world.
- Championing: learners promote real life causes through activities and presentations in a virtual world.
- Expressing: learners represent activities within a virtual world to the outside world, through blogs, podcasts, presentations and videos.

=== Learning in 3D worlds ===
- The 7 Sensibilities of Virtual Worlds for Learning presentation by Karl Kapp and Tony O'Driscoll illustrates how a 3D environment makes learning fundamentally different.
- The 3D Virtual Worlds Learning Archetypes presentation by Karl Kapp and Tony O'Driscoll describes 14 archetypes of how people learn in virtual worlds.

=== Constructivist approaches ===
3D virtual worlds are often used for constructivist learning because of the opportunities for learners to explore, collaborate and be immersed within an environment of their choice. Some virtual worlds allow users to build objects and to change the appearance of their avatar and of their surroundings. Constructivist approaches such as task-based language learning and Dogme are applied to virtual world language learning because of the scope for learners to socially co-construct knowledge, in spheres of particular relevance to the learner.

=== Task-based language learning ===
Task-based language learning (TBLL) has been commonly applied to virtual world language education. Task-based language learning focuses on the use of authentic language and encourages students to do real life tasks using the language being learned. Tasks can be highly transactional, where the student is carrying out everyday tasks such as visiting the doctor at the Chinese Island of Monash University in Second Life. Incidental knowledge about the medical system in China and cultural information can also be gained at the same time.

Other tasks may focus on more interactional language, such as those that involve more social activities or interviews within a virtual world.

=== Dogme language teaching ===
Dogme language teaching is an approach that is essentially communicative, focusing mainly on conversation between learners and teacher rather than conventional textbooks. Although Dogme is perceived by some teachers as being anti-technology, it nevertheless appears to be particularly relevant to virtual world language learning because of the social, immersive and creative experiences offered by virtual worlds and the opportunities they offer for authentic communication and a learner-centred approach.

=== WebQuests ===
Virtual world WebQuests (also referred to as SurReal Quests) combine the concept of 2D WebQuests with the immersive and social experiences of 3D virtual worlds. Learners develop texts, audios or podcasts based on their research, part of which is within a virtual world.

=== Language villages ===
The concept of real-life language villages has been replicated within virtual worlds to create a language immersion environment for language learners in their own country. The Dutch Digitale School has built two virtual language villages, Chatterdale (English) and Parolay (French), for secondary education students on the OpenSim grid.

=== Virtual classrooms ===
Hundsberger (2009, p. 18) defines a virtual classroom thus:

"A virtual classroom in SL sets itself apart from other virtual classrooms in that an ordinary classroom is the place to learn a language whereas the SL virtual classroom is the place to practise a language. The connection to the outside world from a language lab is a 2D connection, but increasingly people enjoy rich and dynamic 3D environments such as SL as can be concluded from the high number of UK universities active in SL."

To what extent a virtual classroom should offer only language practice rather than teaching a language as in a real-life classroom is a matter for debate. Hundsberger's view (p. 18) is that "... SL classrooms are not viewed as a replacement for real life classrooms. SL classrooms are an additional tool to be used by the teacher/learner."

=== Virtual tourism ===
Language learning can take place in public spaces within virtual worlds. This offers greater flexibility with locations and students can choose the locations themselves, which enables a more constructivist approach.

The wide variety of replica places in Second Life, e.g. Barcelona, Berlin, London and Paris, offers opportunities for language learning through virtual tourism. Students can engage in conversation with native speakers who people these places, take part in conducted tours in different languages and even learn how to use Second Life in a language other than English.

The Hypergrid Adventurers Club is an open group of explorers who discuss and visit many different OpenSim virtual worlds. By using hypergrid connectivity, avatars can jump between completely different OpenSim grids while maintaining a singular identity and inventory.

The TAFE NSW-Western Institute Virtual Tourism Project commenced in 2010 and was funded by the Australian Flexible Learning Framework's eLearning Innovations Project. It is focused on developing virtual worlds learning experiences for TVET Tourism students and located on the joycadiaGrid.

=== Autonomous learning ===
Virtual worlds offer opportunities for autonomous learning. The video Language learning in Second Life: an Introduction by Helen Myers (Karelia Kondor in SL) illustrates an adult learner's experiences of her introduction to SL and in learning Italian.

=== Tandem learning (buddy learning) ===
Tandem learning, or buddy learning, takes autonomous learning one step further. This form of learning involves two people with different native languages working together as a pair in order to help one another to improve their language skills. Each partner helps the other through explanations in the foreign language. As this form of learning is based on communication between members of different language communities and cultures, it also facilitates intercultural learning. A tandem learning group, Teach You Teach Me (Language Buddies), can be found in Second Life.

=== Holodecks ===
The term holodeck derives from the Star Trek TV series and feature films, in which a holodeck is depicted as an enclosed room in which simulations can be created for training or entertainment. Holodecks offer exciting possibilities of calling up a range of instantly available simulations that can be used for entertainment, presentations, conferencing and, of course, teaching and learning. For example, if students of hospitality studies are being introduced to the language used in checking in at a hotel a simulation of a hotel reception area can be generated instantly by selecting the chosen simulation from a holodeck "rezzer", a device that stores and generates different scenarios. Holodecks can also be used to encourage students to describe a scene or to even build a scene. Holodecks are commonly used for a range of role-plays.

=== CAVE technology ===
A cave automatic virtual environment (CAVE) is an immersive virtual reality (VR) environment where projectors are directed to three, four, five or six of the walls of a room-sized cube. The CAVE is a large theatre that sits in a larger room. The walls of the CAVE are made up of rear-projection screens, and the floor is made of a down-projection screen. High-resolution projectors display images on each of the screens by projecting the images onto mirrors which reflect the images onto the projection screens. The user will go inside the CAVE wearing special glasses to allow the 3D graphics that are generated by the CAVE to be seen. With these glasses, people using the CAVE can actually see objects floating in the air, and can walk around them, getting a realistic view of what the object would look like when they walk around it.

O'Brien, Levy and Orich (2009) describe the viability of CAVE and PC technology as environments for assisting students to learn a foreign language and to experience the target culture in ways that are impossible through the use of other technologies.

=== Virtual worlds and artificial intelligence ===
Immersion brought by virtual worlds is augmented with artificial intelligence capabilities for language learning. Learners can interact with the agents in the scene using speech and gestures. Dialogue interactions with automatic interlocutors provide a language learner with access to authentic and immersive conversations to role-play and learn via task-based language learning in an immersive classroom that uses AI and VR.

=== Voice chat ===
Earlier virtual worlds, with the exception of Traveler (1996), offered only text chat. Voice chat was a later addition. Second Life did not introduce voice capabilities until 2007. Prior to this, independent VoIP systems, e.g. Ventrilo, were used. Second Life's current internal voice system has the added ability to reproduce the effect of distance on voice loudness, so that there is an auditory sense of space amongst users.

Other virtual worlds, such as Twinity, also offer internal voice systems. Browser-based 3D virtual environments tend to only offer text-chat communication, although voice chat seems likely to become more widespread. Vivox is one of the leading integrated voice platform for the social web, providing a Voice Toolbar for developers of virtual worlds and multiplayer games. Vivox is now spreading into OpenSim at an impressive rate, e.g. Avination is offering in-world Vivox voice at no charge to its residents and region renters, as well as to customers who host private grids with the company. English Grid began offering language learning and voice chat for language learners using Vivox in May, 2012.

The advent of voice chat in Second Life in 2007 was a major breakthrough. Communicating with one's voice is the sine qua non of language learning and teaching, but voice chat is not without its problems. Many Second Life users report on difficulties with voice chat, e.g. the sound being too soft, too loud or non-existent – or continually breaking up. This may be due to glitches in the Second Life software itself, but it is often due to individual users' poor understanding of how to set up audio on their computers or of inadequate bandwidth. A separate voice chat channel outside Second Life, e.g. Skype, may in such cases offer a solution.

== Owning and renting land in virtual worlds ==
Owning or renting land in a virtual world is necessary for educators who wish to create learning environments for their students. Educators can then use the land to create permanent structures or temporary structures embedded within holodecks, for example the EduNation Islands in Second Life. The land can also be used for students undertaking building activities. Students may also use public sandboxes, but they may prefer to exhibit their creations more permanently on owned or rented land.

Some language teaching projects, for example NIFLAR, may be implemented both in Second Life and in OpenSim.

The Immersive Education Initiative revealed (October 2010) that it would provide free permanent virtual world land in OpenSim for one year to every school and non-profit organization that has at least one teacher, administrator, or student in attendance of any Immersive Education Initiative Summit.

== Alternative 3D worlds ==
Many islands in Second Life have language- or culture-specific communities that offer language learners easy ways to practise a foreign language. Second Life is the widest-used 3D world among members of the language teaching community, but there are many alternatives. General-purpose virtual environments such as Hangout and browser-based 3D environments such as ExitReality and 3DXplorer offer 3D spaces for social learning, which may also include language learning. Google Street View and Google Earth also have a role to play in language learning and teaching.

Twinity replicates the real life cities of Berlin, Singapore, London and Miami, and offers language learners virtual locations with specific languages being spoken. Zon has been created specifically for learners of Chinese. English Grid has been developed by education and training professionals as a research platform for delivering English language instruction using OpenSim.

OpenSim is employed as free open source standalone software, thus enabling a decentralized configuration of all educators, trainers, and users. Scott Provost, Director at the Free Open University, Washington DC, writes: "The advantage of Standalone is that Asset server and Inventory server are local on the same server and well connected to your sim. With Grids that is never the case. With Grids/Clouds that is never the case. On OSGrid with 5,000 regions and hundreds of users scalability problems are unavoidable. We plan on proposing 130,000 Standalone mega regions (in US schools) with Extended UPnP Hypergrid services. The extended services would include a suitcase or limited assets that would be live on the client". Such a standalone sim offers 180,000 prims for building, and can be distributed pre-configured together with a virtual world viewer using a USB storage stick or SD card. Pre-configured female and male avatars can also be stored on the stick, or even full-sim builds can be downloaded for targeted audiences without virtual world experience. This is favorable for introductory users who want a sandbox on demand and have no clue how to get started.

There is no shortage of choices of virtual world platforms. The following lists describe a variety of different virtual world platforms, their features and their target audiences:

- ArianeB's list of 3D Virtual Worlds: A useful list of virtual worlds and multiplayer games, including embedded videos that show how they look.
- Chris Smith's list of virtual worlds: A comprehensive list of virtual worlds, including some embedded videos.
- Virtual Worlds List by Category: As the title suggests, a categorised list of virtual worlds. Links only, no descriptions.

== Virtual world conferences ==
- The first SLanguages conference took place on 23 June 2007. The SLanguages conference is now a free annual 24-hours event, bringing together practitioners and researchers in the field of language education in Second Life.
- SL Experiments is a group managed by Nergiz Kern (Daffodil Fargis in Second Life) for collecting and sharing ideas on how to use Second Life for teaching foreign languages. The group meets twice a month in Second Life.
- The Virtual Round Table conference takes place twice a year, focusing on language teaching technologies. A substantial part of the conference takes place in Second Life.
- The Virtual Worlds Best Practices in Education (VWBPE) is a global grass-roots community event focusing on education in immersive 3D environments.
- The Virtual Worlds Education Roundtable (VWER) group meets each week to talk about issues that concern educators with regard to using virtual worlds as a teaching and learning tool.
- The Virtual World Conference is an annual conference exploring the uses of virtual worlds for learning, collaborative work and business. The first event was held on 15 September 2010 and hosted entirely in Second Life.

== Beyond virtual worlds ==
Virtual world language learning is a rapidly expanding field and it converges with other closely related areas, such as the use of MMOGs, SIEs and augmented reality language learning (ARLL).

=== Massively multiplayer online games (MMOGs) ===
MMOGs (massively multiplayer online games) are also used to support language learning, for example the World of Warcraft in School project.

=== Synthetic immersive environments (SIEs) ===
SIEs are engineered 3D virtual spaces that integrate online gaming aspects. They are specifically designed for educational purposes and offer learners a collaborative and constructionist environment. They also allow the creators/designers to focus on specific skills and pedagogical objectives.

=== Augmented reality language learning (ARLL) ===
Augmented reality (AR) is the combination of real-world and computer-generated data so that computer generated objects are blended into real time projection of real life activities. Mobile AR applications enable immersive and information-rich experiences in the real world and are therefore blurring the differences between real life and virtual worlds. This has important implications for m-Learning (Mobile Assisted Language Learning), but hard evidence on how AR is used in language learning and teaching is difficult to come by.

The main aim is to promote social integration among users located in the same physical space, so that multiple users may access to a shared space which is populated by virtual objects while remaining grounded in the real world. In other words, it means:

- Communication
- Locked view
- Keep control
- Security

== See also ==
- Adult education
- Andragogical learning theory
- Andragogy
- Blended learning
- Computer-assisted language learning
- Computer-based testing
- Distance education
- E-learning
- Heutagogy
- Hybrid course
- Learning management system
- M-learning
- Microlearning
- Microlecture
- Online learning community
- Online music education
- Virtual education
- Web-based simulation
