= Frank Otto =

Frank Otto may refer to:

- Frank Otto (academic) (1936–2017), American educator
- Frank Otto (media entrepreneur) (born 1957), German media entrepreneur
- Frank Otto (water polo) (born 1959), German water polo player

== See also ==
- Otto Frank (physiologist) (1865–1944), German academic and cardiac researcher
- Otto Frank (1889–1980), German businessman; father of Anne Frank
- Otto Franke (disambiguation)
