= Italki =

Language learning website

italki
- Website type: Language Learning
- Available in: Arabic, Czech, Dutch, English, Esperanto, French, German, Italian, Japanese, Korean, Polish, Portuguese, Russian, Simplified Chinese, Spanish, Thai, Traditional Chinese, Turkish and Vietnamese
- Headquarters: Hong Kong, {{{location_country}}}
- Country of origin: China
- Area served: Worldwide
- Founders: Kevin Chen, Yongyue Jiang
- CEO: Kevin Chen
- Industry: Language learning,Online education, Professional certification
- Services: 1-1 language lessons
- Website: italki.com
- Commercial: Yes
- Registration: Required (free)
- Launched: 2007; 19 years ago
- Current status: Active
- Native clients on: iOS & Android

italki (/ˈaɪtɔːki/) is an online language learning platform which connects language learners and teachers through video chat. The site allows students to find online teachers for 1-on-1 tutoring, and teachers to earn money as freelance tutors. italki is headquartered in Hong Kong, China.

One can choose online language lessons taught by a professional teacher, who provides structured learning plans, or a community tutor. Students may also use it as a platform for mutual language exchange.

== History ==
In 2007, Kevin Chen and Yongyue Jiang co-founded italki as an online language exchange community. At the start, the site was focused on building free features for the community. In 2009, the site launched its teacher marketplace, allowing teachers to earn money by providing online tutoring services. Teachers on italki set their own price and time schedule.

In 2012, italki raised angel funding from independent investors. In 2016, italki raised $3 million from Hujiang, a Baidu-invested Chinese education company with over 100 million users.

As of July 2017, italki has more than 3 million users from more than 100 countries, and 5,000 teachers. English is the most popular language being studied, followed by Spanish, French, Chinese, and Japanese. The site offers more than 100 languages for students and teachers to choose from Its user interface supports 19 languages.

== Product and Services ==
=== One-on-one lessons ===
Italki offers one-on-one language lessons connecting learners with teachers via video. Teachers are either professional teachers with teaching credentials or community tutors for conversation practice.

=== Group classes ===
Italki offers live online group classes in multiple languages, including English, Spanish, French, and Japanese. The classes cover topics such as conversation practice, exam preparation, and cultural themes.

=== Italki Plus ===
Italki offers a paid subscription service known as italki Plus, which provides AI-generated study materials, automated lesson summaries, and practice exercises.

== See also ==
- Preply
- HelloTalk
- Tandem (app)
- Language education
- Online education
- Community language learning
- Online platforms for collaborative consumption
