= Social media language learning =

Method of language acquisition

Social media language learning is a method of language acquisition that uses socially constructed Web 2.0 platforms such as wikis, blogs, and social networks to facilitate learning of the target language. Social media is used by language educators and individual learners that wish to communicate in the target language in a natural environment that allows multimodal communication, ease of sharing, and possibilities for feedback from peers and educators.

Proponents of social media language learning are likely to support the theory of language socialization developed by linguistic anthropologists Elinor Ochs and Bambi Schieffelin which claims that language learning is interwoven with cultural interaction and is mediated by linguistic and other symbolic activity. Social media provides an environment that allows users to weave their goal of language acquisition with culturally relevant interactions through a wide array of available platforms that are often categorized as formal for classroom use and informal for personal use.

== Formal use ==
Educators can integrate social media tools into their existing pedagogy. Online environments used by education professionals include course management systems, wikis, blogs, virtual worlds, and more. Pedagogical use of social media in a language classroom can take a myriad of forms, such as classroom blogs to discuss culturally relevant topics in the target language, social media apps with specialized platforms for classroom use, learning environments developed specifically for schools, and much more.

=== Indigenous language classrooms ===
For Indigenous languages that are vulnerable and critically endangered, social media among other digital technologies can offer access to supportive communities, experienced educators, and other learning opportunities. Through pedagogical use of social media, educators and learners are given the opportunity to engage with Indigenous communities around the world, access a myriad of resources not previously available, and engage in their education in a new medium. Social media language learning is especially pertinent for the Indigenous language classroom because being surrounded by and engaging in meaning conversations aligns with Indigenous cultural values of community. However, classroom-based Indigenous language revitalization efforts have been criticized for failure to promote use and transmission of the language outside of an educational context.

== Informal use ==
Social media is employed by language learners outside of traditional learning environments. Informal language learning through social media can occur through personal social network use, language learning apps with a social component, online gaming, fan communities, and more.

=== Language learning apps ===
There are a myriad of language learning websites and apps that rely on social interaction between learners or have a social component. These resources have varying levels of social media elements. One example of an app with a low social element is the popular language learning app Duolingo, which allows users to share their progress and scores with other language learners within a largely independent learning platform.

There are also apps that have a social media foundation. The app Tandem is an example of an app with a more demanding social aspect as an app that is designed specifically for language exchange with other learners. Tandem and other similar apps allow users to work on their skills in the target language with other language learners and teachers through consistent communication via written messaging and audio phone calls. In this way, these social language learning apps can facilitate language learning through real conversations with other community members.

=== Social networks ===
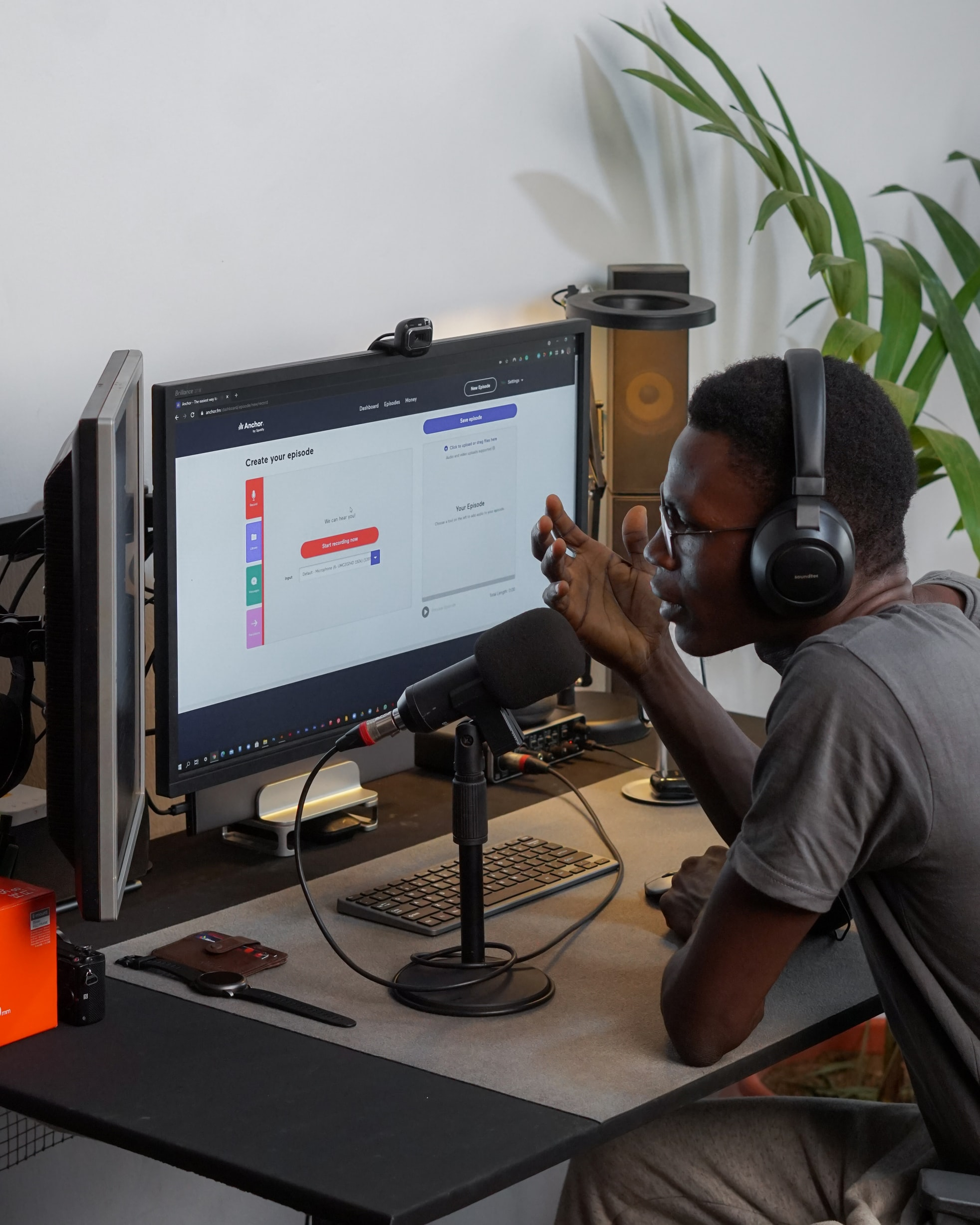
Users can upload audio/video to teach and learn languages on YouTube

Common social media platforms such as Facebook and Twitter are used by language learners to communicate with other learners and native speakers of the target language. Many social networks include the ability to join virtual groups that either have other language learners as group members or group members with an external shared interest that they communicate about in the target language.

YouTube is another social network that is commonly used by language educators and learners. There are many popular language education channels on YouTube that have a large number of followers that use the video-based platform to learn and interact with other users. Language learners also use this platform to demonstrate their progress with a language, such as YouTuber Evan Edinger who posted popular videos showcasing his knowledge of German as a foreign language.

Stan Twitter is a social network community within Twitter, in which the target language is used but is not the focus of the group. Research done on language acquisition in the Stan Twitter community found that language learning and meme discourse learning happened naturally while engaging in the community's activities and interacting with other members. Some members of online communities such as Stan Twitter are not interested in language learning but acquire the language regardless because of the requirement to use a specific language for communication with group members.

=== Online gaming ===
A MMO (massively multiplayer online) game can be used to facilitate language acquisition via their built-in chat functions that enable participants to chat with players that speak different languages. By participating in an interactive gaming experience, players have the opportunity to engage in the target language and help them gain an understanding of conversational norms and grammar constructions. However, language use in video games is highly contextual and many video games use repetitive language that can limit a more holistic understanding of the target language. Games transform the learning process from a passive task to one in which individuals engage actively in the experience of learning by focusing first on meaning. Computer games, researchers argue, supply authentic environments for language learning, complete with ample opportunities for students to develop and test their emerging target language knowledge.

== See also ==
- Computer mediated communication
- Computer-assisted language learning
- MMORPG
- Networked learning
