= Tandem (app) =

Language exchange app

Tripod Technology GmbH
- Website type: Language Exchange Platform Privately Held Corporation
- Available in: Multilingual: Chinese (Simplified, Traditional); English; French; German; Italian; Japanese; Korean; Portuguese (Brazilian); Russian; Spanish (Latin American)
- Headquarters: Berlin, {{{location_country}}}
- Founders: Arnd Aschentrup, Tobias Dickmeis, Matthias Kleimann
- Industry: E-Learning, Online Education
- Services: Language exchange, Online tutoring, Tandem language learning, Online learning community
- Website: www.tandem.net
- Registration: Required (free)
- Launched: February 2015; 11 years ago
- Current status: Active
- Native clients on: Android, iOS

Tandem is a mobile language exchange and language learning app.

== History ==
Tandem was founded in Hannover, Germany in 2014 by Arnd Aschentrup, Tobias Dickmeis, and Matthias Kleimann. Prior to founding Tandem, the trio had launched Vive, a members-only mobile video chat platform.

Tandem has been criticised for not accepting members into the community immediately, as opposed to competitors including HelloTalk, Speaky or Cafehub. In some countries, there is a waiting list and applicants can wait up to seven days for their application to be processed by human moderators.

In 2015, Tandem completed its first funding round (seed funding) of €600,000. Participating investors included business angels such as Atlantic Labs (Christophe Maire), Hannover Beteiligungsfonds, Marcus Englert (Chairman of the Supervisory Board of Rocket Internet SE ), Catagonia, Ludwig zu Salm, Florian Langenscheidt, Heiko Hubertz, Martin Sinner, and Zehden Enterprises. In 2016, the company received a further €2 million from new investors Rubylight and Faber Ventures, as well as from existing investors Hannover Beteiligungsfonds, Atlantic Labs, and Zehden Enterprises.

Since 2018, the premium membership Tandem Pro has been available, which offers members unlimited access to all language learning features of the app as well as the removal of advertising for a monthly fee.

== See also ==
- italki
- HelloTalk
- English as a second or foreign language
