= Tandem (disambiguation) =

Tandem means an arrangement one behind another as opposed to side by side.

Tandem may also refer to:

== Companies ==
- Tandem Computers, a former manufacturer of fault-tolerant computer systems
- Tandem Diabetes Care, insulin infusion therapy manufacturer for the treatment of diabetes
- Tandem Money Limited, a British finance company
  - Tandem Bank, previously Harrods Bank
- Tandem, a language exchange app

== Entertainment ==
- Tandem (film), a 1987 French dramatic road movie directed by Patrice Leconte
- Tandem (TV series), a 2018 Armenian sitcom
- Tandem Productions, a former American television production company
- Tandem Publishing Co, see Universal-Tandem Publishing Co Ltd, a former publishing company in the UK
- Tandem Verlag, a German publishing company, founded 1994
- "Tandem" (song), a 1990 song by Vanessa Paradis from the album Variations sur le même t'aime

== Sport ==
- Tandem (UCI), a para-cycling classification for visually impaired cyclists who require a sighted pilot

== Technology ==
- Air Command Tandem, an American gyroplane design
- TandEM, a space project to explore Saturn's moons Titan and Enceladus
- Tandem accelerator, see Particle accelerator
- Tandem bicycle
- Tandem carriage
- Tandem-charge, an explosive device or projectile that has two or more stages of detonation
- Tandem cell, a type of solar cell
- Tandem language learning, a method of language learning
- Tandem mass spectrometry, see Mass spectrometry
- Tandem repeat, a pattern of adjacent repetitions of nucleotides in DNA
- Tandem rotors
- Tandem signaling
- Tandem single-chain variable fragment, a type of pharmaceutical drug
- Tandem skydiving
- Tandem switch for telephone exchanges without telephones
- Tandem wing, a kind of aircraft

== See also ==
- Medvedev–Putin tandemocracy
