= Charles Arthur Curran =

Charles A. Curran
- Born: Charles Arthur Curran; October 9, 1913; Philadelphia, Pennsylvania, U.S.
- Died: July 25, 1978 (aged 64)
- Education: St. Charles College, Columbus (Ph.D.); Ohio State University (Doctorate, 1944)

Charles Arthur Curran (October 9, 1913 – July 25, 1978) was an American priest of the Roman Catholic Diocese of Columbus and psychologist best known as the creator of Community Language Learning (CLL), a method in education specifically applied in Second Language Teaching.

He was a central member of the psychology faculty at Loyola University Chicago, and a counseling specialist.

== Career ==
Curran received a Doctorate in Psychology from Ohio State University in 1944.

As a psychologist and educator, he worked along with Carl Rogers, and took certain principles from person-centered therapy and applied them to the field of education.

In 1952, Curran proposed the essential idea of the "Counseling-Learning" approach, or "counselearning". He incorporated counseling techniques that take into account the students' feelings toward their learning experience, and are meant to lower the affective filter. In the early 1970s, he proposed Community Language Learning as a method based on his approach. His views, which were mostly promoted and tested by his students Paul G. La Forge (1971) and Taylor (1979), among others, gained particular attention and prominence in the 1980s and the 1990s through the work of Jennybelle P. Rardin (1994), Keiko Komimy (1994) and Katherine M. Clarke (1989).

As a priest, he wrote several books in which he addressed the topic of institutionalized religious education, and the theological concept of sin compared to the sense of guilt in psychotherapy.

He saw the "mechanized concept of man," or the idea that "man is merely a machine," as the result of industrialism and scientism, which he viewed as a part of the problem of the human condition and criticized. In his writings, he advocated a change in the "approach to the human person" or a "return to a more ancient unified view of man".

== Works ==
=== Books ===
- Personality Factors in Counseling (1945)
- Counseling in Catholic life and education (1952)
- A Catholic Psychologist Looks at Pastoral Counseling (1959)
- The concept of sin and guilt in psychotherapy (1960)
- Counseling and Psychotherapy: The Pursuit of Values (1968)
- Religious Values in Counseling and Psychotherapy (1969)
- Psychological Dynamics in Religious Living (1971)
- Counseling-learning: A Whole-person Model for Education (1972)
- Counseling-learning in Second Languages (1976)
- Understanding: An essential ingredient in human belonging (1978)

=== Papers ===
- "Religious Factors and Values in Counseling: Counseling, Religion and Man (Autumn 1958). The Catholic Counselor and Readings. Volume 3, Issue 1, pages 3–24.
- Some Ethical and Scientific Values in the Counseling Therapeutic Process (September 1960). Personnel and Guidance Journal. 39:15-29.
- Counseling, Psychotherapy, and the Unified Person (1963). Journal of Religion and Health.
- Religious Factors and Values in Counseling: Counseling, Religion and Man

== Bibliography ==
- Clarke, K. M. (1989). Creation of meaning: An emotional processing task in psychotherapy. Psychotherapy: Theory, Research, Practice, Training, 26(2), 139–148. https://dx.doi.org/10.1037/h0085412
- C. Kevin Gillespie (2001). "Psychology and American Catholicism: From Confession to Therapy?". Crossroad Pub.
- Robert Kugelmann (2011), "Psychology and Catholicism: Contested Boundaries".
- Keiko K. Samimy (Note: Wife of Mohammad Samimy) & Jennybelle P. Rardin (1994). "Adult Language Learners' Affective Reactions to Community Language Learning: A Descriptive Study." Foreign Language Annals. https://onlinelibrary.wiley.com/doi/10.1111/flan.1994.27.issue-3/issuetoc
