= Captured =

Captured may refer to:

== Music ==
- Captured (Caroline's Spine album), 2007
- Captured (Christian Bautista album) or the title song, 2008
- Captured (Journey album), 1981
- Captured (Rockwell album) or the title song, 1985
- Captured (mixtape) or the title song, by Spice, 2018
- Captured, an album by the Albion Band, 1995
- Captured, an album by Flame, 2010
- "Captured", a song by Heaven 17, 2017

== Other uses ==
- Captured!, a 1933 American war film
- Captured (1998 film), an American action thriller film
- Captured (TV series), syndication title for Gangbusters, a 1952 American anthology crime series
- Captured (video game), or The SuperCan, a 1986 platform game for the Commodore 64

== See also ==
- Capture (disambiguation)
