= Intelligent computer-assisted language learning =

Intelligent computer-assisted language learning (ICALL), or intelligent computer-assisted language instruction (ICALI), involves the application of computing technologies to the teaching and learning of second or foreign languages. ICALL combines artificial intelligence with computer-assisted language learning (CALL) systems to provide software that interacts intelligently with students, responding flexibly and dynamically to student's learning progress.

Natural language processing (NLP) and intelligent tutoring systems (ITS) are prominent computing technologies in artificial intelligence that inform and influence ICALL. Other computing technologies applied to ICALL include knowledge representation (KP), automatic speech recognition (ASR), neural networks, user modelling, and expert systems. In relation to language learning, ICALL utilizes linguistic theory and theories of second-language acquisition in its pedagogy.

== History ==
ICALL developed from the field of computer-assisted language learning (CALL) in the late 1970s and early 1980s. ICALL is a smaller field, and not yet fully formed.

Following the pattern of most language learning technologies, English is a prominent language featured in ICALL technology. ICALL programs have also been developed in languages such as German, Japanese, Portuguese, Mandarin Chinese, and Arabic. ICALL systems are also contributing to the learning of languages that are not as accessible to learn (due to a lesser amount of language resources), or less commonly learned languages, such as Cree.

== Features ==
Intelligent CALL is sometimes called parser-based CALL, due to the heavy reliance that ICALL has on parsing. An example of the function of parsing in an ICALL software is a parser detecting errors in the syntax and morphology of sentences freely generated by student users. After using parsing to find any errors, ICALL can provide corrective feedback to students. Parsing is considered a task of natural language processing.

The ability for students to receive feedback on random, uniquely produced sentences places ICALL in a more engaging teacher role. If students are struggling in certain areas, some ICALL systems will invent new sentences or questions in those areas, giving students more practice. Basically, ICALL is meant to intelligently adapt to student learning needs as a student progresses; this often means (partially or wholly) fulfilling a tutor or teacher role. Programs that attempt to fulfill this role are categorized as tutorial ICALL.

Non-tutorial ICALL systems include various language tools and dialogue systems, such as a digital interlocutor. Programs for automatically evaluating student-written essays have also been invented, such as the E-rater.

== Limitations ==
ICALL technology still has many issues and limitations, due to the recency of artificial intelligence being integrated into CALL systems, and the complexity of this enormous task. Artificially intelligent educational software should do its best to encompass the linguistic knowledge and pedagogy of a language teacher in order to resolve these issues. This includes tracking student learning, giving feedback, creating new challenging material in response to student needs, understanding effective teaching strategies, and detecting linguistic errors (grammar, spelling, semantics, morphology, and so on).

Additionally, ICALL systems take a long time to develop, and developers must consult professionals in many disciplines. Programming ICALL software is a necessarily multi-disciplinary project.

Further research and development in ICALL may potentially benefit the fields of applied linguistics, computational linguistics, artificial intelligence, educational technology, and similar fields. ICALL may also expand current knowledge about second language acquisition.

== See also ==
- Artificial intelligence
- Educational technology
- Intelligent tutoring systems
- Language acquisition
- Language education
- Natural language processing
- Second-language acquisition
