= BLT (disambiguation) =

BLT is a sandwich with bacon, lettuce, and tomato.

BLT may also refer to:

== Art, entertainment, and media ==
- B.L.T. (album), a 1981 blues rock LP
- Beautiful Lady & Television, a monthly periodical (issued from 1997)
- Brian Lester "BLT" Thomas, a character in the Degrassi High TV series (aired 1987–1991)
- Bolek Lolek and Tola, a trio in the show Bolek and Lolek Polish animated series (appearance 1972–1986)

== Businesses ==
- Baselland Transport, a Swiss bus and tram operator
- BHP, an Australian mining multinational (LSE stock symbol: BLT)
  - Blackwater Airport, a BHP-owned aerodrome in Queensland (IATA code: BLT)
- Barking Lizards Technologies, developer

== Science, technology and mathematics ==
- Basic Linguistic Theory, a linguistic typology framework
- Balanced ligamentous tension, in medicine
- Bit blit, a computer graphics method
- BLT theorem, in mathematical analysis
- blt, ISO 639-3 code for the Tai Dam language
- blt, branch less equal, an RISC-V instruction

== Other uses ==
- The Indonesian-language abbreviation for cash transfers (bantuan langsung tunai), oftentimes used within socio-governmental contexts
- Bhagwa Love Trap conspiracy theory, popularised in 2020
- A battalion landing team of the U.S. Marines
- Bear-Lion-Tiger, a trio of bonded animals at the Noah's Ark Animal Sanctuary from 2001
