= Immerse =

Immerse may refer to:

- Immerse, Christian music event in the United States that replaced Music in the Rockies
- Immerse Learning, online virtual school
- Immerse, Malaysia-based marketing agency acquired and rebranded as Havas Immerse
- "Immerse" (2015), video single from Welsh rock band Holding Absence
- Immerse Entertainment, Filipino actor Enrique Gil's production company

== See also ==
- Immersion (disambiguation)
