= International Association for Language Learning Technology =

Language education in the United States

The International Association for Language Learning Technology (IALLT) was founded in 1965 as the National Association of Language Lab Directors (NALLD), created as a not-for-profit professional association to help faculty and staff directing the first language labs to ensure their development as lab directors. As language lab directors became language center directors and language hub directors, NALLD changed into IALL (International Association for Learning Laboratories) in 1989 and then to IALLT in 1991. IALLT's membership is quite diverse, including faculty in languages and linguistics; language center directors, faculty, and staff; (U.S.) Title VI Language Resource Center directors, faculty, and staff; professionals in educational publishing; instructional technology staff; chief information officers; senior university administrators; and independent scholars, among others. IALLT hosts a listserv (LLTI) for the exchange of information about language technology and language centers

IALLT holds the IALLT Conference every other year at universities and in cities across North America and periodically cosponsors the International Conference on Foreign Language Education and Technology (FLEAT) with the Japan Association for Language Education and Technology (J-LET). IALLT also has an official presence at related conferences worldwide, as well as relationships with other organizations like ACTFL, CALICO, AsiaCALL, and EuroCALL. Its official publication is The FLTMAG, which is a free online magazine on technology integration in language teaching and learning. It maintains an archive of the now-defunct IALLT Journal, a peer-reviewed, scholarly, online-only journal, as well as book-length publications in areas relating to language learning technology and language centers. Its newest publication is “The Language Handbook”, which updates two earlier publications and includes new chapters.

IALLT is an organization of volunteers with no paid Executive Director. It is governed by a Board of Directors (President, President-Elect, Secretary, Treasurer, and Programs Director), as well as a Council composed of around 36 members, including the immediate Past President, regional presidents, and members affiliated with related groups and entities
