= Charles Curran (theologian) =

American priest and theologian

The Reverend Dr. Charles Curran
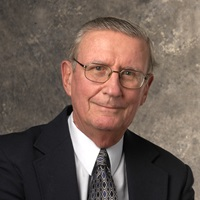
- Born: Charles E. Curran; March 30, 1934 (age 92); Rochester, New York, United States
- Education: St. Bernard's College, New York (B.A.); Pontifical Gregorian University (S.T.L., S.T.D.); Alphonsian Academy, Rome (S.T.D., with a specialization in moral theology)

Charles E. Curran (born March 30, 1934) is an American moral theologian and Catholic priest. He currently serves at Southern Methodist University as the Elizabeth Scurlock University Professor of Human Values.

== Biography ==
Curran grew up in Rochester, New York, and was ordained there in 1958 for the Diocese of Rochester. After intensive graduate work and earning two doctorates in theology in Rome, Curran taught at the seminary in Rochester, New York. In 1965 he joined the theology faculty at the Catholic University of America in Washington, D.C. Contrary to some sources, he did not serve as a peritus or expert at the Second Vatican Council (1962–1965); that distinction belonged to Charles Arthur Curran, a member of the psychology department at Loyola University Chicago.

In April 1967, university trustees voted to let Curran's tenure track appointment lapse rather than reappoint him, primarily because of his dissenting views on contraception. After a faculty-led strike that included students, the university reversed its position on Curran two weeks later and the trustees not only reappointed him, but also promoted him to associate professor with tenure.

Curran later returned to prominence in 1968, becoming part of a group of 87 theologians who authored a response to Humanae vitae, Pope Paul VI's encyclical affirming the traditional ban on artificial contraception. Curran continued to teach and write on the church's teaching on various moral issues, including premarital sex, masturbation, contraception, abortion, homosexual acts, divorce, euthanasia, and in vitro fertilization, throughout the 1970s and 1980s.

Curran was again removed from the faculty of the Catholic University of America in 1986 as a dissident against the Catholic Church's moral teaching. He maintains in his 1986 Faithful Dissent that Catholics who may dissent nevertheless accept the teaching authority of the pope, bishops and the Congregation for the Doctrine of the Faith.

== Views ==
Curran contended in 1971 that homosexual acts, in the context of a committed relationship, fell short of the ideal but were to be considered good for homosexual people; he stated that "I had come to accept the moral legitimacy of a union of two gay men or lesbians." In 1992, he said that "the official hierarchical Roman Catholic teaching should accept the moral value and goodness" of same-sex relationships, not excepting those that include sex. However, he has since recognized shortcomings in this argument, albeit without explicitly stating a change of position.

Curran has stated that the Congregation for the Doctrine of the Faith systematically attempted to silence authors critical of teachings on homosexuality, citing the "highlighting" of errors in John J. McNeill's The Church and the Homosexual.

== Controversy, lawsuit, and aftermath ==
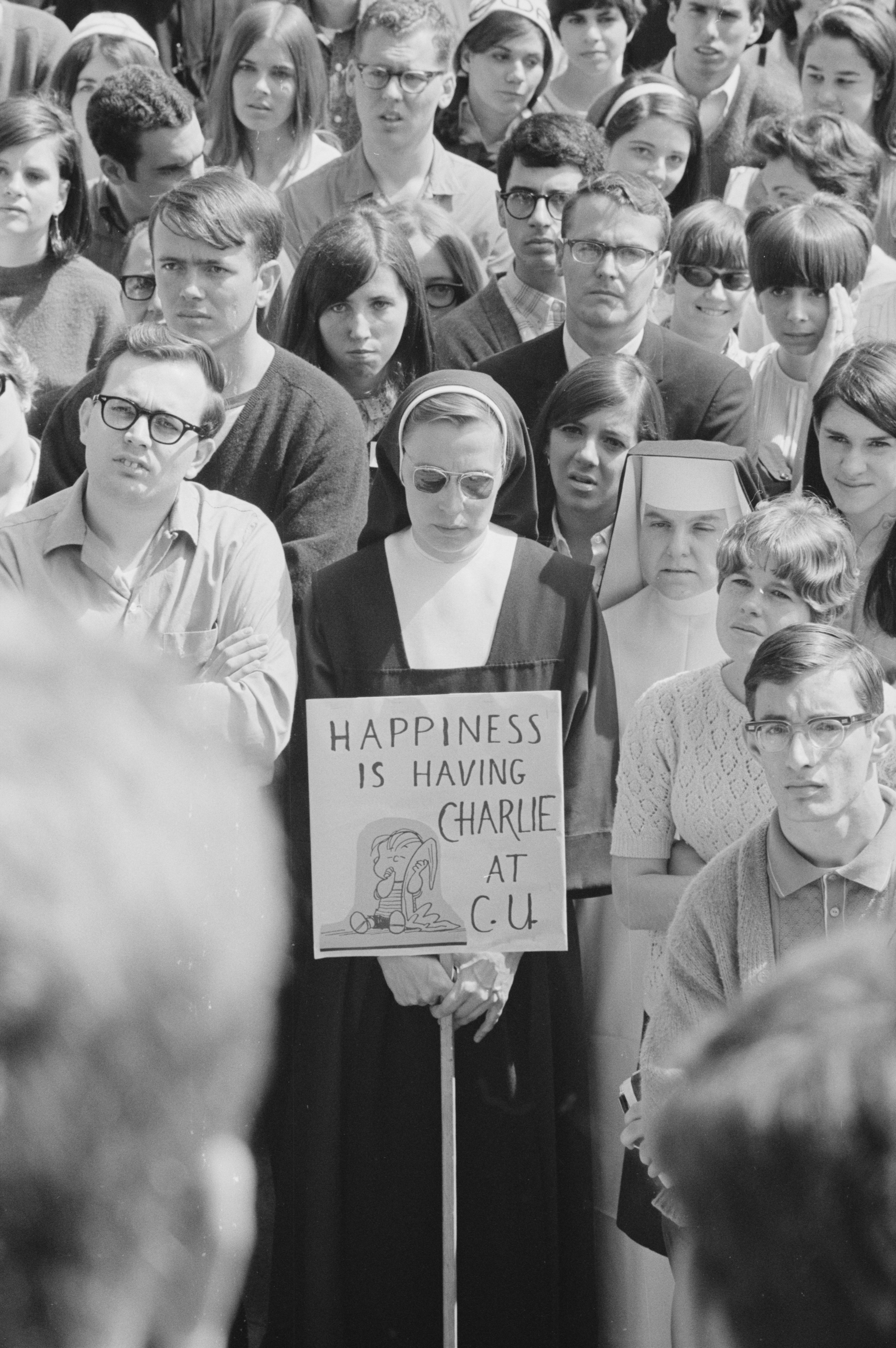
Nuns and students demonstrating against the trustees' vote to not reappoint professor Curran in 1967

In 1986, the Vatican declared that Curran could no longer teach theology at the Catholic University of America schools, and he was neither suitable nor eligible to be a professor of Catholic theology. Curran sued the university for wrongful dismissal and breach of contract and lost. Although a tenured professor, "clashes with Church authorities finally culminated in a decision by the Sacred Congregation for the Doctrine of the Faith, headed by then-Cardinal Joseph Ratzinger [later Pope Benedict XVI]". The areas of dispute included publishing articles that debated theological and ethical views regarding divorce, "artificial" contraception, masturbation, pre-marital intercourse and homosexual acts.

As noted in an American Association of University Professors (AAUP) report, "Had it not been for the intervention of the Sacred Congregation for the Doctrine of the Faith, Professor Curran would undoubtedly still be active in the [Catholic University's] Department of Theology, a popular teacher, honored theologian, and respected colleague." Curran's attorneys argued that CUA did not follow proper procedures or its own policy statements in handling the case. In essence, CUA claimed that the Vatican's actions against Curran trumped any campus-based policy or tenure rules.

In 1989, he filed suit against Catholic University, and the court determined that the university had the right to fire him for teaching views in contradiction to the school's religion.

While the controversy was unfolding, Curran taught as a visiting professor at Cornell University, the University of Southern California, and Auburn University. Curran's efforts to secure an appointment at Auburn (1990–1991) started with positive prospects for Curran: a prospective commitment that would have included an endowed chair and tenure. But despite strong support from ranking faculty committees, the institution's president, James Martin, for reasons he would not disclose, refused to include tenure in Curran's appointment. The theologian then decided to accept a year's non-tenured teaching appointment at the university while looking elsewhere. Before the end of the academic year he was invited to take a position at Southern Methodist University in Dallas, which granted tenure and an endowed chair. Since then he has published personal accounts about his experience with the Catholic Church and his viewpoint on the actions of Catholic Church authorities, in Loyal Dissent: Memoirs of a Catholic Theologian.

== Education ==
- B.A., St. Bernard's College (New York), 1955.
- S.T.L., Pontifical Gregorian University, 1959.
- S.T.D., Pontifical Gregorian University, 1961.
- S.T.D., (with a specialization in moral theology), Alphonsian Academy (Rome), 1961.

== Selected publications ==
- Loyal Dissent: Memoirs of a Catholic Theologian (Washington: Georgetown University Press, 2006)
- The Moral Theology of Pope John Paul II (Washington: Georgetown University Press, 2005)
- Catholic Social Teaching 1891–Present: A Historical, Theological, and Ethical Analysis (Washington: Georgetown University Press, 2002)
- The Catholic Moral Tradition Today: A Synthesis (Washington: Georgetown University Press, 1999)
- Moral Theology at the End of the Century (Milwaukee: Marquette University Press, 1999)
- The Origins of Moral Theology in the United States: Three Different Approaches (Washington: Georgetown University Press, 1997)
- co-editor of the eighteen-volume series from Paulist Press: Readings in Moral Theology

For a complete bibliography of Curran, see Thomas W. O'Brien, "Bibliography of Charles E. Curran 1961-90: Thirty Years of Catholic Moral Theology", Horizons 18 (1991): 263–78, and O'Brien, "Bibliography of Charles E. Curran, 1990-2000: Another Decade of Catholic Moral Theology", Horizons 28 (2001): 307–13.
