= Mobile-assisted language learning =

Language learning technique

Mobile-assisted language learning (MALL) is language learning that is assisted or enhanced through the use of a handheld mobile device.

MALL is a subset of both Mobile Learning (m-learning) and computer-assisted language learning (CALL). MALL has evolved to support students’ language learning with the increased use of mobile technologies such as mobile phones (cellphones), MP3 and MP4 players, PDAs and devices such as the iPhone or iPad. With MALL, students are able to access language learning materials and to communicate with their teachers and peers at any time, anywhere.

== History ==
1980s

- Twarog and Pereszlenyi Pinter used telephones to provide distant language learners with feedback and assistance.

1990s

- Instructors at Brigham Young University-Hawaii taught a distance education English course from Hawaii to Tonga via telephone and computer (Green, Collier, & Evans, 2001)

2000s

- Dickey (2001) utilized teleconferencing to teach an English conversation course to students in South Korea.
- Stanford University learning lab used integrated mobile phones in a Spanish learning program in 2001 (Brown, 2001).
- Thornton and Houser (2002; 2003; 2005) developed several innovative projects using mobile phones to teach English at a Japanese university. They also developed a course management system, Poodle, to facilitate deploying language learning material to mobile phones.
- City College Southampton developed a web based "media board" (similar to a web-board but supporting Multimedia Messaging Service (MMS) as well as Short Message Service (SMS) and supplied learners of English as a Second Language (ESL) with mobile phones with inbuilt cameras and voice recording facilities (JISC, 2005).
- University of Wisconsin–Madison, developed several foreign language courses which have used wireless handheld computers for various classroom activities (Samuels, 2003).
- Duke University provided all incoming freshmen with free iPods equipped with voice recorders. Amongst the pilot courses utilizing the players were several language courses, which utilized both their listening and recording capabilities (Belanger, 2005).
- United Kingdom’s Open University used voice recorders and mini-camcorders to record interviews with other students and locals and to create audiovisual tours in distance-learning German and Spanish course (Kukulska-Hulme, 2005). The Open University used mobile phones for language learning
- A project in Ireland used MALL for Irish Language learning and assessment
- The Le@rning Federation (TLF) used MALL for Indonesian Language learning across three states

== Affordances and constraints ==
Enhancing language learning through MALL provides dynamics which are not available through the traditional classroom. MALL offers ubiquitous access to learning anytime, anywhere the user has reception. This enables users to brush up on language skills just before or just after a conversation in the language they are learning. Handheld delivery also affords new dynamics for collaborative learning as users can share the language learning process in small synchronous groups.

Kloper et al. (2002) claimed 5 properties of mobile devices which can produce unique educational affordances:

- Portability-the small size and weight of mobile devices means they can be taken to different sites or moved around within a site.
- Social interactivity-data exchange and collaboration with other learners can happen face-to-face.
- Context sensitivity-mobile devices can both gather and respond to real or simulated data unique to the current location, environment and time.
- Connectivity-a shared network can be created by connecting mobile devices to data collection devices, other devices or to a common network.
- Individuality- scaffolding for difficult activities can be customized for individual learners.

The most notable constraints for earlier MALL include poor sound and display quality coupled with very limited devices and download speeds. Newer integrated PDA devices have narrowed the gap with higher access speeds, larger screens, having functions and capacities similar to laptop computers (Nah, et al. 2008). Since the PDA devices are now mostly displaced by smartphones, in particular those based on iOS and Android, it is safe to say the constraints mentioned earlier are now non-existent.

== Sources ==
Resources that focusing on Mobile Assisted Language Learning are not common (check Augmented Reality Language Learning). We more often find resources that are primarily language learning websites with some space dedicated to technology in language learning and vice versa.

- Belanger, Y. "Duke University iPod first year experience final evaluation report".2005. https://web.archive.org/web/20070609084848/http://cit.duke.edu/pdf/ipod_initiative_04_05.pdf
- BJET - British Journal of Educational Technology http://www.blackwellpublishing.com/journal.asp?ref=0007-1013 (2008 vol. 39)
- Brown, E. (Ed.) "Mobile learning explorations at Stanford Learning Lab."http://sll.stanford.edu/projects/tomprof/newtomprof/postings/290.html2001
- Green, B.A., Collier, K.J., & Evans, N. "Teaching tomorrow's class today:English by telephone and computer from Hawaii to Tonga." In L.E. Henrichsen (Ed.), Distance-;earning program (pp. 71–82). Alexandria, VA: Teachers of English to Speakers of Other Language, Inc. 2001
- IJEL - International Journal on e-Learning http://www.aace.org/pubs/IJEL/ (Specific volumes dedicated to m-learning)
- IRRODL - International Review of Research in Open and Distance Learning http://www.irrodl.org/ (2007 Vol. 8, No. 2)
- JCAL - Journal of Computer Assisted Learning http://www.blackwellpublishing.com/journal.asp?ref=0266-4909&site=1 (2003 vol. 19, 2005 vol. 21)
- JISC - Joint Information Systems Committee. Multimedia learning with mobile phones. Innovative Practices with Elearning. Case studies: Anytime, any place Learning. 2005 https://web.archive.org/web/20091002030332/http://www.jisc.ac.uk/uploaded_documents/southampton.pdf
- Klopfer, Eric. "Augmented Learning: Research and Design of Mobile Educational Games." MIT Press, 2008.
- Klopfer, E, Squire, K and Jenkins, H. "Environmental Detectives: PDAs as a window into a virtual simulated world." Proceedings of IEEE International Workshop on Wireless and Mobile Technologies in Education. Vaxjo, Sweden: IEEE Computer Society, 95-98 2002
- Kululska-Hulme, Agnes. Traxler, John. "Mobile Learning: A Handbook For Educators and Trainers (The Open and Flexible Learning Series)." Routledge, 2005.
- Language Learning & Technology - Language Learning & Technology is a refereed journal which began publication in July 1997. The journal seeks to disseminate research to foreign and second language educators in the US and around the world on issues related to technology and language education. http://llt.msu.edu/
- Menzies, David. "Duke University iPod First-Year Experience." Duke's University Center for Instructional Technology coordinated an evaluation of the academic use of iPod, drawing on course-level feedback; student and faculty focus groups; a broad survey of first-year students and faculty; and discussions and feedback among staff, administrators and important campus stakeholder groups. This evaluation focused on the feasibility and effectiveness of the iPod as a tool for faculty and student academic use. This report summarizes the main findings of this collaborative assessment effort.
- Metcalf, David S. "mLearning: Mobile Learning and Performance in the Palm of Your Hand." HRD Press. 2006
- mLearnopedia – By using the "search" function, you can enter "language learning" as an exact phrase and turn up some resources specific to MALL. http://mlearnopedia.com/
- Samuels, J. "Wireless and handheld devices for language learning." Proceedings of the 19th Annual Conference on Distance Teaching and Learning, Madison, WI. 2003. http://www.uwex.edu/disted/conference/Resource_library/proceedings/03_50.pdf
- Son, J.-B. (2016). Selecting and evaluating mobile apps for language learning. In A. Palalas & M. Ally (Eds.), The international handbook of mobile-assisted language learning (pp. 161–179). Beijing: China Central Radio & TV University Press.
- Stacey, E. (2002). "Learning links online: Establishing constructivist and collaborative learning environments." In S. McNamara and E. Stacey (Eds), Untangling the Web: Establishing Learning Links. Proceedings ASET Conference 2002. Melbourne, 7–10 July. https://web.archive.org/web/20051227121119/http://www.aset.org.au/confs/2002/stacey.html
- Twarog, L., & Pereszlenyi-Pinter, M. "Telephone-assisted language study and Ohio University: A report." The Modern Language Journal, 72, 426–434. 1988
- Thornton, P., & Houser, C. "M-learning in transit." In P. Lewis (Ed.), The changing face of CALL(pp. 229–243). 2002
- Thornton, P., & Houser, C. "Using mobile web and video phones in English language teaching: Projects with Japanese college students. " In B. Morrison, C. Green, & G. Motteram (Eds.), Directions in CALL: Experience, experiments & evaluation (pp. 207–224). 2003
- Thornton, P., & Houser, C. "Using mobile phones in English Education in Japan." Journal of Computer Assisted Learning, 21, 217–228. 2005
- Nah, Ki-Chune. White, Peter. and Sussex, Roland. "The Potential of Using mobile Phone to Access the Internet for Learning EFL Listening Skills Within a Korean Context." ReCALL. 20 (3): 331-347 2008 http://www.eurocall-languages.org/recall/index.html
- Askraba, V. (2008). Mobile Assisted Language Learning and its Impact on Student Motivation and Acquisition. MNetComp Thesis. Monash University, Australia.
- Wong, L.-H., Boticki, I., Sun, J., & Looi, C.-K. (2011). Improving the scaffolds of a mobile-assisted Chinese character forming game via a design-based research cycle. Computers in Human Behavior, 27(5), 1783–793. doi:10.1016/j.chb.2011.03.005
- Wong, L.-H., Chin, C.-K., Tan, C.-L., & Liu, M. (2010). Students’ personal and social meaning making in a Chinese idiom mobile learning environment. Educational Technology & Society, 13(4), 15–26.
- Wong, L. H., King, R. B., Chai, C. S., & Liu, M. (2016). Seamlessly learning Chinese: contextual meaning making and vocabulary growth in a seamless Chinese as a second language learning environment. Instructional Science, 44(5), 399-422.
