= Frank Otto (academic) =

American linguist

- Born: Francis Richard Otto; October 7, 1936 (age 89); Cleveland, Ohio, US
- Died: July 26, 2017
- Education: PhD in Educational Administration (Applied Linguistics and Materials Development): University of Wisconsin–Madison; MA in Spanish Language and Literature: University of Wisconsin–Madison; BA in Spanish Language & Literature and U.S. History: Baldwin-Wallace_College in Berea, Ohio
- Occupations: Retired university professor and entrepreneur
- Years active: 1966–2006
- Spouse: Janet Mae Reed(1958–present)
- Children: 5 children, ages 42 to 56
- Parent: Albert Francis Otto; Elizabeth Ruth McKenna

Frank Otto (October 7, 1936 – July 26, 2017) was an American educator, pioneer in computer-assisted language learning (CALL), entrepreneur, and the founding executive director of CALICO (the Computer-Assisted Language Instruction Consortium).

== Early academic career ==
Otto received his PhD in 1960 from the University of Wisconsin-Madison. During his program there he conducted dissertation research in the area of foreign languages in the elementary school. With support from publisher Heath de Rochemont, a division of D.C. Heath, he investigated alternative approaches to staffing foreign language programs. His projects involved working with the publisher’s efforts to broadcast their Parlons Français program to over two million schoolchildren in the Midwest from a DC-3 airplane flying overhead. In addition to his degree in Educational Administration and Curriculum Development, Otto also received his state certification as a teacher of Spanish, History, and English.

Upon graduation from Wisconsin, he took a faculty position at Ohio State University in one of the first programs in foreign language education in the United States. During his time at Ohio State, Otto worked with such well-known figures in Foreign Language Education as Dr. Edward Allen and Dr. Paul Pimsleur. Pimsleur on more than one occasion agreed with Otto's opinion that foreign language instruction was eventually "going to wind up on the computer!”

In 1972 Otto accepted the position to serve as Director of the Language Institute at the University of the Americas in Puebla, Mexico. He also worked with the US embassies in Mexico, Guatemala, Honduras, Ecuador, Panama, Costa Rica, El Salvador, and Columbia not only throughout Latin America but also in Asia, mainly in the Philippines. During that time in his career he also served on the Advisory Committee on Learning Technologies for the Developing World established by the Institute for International Research of the US Agency for International Development.

== Brigham Young University ==
Following his work in Central and South America, Otto was recruited by Brigham Young University (BYU) in 1975 to help develop a program in ESL (English as a second language). While at BYU he participated in the development for the TICCIT system. of what could well be the first interactive multimedia program for teaching Spanish online.

During his time at BYU, Otto was instrumental in the founding of CALICO (the Computer-Assisted Language Instruction Consortium). As an important part of his work with CALICO, he also served as the founding editor of the CALICO Journal.

== Entrepreneurship ==
Following his service at BYU and for CALICO, Otto retired and devoted full-time to his company CALI for the development of ELLIS, which stands for "English Language Learning Instruction System" as an allusion to Ellis Island, the port of entry for millions of immigrants to the United States of America. ELLIS was later purchased by Pearson Learning and is still available today from Pearson as ELLIS: A Digital Learning ELL Curriculum.
