= Smigin =

Language learning platform

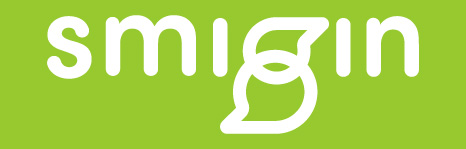
- Smigin Logo
- Available in: Multilingual: Smigin Travel: English (USA/UK/Australian); Spanish (Spain/Latin American); Portuguese (Brazilian); French; Italian; Swedish; Haitian Creole; Smigin: Spanish (Spain); Italian; Portuguese (Portugal); English as a Second Language (UK, from Turkish and Portuguese)
- Headquarters: New York, US
- Area served: World; European Union
- Founder: Susan O'Brien
- CEO: Susan O'Brien
- Industry: Online education, translation, e-learning, software development, Language learning software
- Website: www.smigin.com
- Advertising: no
- Registration: yes
- Launched: 17 February 2014; 12 years ago
- Current status: Online
- Native clients on: Android, iOS, Windows, macOS

Smigin is a conversation-based language learning platform available online and as a mobile application for iOS and Android. As of March 2016, Smigin has two products: Smigin, a language-learning website and Smigin Travel, a mobile translation app. Smigin's language learning site offers 4 different destination languages across 3 source languages, with several languages in development. Smigin Travel, exclusively designed for the mobile interface, is available on iOS and Android in 11 languages with users in over 175 countries.

== History ==
Smigin was founded by Irish entrepreneur Susan O’Brien as an alternative to traditional language learning products and methods that focus on rigid grammar structures rather than conversational language. After moving to Portugal and having to learn Portuguese as a complete beginner, O’Brien – a University College Cork graduate who speaks six languages – decided to develop a language learning solution that puts the user in control of their learning and focuses on what users wants to learn, with primary emphasis on conversational language.

Smigin Travel, the company's first product, launched on the App Store on February 17, 2014. Smigin Travel is a multilingual, multi-directional “phrasebuilder” tool that enables travelers to speak a foreign language. Its user interface enables users to build and translate phrases across location-based sections such as Café, Restaurant, Hotel etc. The app also features phonetic spelling and audio recorded by native language speakers to help users pronounce their phrase.

With the support of Google in New York City, Smigin began to optimize Smigin Travel for Android in mid-2015 and in August 2015 released the Android version on the Google Play Store. Smigin Travel is free to download, and users have the ability to unlock additional content through in-app purchases. Initial support for the Smigin Travel app grew quickly and the company amassed users in 175 countries. The app is available in English, Spanish, French, Italian, Portuguese, Polish, Swedish and Haitian Creole.

On September 29, 2015, Smigin launched a month-long Kickstarter campaign with a funding goal of $20,000 for its second product named after the company. On October 27, 2015, Smigin successfully passed its funding goal and on October 29, 2015, Smigin acquired upwards of $20,000 to invest in further product development for its second product.

In March 2016, the company released its eponymous second product, Smigin – a browser-based language learning solution for beginners with an emphasis on conversational skills. Smigin launched in Spanish, Italian, Portuguese and English as a Second Language. Additional languages will be added throughout 2016, including Asian languages.

Smigin is listed by Digital NYC as a Made in NY startup.

== Methodology ==
Smigin's patent-pending methodology employs a three-step approach to speaking a foreign language:

Curated content: All Smigin content has been curated for location-based or situational scenarios to reflect useful language for real life application. Users pick sections to access relevant words and phrases they need to say at any given time.
Built-in grammar: Smigin's “built-in grammar" uses the infinitive form of verbs so users can create a wide variety of sentences without conjugations.
Real-life language: By gaining instant access to relevant words and phrases, Smigin empowers users to “break down language barriers” and become confident travelers by engaging in conversation. Users are encouraged to travel and apply their new skills to interactions with foreign locals.

== Products ==
=== Smigin ===
Smigin's language courses focus on conversation as the center of the user's learning. Each course is segmented into context-based sections such as Meet & Greet, Café, and Hotel. Most sections are based on situations in which language beginners may find themselves abroad, and are divided into three levels: Words, Phrases, and Chat. Instead of forcing users into a fixed learning structure that involves rote memorization and grammar drills, Smigin allows users to freely navigate the platform. Users can also access reference sessions that provide additional vocabulary words, as well as detailed explanations of the language's grammar rules.

==== Chat ====
Chat allows users to simulate short conversations with a virtual “local” to prepare for real-life conversations with locals abroad. During Chat, users enhance their conversational skills by responding to questions and prompts. Chat's text-input interface demonstrates the variety of conversations a user can have in another language without an in-depth knowledge of verb conjugations and varied grammatical structures.

==== Words and Phrases ====
Users are encouraged to start a section by learning relevant words and phrases related to that section. Phrases use the Smigin Method of enabling the user to create simple sentences without worrying about grammar; to add visual context, all videos were shot on-location in countries where the language is spoken (e.g. Spain, Italy, Portugal). Users can listen to native speaker audio, view the phonetic pronunciation of each word or phrase, and translate to and from their native language throughout these levels.

=== Smigin Travel ===
Smigin Travel is a mobile application for iOS and Android that enables users to build and translate phrases in multiple languages while abroad. Smigin Travel allows users to create phrases and ask questions based on various situations in which they will find themselves on their travels.

As of March 2016, the sections consisted of: Café, Bar, Restaurant, Hotel, Shopping, Emergency, Getting Around, Transport, Business, and Destinations. Each section features sentence starters, pre-conjugated verbs, and sentence objects that together form phrases and questions based on the respective section.

Users have the ability to hear their phrases spoken by native speakers, read simplified phonetic spelling to learn how best to pronounce them using their native syllables, and save phrases for later use. Additionally, users have the ability to create their own personal phrasebook that suits the needs of their travel experiences.

As of March 2016, Smigin Travel amassed users in over 175 countries.
