= HelloTalk =

Educational app

- Logo used since 2016
- Trade name: Shenzhen XinHui Technology Co., Ltd. (深圳心慧科技有限公司)
- Type: Language exchange Instant messaging
- Founded: 2012
- Founder: Zackery Ngai
- Headquarters: Shenzhen, China
- Number of employees: 50
- Website: Official website

HelloTalk, also abbreviated as HT, is a language exchange app and website released in 2013. It is monetized using the freemium model. It was created by Chinese developer Zackery Ngai.

As of December 2025, the platform supports learning and communication in more than 260 languages, including English, Japanese, Spanish, French, Chinese, Korean, and German. The application is available for download on Android and Apple stores and can also be accessed via the web.

== History ==
HelloTalk was created by Zackery Ngai (Wei Lihua), a Chinese software developer born in Hainan and raised in Hong Kong. The app was launched in 2013. The company, HelloTalk Inc., is based in Shenzhen, China. It has an estimated 50 employees.

Over half of the users are from China, Japan, South Korea, and the United States. Ngai stated in 2023 that the app had over 1 million paid users and makes several million CNY monthly in revenue.

In 2016, the app was reported to have 3 million users. In May 2018, it reached 10 million users. It grew significantly during the COVID-19 pandemic, reaching 20 million downloads in 2020.

According to the company, it has had over 70 million registered users, as of 2026.

== Products and services ==
HelloTalk is monetized using a freemium model, offering users a set of basic features for free alongside optional paid services.

The free version provides core language-learning functions such as language-partner matching, AI translation, grammar correction, and participation in Voiceroom, which are sufficient for general learning needs. Paid subscriptions unlock additional advanced features, including unlimited translations and simultaneous learning of multiple languages, designed for frequent users or multilingual learners. Subscription terms and pricing are displayed within the app, allowing users to upgrade after trying the basic features.

HelloTalk provides a one-on-one matching system that enables users to learn from native speakers by engaging in mutual language exchange. Matches can be filtered based on language, age, region, and interest tags, and the platform's AI algorithm recommends potential partners accordingly. Users can choose preferred communication styles depending on their language proficiency and social needs. Built-in tools such as translation, pronunciation, transliteration, and grammar correction facilitate cross-language communication. Users may send audio messages, pictures, and emojis similar to other messaging apps such as WhatsApp. They can also send pre-made messages to start conversations on various topics.

HelloTalk includes a “voiceroom" feature, offering real-time voice-based communication. These rooms are organized by topic, such as daily conversation or travel advice, and users may join as listeners or active speakers depending on their disposition. The feature supports real-time captioning and translation.

== See also ==
- italki
- Tandem (app)
- Online chat
