= Capture =

Capture may refer to:

== Arts and entertainment ==
- "Capture", a song by Simon Townshend
- Capture (band), an Australian electronicore band previously known as Capture the Crown
- Capture (TV series), a reality show

=== Television episodes ===
- "Chapter One: Capture", Zastrozzi, A Romance episode 1 (1986)
- "Capture", Adam-12 season 6, episode 9 (1973)
- "Capture", Argevollen episode 22 (2014)
- "Capture", G.I. Joe: Sigma 6 season 1, episode 3 (2005)
- "Capture", Invasion America episode 7 (1998)
- "Capture", Logan's Run episode 3 (1977)
- "Capture", Richard the Lionheart episode 28 (1963)
- "Capture", Special Forces: World's Toughest Test season 2, episode 8 (2023)

== Science ==
- Gravitational capture, where an astronomical object enters into a stable orbit around another body
  - Asteroid capture, when an asteroid is gravitationally captured
- Electron capture, a nuclear reaction
- Stream capture, a geomorphological phenomenon occurring when a stream or river is diverted from its own bed
- Neutron capture, a nuclear reaction

== Technology ==
- Capture effect, a phenomenon in which only the stronger of two signals near the same FM frequency will be demodulated
- Motion capture, the process of recording movement and translating that movement onto a digital model
- Schematic capture, a step in electronic design automation at which the electronic schematic is created by a designer
  - Capture CIS, a software tool used for circuit schematic capture
- Screen capture (disambiguation), an image taken by the computer to record the visible items
- Video capture, the process of converting an analog video signal to digital form

== Other ==
- Capture (chess), to remove the opponent's piece from the board by taking it with one's own piece
- Capture fishery, a wild fishery in which the aquatic life is not controlled and needs to be captured or fished
- Regulatory capture, situations in which a government agency created to act in the public interest instead acts in favor of other interests
- Renault Captur, automobile model
- Rule of capture, common law that determines ownership of captured natural resources including groundwater, oil, gas and game animals
- State capture, a type of systemic political corruption in which private interests significantly influence a state's decision-making processes to their own advantage

== See also ==
- The Capture (disambiguation)
