= The Capture =

The Capture may refer to:

== Film and television ==
- The Capture (film), a 1950 drama film directed by John Sturges
- The Capture (TV series), a 2019 British mystery crime-drama series
- The Capture, a nominee for the 1976 Hugo Award for Best Dramatic Presentation

=== Television episodes ===
- "The Capture, Part 1" and "The Capture, Part 2", Animorphs season 1, episodes 9–10 (1998)
- "The Capture", Da Vinci's Inquest season 1, episode 13 (1999)
- "The Capture", Death Valley Days season 7, episode 2 (1958)
- "The Capture", Dick Turpin series 1, episode 2 (1979)
- "The Capture", Lady Lovely Locks and the Pixietails episode 8b (1987)
- "The Capture", The Adventures of Gulliver episode 3 (1968)

== Books ==
- The Capture, the first novel in the Guardians of Ga'Hoole book series by Kathryn Lasky
- The Capture (novel), the sixth book in the Animorphs series

== See also ==
- Capture (disambiguation)
