= Foreign Language Annals =

- Discipline: Linguistics
- Language: English
- Edited by: Julie Sykes

Publication details
- History: 1967; 59 years ago to present
- Publisher: Wiley-Blackwell on behalf of the American Council on the Teaching of Foreign Languages
- Frequency: Quarterly
- Impact factor: 1.782 (2018)

Standard abbreviations
- ISO 4: Foreign Lang. Ann.

Indexing
- ISSN: 0015-718X (print); 1944-9720 (web)
- LCCN: 75008931
- OCLC no.: 1334424

Links
- Journal homepage; Online access; Online archive

Foreign Language Annals is a quarterly peer-reviewed academic journal published by Wiley-Blackwell on behalf of the American Council on the Teaching of Foreign Languages. It was established in 1967 and covers research on language learning and teaching, focusing primarily on language education for languages other than English. The current editor-in-chief is Julie Sykes (University of Oregon).

According to the Journal Citation Reports, the journal has a 2018 impact factor of 1.782.
