= Mohammad Samimy =

Mohammad (‘Mo’) Samimy is the John B. Nordholt Professor of Mechanical and Aerospace Engineering and the founding director of the Aerospace Research Center (ARC) at Ohio State University (OSU). He has made significant contributions towards the understanding of the physics and control of high-speed and high Reynolds number turbulent shear flows and jet aeroacoustics.

Samimy has published over 300 technical papers, co-edited a book, A Gallery of Fluid Motion, and has two patents on aircraft jet noise mitigation. He has served on national committees and editorial boards and has lectured in the U.S. and abroad.

Samimy is a fellow of the American Institute of Aeronautics and Astronautics, the American Society of Mechanical Engineers, the American Physical Society, and the American Association for Advancement of Science. He is a recipient of the OSU Distinguished Scholar Award (2011) and the College of Engineering Scott Distinguished Educator Award (2013).
