= European Association for Computer-Assisted Language Learning =

EUROCALL, full name the European Association for Computer Assisted Language Learning, is a not-for-profit educational association devoted to the promotion of the use of information and communications technology in teaching and learning foreign languages: v. Davies G. (2004).

== History ==
EUROCALL was set up by a small group of enthusiasts in 1986, and in 1993 it was launched as an official association with the aid of European Commission funding, with Graham Davies as its Founder President (1993-2000).

== Conferences ==
A EUROCALL conference is held in August/September annually in a European country. Since 2006 the annual EUROCALL conference has included an online Virtual Strand for participants who are unable to attend the conference in person. Since 2012, the EUROCALL proceedings have been published in Open access by Research-publishing.net.

== Publications ==
The main publication of EUROCALL is ReCALL, which is a refereed journal published three times a year by Cambridge University Press. The online EUROCALL Review also appears at regular intervals.

== Administration ==
The administrative headquarters of EUROCALL moved from the University of Limerick to the University of Ulster in July 2010. The current President of EUROCALL is Mirjam Hauck, The Open University. The President is supported by an elected Executive Committee.

== Second Life ==
EUROCALL shares a virtual headquarters with CALICO in Second Life.

== Annual awards ==
EUROCALL offers the following annual awards:

- A Research Award that aims to encourage newcomers to research in the field of computer-assisted and technology-enhanced language learning by providing an opportunity to submit an original article for publication in the ReCALL journal.
- The János Kohn Scholarship, which commemorates and celebrates the life and work of János Kohn, a highly valued and respected EUROCALL colleague who died in March 1999. The annual scholarship enables a young teacher or researcher permanently based in a Central European member state to participate in a EUROCALL conference by providing funding towards the cost of attendance.

== Membership and affiliations ==
A total of 19 European states maintain national EUROCALL websites. A total of over 30 countries worldwide are represented in EUROCALL's membership.

EUROCALL is affiliated with its sister associations CALICO (Computer Assisted Language Instruction Consortium) and IALLT (International Association for Language Learning Technology) in the USA.

EUROCALL is also a member of WorldCALL.

== Special Interest Groups (SIGs) ==
EUROCALL currently has five Special Interest Groups:

- Computer Mediated Communication (CMC SIG)
- CorpusCALL
- EUROCALL/CALICO joint virtual worlds and serious games
- Mobile Assisted Language Learning (MALL SIG)
- Intelligent CALL (ICALL SIG)
- CALL Teacher Education SIG
- Graduate SIG

== See also ==
- Computer Assisted Language Learning
