= Otto Franke =

Otto Franke is the name of:

- Otto Franke (sinologist) (1863–1946), German historian of China
- Otto Franke (politician) (1877–1953), German Communist politician and labor activist

== See also ==
- Otto Frank (1889–1980), German businessman
- Otto Frank (physiologist) (1865–1944), German physiologist
- Otto Frankel (1900–1998), Austrian-born Australian geneticist
