= Vive (software) =

- Vive logo
- Original author: Tripod Technology GmbH
- Initial release: June 2014
- Final release: 3.0.4
- Operating system: iOS 7 or later
- Platform: iOS
- Available in: English; French; German; Italian; Japanese; Portuguese; Russian; Spanish
- Type: Social networking; video chat
- Website: vive.me

Vive is a members-only mobile video chat community. The company has offices in San Francisco, Berlin and Hannover. It is free to use.

== History ==
Vive was founded in Hannover by Arnd Aschentrup, Matthias Kleinmann and Tobias Dickmeis. All three had been involved in similar, formative projects prior to the creation of the app. Aschentrup worked with a number of companies in Germany's tech scene, co-founding Cyoshi Mobile GmbH with Dickmeis and later becoming Global COO of Mobile Streams.

The company entered beta-phase in June 2014 and launched its iOS app in September of the same year. In October 2014 an iPad version of Vive was released, the same month during which the company successfully secured a 1.5 million funding round from prominent European investors. Among them were Atlantic Internet GmbH, Hannover Beteiligungs Fond (HBF) and Mittelständische Beteiligungsgesellschaft Niedersachen (MBG).

== Features and membership ==
The app allows members to search for people within their locality as well as around the world. Upon logging into the app, members are presented with a list of other users, ranked on the basis of common interests and last log-in. The app aims to provide a platform for authentic, emotional and spontaneous connection between its members. It is reminiscent of the video-chatting websites Airtime and Chatroulette.

Potential members are asked how they would like to use Vive and what they can share with the community. A team of moderators then evaluate applicants based on their answers.

Vive users were able to connect in Facebook Spaces until Spaces was replaced by Facebook Horizon.
