= Language MOOC =

Online language course

Language MOOCs (Language Massive Open Online Courses, or LMOOCs) are web-based online courses freely accessible for a limited period of time, created for those interested in developing their skills in a foreign language. As Sokolik (2014) states, enrolment is large, free and not restricted to students by age or geographic location. They have to follow the format of a course, i.e., include a syllabus and schedule and offer the guidance of one or several instructors. The MOOCs are not so new, since courses with such characteristics had been available online for quite a lot of time before Dave Cormier coined the term 'MOOC' in 2008. Furthermore, MOOCs are generally regarded as the natural evolution of OERs (open educational resources), which are freely accessible materials used in Education for teaching, learning and assessment.

Although there seem to be very few examples of LMOOCs offered by MOOC providers, authors, such as Martín-Monje & Barcena (2014), argue that these open online courses can be effectively designed to facilitate the development of communicative language competences in potentially massive and highly heterogeneous groups, whose main shared interest is to learn a foreign language. Scholarly research is equally incipient in the field, with only two monographs published to date on the topic. These volumes, considered milestones of the emerging field, are based upon work taken from the well-established discipline of CALL (computer-assisted language learning), which has long proven the suitability of TELL (technology-enhanced language learning).

== History and emergence ==
The first LMOOCs started to appear in October 2012. Example courses include the three LMOOCs begun by the Spanish National Distance University (UNED). In relation to the English language, we have the LMOOC "Learn the first thousand words" (which had 45,102 students), and "Professional English" (with 33,588 students) and related to the German language, UNED offers the LMOOC "German for Spanish speakers" (with 22,438 students). The British Open University also started their Open Translation MOOC around the same time (they do not use the term "LMOOC" since it did not exist at that time). The course, "SpanishMOOC", integrated social media tools such as Skype and Google Hangouts in order to enhance synchronous oral interaction.

Another early example was Todd Bryant's joint launch of "English MOOC: Open Course for Spanish Speakers learning English" and "MOOC de Español: Curso abierto para hablantes de inglés que deseen mejorar su español" using his exchange website The Mixxer to connect language learners with native speakers for mutual exchanges. There have been some attempts to compile lists of LMOOC providers and available courses, but it seems like an impossible task to keep abreast of the constant changes in the MOOC panorama. Furthermore, LMOOCs seem to have received recently attention from governmental institutions and there is one European project that specifically focuses on LMOOCs, namely the LangMOOC project, as well as others, such as the ECO project, which include LMOOCs in their catalogue.

== Architectonics ==
In order to be effective, Read (2015) argues that LMOOCs require a set of tools and technologies that are appropriate for students to train the relevant receptive and productive language skills as they would in real world communicative situations. The possibilities for such technological mediation depend on the type of LMOOC proposed. There are several types of courses identified in the literature, but the two most common ones are cMOOCs and xMOOCs. The former, inspired by the notions of open education (techniques and resources), do not run on a single platform (but are distributed across many), promote immersion and interaction. The latter usually represent a continuation of other types of e-Learning courses that institutions have undertaken and, therefore, have a similar course structure, following standard face-to-face educational models.

For LMOOCs based upon an xMOOC platform, the resources and tools available for students typically include: textual materials in the form of Web pages, structured PDF files or URLs to content outside the platform, audiovisual recordings (often developed and stored on social video sites such as YouTube or Vimeo), tasks and exercises such as closed multiple-choice tests that are the basic evaluation mechanism, open answers, for example, based upon free writing, which can be compared to model answers or evaluated using peer-to-peer correction and, lastly, forums that represent a key component for learners to interact and practice mediated communication in the target language, providing a valuable mechanism for students to help each other and answers their peers' questions. For LMOOCs based upon the cMOOC model, a range of online Web 2.0 tools can be used so as to enable students to undertake the remixing, repurpose and co-create content and interaction, promoting the community nature of collaborative and social learning. xMOOC activities are typically highly structured and may not, as such, provide students with the communicative opportunity required to use what has just been seen and/or heard in an open and flexible way, including fine-grained feedback of different and complementary types. However, conversely, the often unstructured and constantly changing nature of cMOOCs together with, as Brennan (2014) notes, the cognitive load related to the sheer volume of information, number of tweets, posts, etc., available; the varying degrees of difficulty of activities (with little if any guidance available); and the need to use different tools and platforms, etc., can offer learners additional difficulties. Current research (Sokolik, 2014) attempts to combine the benefits of both types of model.

== New student and instructor profiles and roles ==
Castrillo de Larreta-Azelain (2014), being one of the first published papers that focuses on the roles, competences and methodological strategies of teachers in LMOOCs, on the basis of empirical research, identifies their main roles from a theoretical and practical standpoint. The proposed framework links to Salmon's theoretical tutoring model (Salmon, 2003) and is based on Hampel & Stickler's skills pyramid, (Hampel & Stickler, 2005) although focusing on Crompton's framework, (Crompton, 2009) which includes the three major sets of online language teaching: technology, pedagogy and evaluation.

The author's proposed model for redefining the teacher's role in this area is designed according to the different stages present in a LMOOC. The main task of the teaching teams in LMOOCs is shifted almost completely to the design and elaboration of the course before it actually takes place. It is argued that the instructional design necessary for the course requires a systematic, sequential plan based on Mastery Learning that consists of four steps. Moreover, the application of heuristic strategies to help present and transmit the contents of the course is suggested.

In LMOOCs, teachers need to become curators, facilitators, leaders and administrators, solving problems, suggesting complementary material, moderating forums, motivating students, and overseeing the whole learning experience during the course. Finally, before, during, and after the LMOOC, instructors are also researchers, collectors, and analyzers of learners' data.

As for students, Anderson et al.(2014) identify five different possible roles that MOOC participants can adopt:

"1. Viewers, who primarily watch lectures, handing in few – if any – assignments. 2. Solvers, who mainly hand in assignments for a grade, viewing few – if any – of the audiovisual materials. 3. All-rounders, those who balance the watching of the videos with the handing in of assignments. 4. Collectors, who mostly download lectures, handing in a few assignments. Unlike the viewers, they may or may not be actually watching the lectures. 5. Bystanders, those who registered for the course but may not even log in at all."

== Accessibility ==
MOOCs are examples of the evolution of e-Learning environments towards a more revolutionary computer and mobile-based scenario along with social technologies that will lead to the emergence of new kinds of learning applications that enhance communication and collaboration processes. These applications should take advantage of the unique conditions of mobility and the ubiquity of Internet access, exploring successful actions for education. However, the access to MOOC platforms still present barriers, there is also a lack of accessibility on the learning resources, the communicating tools, and even less personalized user interfaces. All these issues present definitively barriers that add extra difficulties, such as the need to develop specific digital or even social skills for students with functional diversity.

Students using assistive technologies may have problems while navigating in the MOOC environment, accessing the platform (registration process), and even using the learning content contained in the platform. A driving force has been precisely the beneficial application of multimedia and audiovisual content in the area of education to favor language learning, the majority of web applications and pages are based on collections of shared visual and audio-visual resources (such as Flickr or YouTube). MOOCs are also full of video-presentations, animations, automatic self-assessment (some of them multimedia-based) integrated into them. This introduction of audiovisual content into e-Learning platforms adds a new difficulty to the accessibility requirements since they include new elements that widen the digital divide and not only for people with disabilities. How MOOCs are designed, how their interfaces work, how communication is handled, how assessments take place (for instance, the way a student has to record his/her audio for a language speaking recording) and what form the learning content takes, all issues impact on the accessibility of these systems. The challenge for any language learning environment is one of accessibility in terms of the community with whom it wishes to engage, ensuring that processes such as enrolling in a course, navigating the system, accessing learning and assessment materials, and peer interacting are achievable through the use of assistive technologies. Moreover, in accessible language learning there are still some challenges to be faced, namely:

- Readability: the precise identification of theoretical concepts should be to provide audio and images through the combination of text (which should be correctly semantically tagged).
- Personalisation: the MOOC platforms must be capable of user's personalization, in terms of: profile selection, colors, enough contrast, voice-activated assistants) that will help to capture student's attention.
- Means for communication: anxiety is one of the main variables that affect students with disabilities while facing this type of learning. As much communication tools are provided, the disorder is diminished.
- Intelligibility: in speech communication, intelligibility is a measure of how comprehensible speech is in given conditions and is negatively impacted by background noise and reverberation.

A MOOC interface design is often determined by the platform since some of the features – learning and testing tools – cannot be edited or customized by the academic assistants. Its materials and its mode of delivery might adhere to a set of accessibility standards. The majority of learning activities undertaken continues to take place using some hardware/software that was not designed for its specific use with educational applications and, hence, usability issues often arise. Moreover, there are technical problems or incompatibility, when it is not possible to have the required technology, or it is not possible to obtain materials in alternative formats. Moreover, MOOC environments typically contain a variety of components that do not always share a consistency of interface logic or interactive elements, ranging from posts in a forum, making up elements in tests or timed quizzes through playing embedded videos or downloading a variety of document formats. Video lectures are key elements in the MOOC model, and the hurdles of interacting with the platform or content should be minimized. However, alternative accessible formats, subtitles, and/or sign language interpreters for audiovisual materials, audio-description recordings are not easily available even though there exist great guidelines, such as Sánchez (2013).

The pedagogical and visual design of the MOOCs, their information architecture, usability and visual and interaction design could be having a negative impact on student engagement, retention and completion rates as it has been previously analyzed in adult learning. Whilst designing a service based on MOOCs to be used by people with functional diversity, it is important to consider the accessibility level of each of the parts of the system and also the role of the meta-information related to functional diversity, for instance, to define specific user profiles.

Although the usual accessibility barriers may remain, the model of large scale participation and social accessibility could be used to support special needs users by providing peer assistance in terms of study skills, content adaption and remote assistance. If enough interaction between users exists, students within the system can learn from their fellow students and make a contribution by helping their fellow students. In the end, resources can be media enriched, achieving a greater level of quality: transcriptions for mind mapping, audio recordings for podcasting, etc. All resources grouped together into learning resource collections that will benefit all of the stakeholders and the variety of the ubiquitous processes.

MOOCs provide flexible language learning that allows participants to study at their own time, place and pace. This facilitates continuous communication and interaction among learners, supporting knowledge sharing and community building. This especially benefits disadvantaged groups as language proficiency can improve their employability.

== Challenges ==
The MOOC model, while opening up education to a larger audience, also faces difficulties that will have to be overcome before they can replace other approaches to online teaching and learning. Some of these challenges are general to all MOOCs and others, as claimed by Barcena et al.(2014), are specific to language courses. Regarding the former, given that most courses are essentially xMOOCs, then they are intended to provide the same learning experience to all students who undertake them, thereby limiting possibilities for individual instruction and personalized learning. A further problem is that of student assessment, how to do it and how to prevent cheating, closed tests are typically used but lack the flexibility of open written / oral answers. High dropout rates and the associated lack of participation within the forums also limit the possibilities for collaborative learning, so necessary for the development of many different competences. Finally, the economic issue of how to cover the expenses of preparing, running and managing a course. The former or specific challenges of a Language MOOC reflect the nature of learning a language as a skill acquisition process as well as one of knowledge assimilation, where the students need to actually use and apply the linguistic structures which they are learning in a realistic setting with quality (near-) native feedback.

Research on language MOOCs and related technologies and methods has proposed ways to address some of these challenges, such as increasing student motivation and involving learners in activities that develop their second-language skills. As in other areas of online learning, mobile devices play a growing role, leading to the concept of mobile-assisted LMOOCs (MALMOOCs). In this model, smartphones and tablets serve not only as portable course clients but also as sensor-enabled, app-based tools that can extend language learning into everyday activities. Other educational technologies discussed in relation to LMOOCs include learning analytics, gamification, personal learning networks, and adaptive and automated assessment.
