= Promova =

Language learning platform

- Type: Private company
- Industry: Education
- Founded: April 2019
- Founder: Andrew Skrypnyk; Mykhailo Galian; Valeria Vakulska
- Headquarters: Limassol, Cyprus, Kyiv, Ukraine
- Number of employees: 130+
- Website: https://promova.com/

Promova (in English: /prɔˈmɔvʌ/) is a Ukrainian-born language learning platform for multilingual learners focused on speaking confidence, adaptive learning, and real-life communication. The platform operates on a freemium model, offering free core content with a paid premium subscription for advanced features. Starting in 2024, language courses include AI learning tools for conversational practice and pronunciation recognition.

== History ==
Promova was launched in 2019. Before that, the company was known as Ten Words, the app evolved into a comprehensive language-learning platform by 2022 and was rebranded as "Promova", which is translated as “speech” from Ukrainian.

In 2021, Andrew Skrypnyk, the company's CEO, was awarded 30 under 30 by Forbes Ukraine.

In May 2023, Promova launched its Korean language course. The version was created by Elly Kim, a linguist with Korean roots living in Ukraine.

On August 24, 2023, the Independence Day of Ukraine, Promova launched a Ukrainian language course, including 48 bite-sized lessons and flashcards with information about Ukrainian culture.

In October 2023, Promova became the first language-learning platform to release a Dyslexia mode, designed to make it easier for people with dyslexia to learn a new language. The mode uses Dysfont, a specialized typeface created by dyslexic designer Martin Pysny. In 2024, Promova updated its accessibility features to include a customizable Dyslexia Mode and a white noise tool for learners with ADHD.

In November 2023, Promova provided all Ukrainians with three years of free access to its language courses as part of Ukraine's Future Perfect national program. This initiative, launched by the Ukrainian government and the Ministry of Digital Transformation, supports President Zelenskyy's law recognizing English as the official language of international communication and aims to improve English proficiency among Ukrainians.

In December 2023, Promova was recognized as one of the 25 most prominent Ukrainian startups by Forbes magazine.

In April 2024, On National ASL Day in the US, Promova launched a free American Sign Language course. A part of the course covers communication in emergencies such as asking for help, warning about fire, and expressing the need to call the police or a doctor.

In 2024, the platform launched the "Promova for Good" initiative in Brazil, partnering with local organizations to provide free language training for underprivileged youth and women-led startups.

In 2024 and 2025, Promova won the 2024 EdTechX Awards in the Language learning category.

In March 2025, Fast Company named Promova to its annual World's Most Innovative Companies 2025 list. In April 2025, TIME, in partnership with Statista, included Promova in its World's Top EdTech Companies of 2025.

In January 2026, Promova partnered with boxer Oleksandr Usyk and sports-tech ecosystem Ready to Fight, appointing Usyk as honorary Chief Discipline Officer and introducing themed in-app learning courses.

== Product and services ==
Promova's structured curriculum covers vocabulary, grammar, reading, listening, and speaking through short-form lessons. The app is available on iOS, Android, and desktop web, and operates on a freemium model with a premium subscription tier.

The platform includes several machine learning and artificial intelligence features for speech evaluation and conversational practice. These features include an automated speaking assessment that grades English proficiency using CEFR standards, and a pronunciation practice tool powered by an internal machine learning model. The service also provides an interactive AI Tutor that gives text and voice feedback on grammar, as well as AI Role-Play scenarios for practicing fluency and accuracy. For accessibility, the app features a dedicated "Dyslexia Mode" launched in October 2023, which utilizes the specialized Dysfont typeface to improve readability for learners with dyslexia.

As of 2026, Promova has 13 language learning courses: English, Spanish, LATAM Spanish, Italian, Portuguese, French, German, Ukrainian, Arabic, Korean, Chinese, Japanese and ASL.
