= Language exchange =

Partners teaching each other their native language

A language exchange is a relationship between two or more people who have interactions around the exchange of language. People typically join into a language exchange to gain practice in a target language. Other reasons for joining might include cultural exchange or companionship. Partners of a language exchange are usually native speakers of each other's target language. Meetings between language exchange partners can be held in person or via video conferencing platforms. Potential challenges of language exchanges can involve differing motivations, cultural miscommunications or scheduling conflicts. Language exchanges are sometimes called Tandem language learning.

In modern contexts, a language exchange most often refers to the mutual teaching of partners' first languages. Language exchanges are generally considered helpful for developing language proficiency, especially in speaking fluency and listening comprehension. Language exchanges that take place through writing or text chats also improve reading comprehension and writing ability. The aim of language exchange is to develop and increase language knowledge and intercultural skills. This is usually done through social interaction with the native speaker. Given that language exchanges generally take place between native speakers of different languages, they may also improve participants' cross-cultural communication skills.

== History ==
This practice has long been used by individuals to exchange knowledge of foreign languages. For example, John Milton gave Roger Williams an opportunity to practise Hebrew, Greek, Latin, and French, while receiving lessons in Dutch in exchange. Language exchange first came about in the early 1800s where school aged children in England were introduced to the newly set up program. Countries such as Belgium and Switzerland found the language exchange program very easy to run as there were many languages spoken in the one country. French and German youth picked up language exchange in 1968 which then spread to Turkey and Madrid.

== In education ==
American universities are increasingly experimenting with language exchanges as part of the language learning curriculum. In this respect, language exchanges have a similar role as study abroad programs and language immersion programs in creating an environment where the language student must use the foreign language for genuine communication outside of a classroom setting. In such programs, international and American students can be paired up with one another so they may then freely organize meetings that permit opportunities for communication and intercultural exchange. In other examples of university language exchange programs students may join for practices like language tutoring, conversation groups, or social gatherings.

== Technology ==
Most language exchanges are set up through language learning websites and applications with platforms that accommodate the search and selection of potential language partners. Many of these networks offer the opportunity for language partner selections based not only on target language, but also country of origin, gender, age, and language proficiency level of a potential partner. Examples of these include HelloTalk and Tandem.

Language learning social networks offer language students the opportunity to find language partners from around the world. Many such platforms allow language exchange partners to text, as well as speak to one another through voice or video calls. Partners may also decide to communicate via instant messengers, voice-over-IP technologies, or other telecommunications platforms. Location and means permitting, connected partners may also later elect to meet in person.

Advances in language learning social networks have provided an outlet for foreign language students who previously had difficulty locating opportunities to practice their target language. Language exchange platforms often offer partnerships, with some offering as many as several million users. The diversity among the countries of origin for potential partners can mean the opportunity to experience a myriad of linguistic and cultural exchanges.

== Benefits ==
=== Linguistic help ===
Language exchanges have been viewed as a helpful tool to aid language learning at learning institutions and among individual learners. The benefit of most language exchanges is that they are often performed between native speakers. Practice with native speakers can not only provide more robust opportunities for feedback regarding linguistic elements such as pronunciation, grammar, and vocabulary, but also authentic listening practice.

=== Cultural exchange ===
Another major benefit of language exchange is the exposure to the native speaker's culture. Not only does learning about the culture of locations where one's target language is spoken enhance their overall linguistic abilities, it can also serve to broaden their intercultural communication skills.

=== Informal environment ===
Language exchanges can provide a friendly and informal environment for new language learners. Both speakers are trying to learn and understand, and such an atmosphere can reduce pressure on either partner. This also gives the learning environment a fun and productive atmosphere. An additional benefit is that people are learning faster when they have a one-on-one connection with the "teacher".

=== Ready partners ===
Many people choose to learn one-on-one but struggle try to find a teacher. Native speakers who are helping these people have been documented feeling a new sense of motivation, as they are now responsible for teaching this person.

=== Free of charge ===
Because both partners of a language exchange are generally seeking help with their language skills, usually neither partner compensates the other for the assistance they receive. A setup whereby only one partner provides help or is compensated for their services would typically not be referred to as a language exchange.

== Challenges ==
=== Differing motivations ===
Online relationships can give rise to many of the same complications that may exist in real-life relationships. Sometimes remote language partners can have different motivations for joining into a language exchange. It can be disappointing when a partner's goals for the relationship conflict with one's own; such disagreement of purpose can lead to an end of a language partnership.

=== Incompatibility ===
Personality mismatches can be as prevalent in online relationships as they can be in offline ones. Unresolved incompatibility issues can be even more difficult to overcome in remote relationships, however, and related factors can cause one or more participants of a language exchange to either gradually or abruptly withdraw from the relationship.

=== Cultural miscommunications ===
Miscommunications can occur in any type of relationship, but they can be even more common between people from different cultures. Those who either anticipate or are otherwise prepared to deal with such misunderstandings may be better equipped for navigating online relationships with people of other cultures.

=== Scheduling ===
Scheduling difficulties can exist between language partners from different regions throughout the world. Meetings between people located in different time zones can be an inconvenient fact of some language exchanges. In such cases, partners may need to compromise to select a meeting time which is not too disruptive to either person's schedule.

== See also ==
- Language education
- Community language learning
- Language immersion
- Language acquisition
- Communicative language teaching
- Online learning community

== Weblinks ==
- Free material database of Tandem Foundation
