= Basic linguistic theory =

Basic linguistic theory (BLT) is a term coined by R. M. W. Dixon to describe the theoretical framework and basic concepts that is generally used in grammatical description of languages, and in linguistic typology.

It is not always considered to be a theory, but is used in so-called "theory neutral" language description. Proponents of basic linguistic theory as theory point out that it is a set of concepts and theoretical assumptions that has been accumulated from empirical investigation of the world's languages. However, critics will posit that there is no part of basic linguistic terminology that all linguists in the world agree about.
