= Screen capture =

Screen capture may refer to:

- Screenshot, an image file which shows the content of a computer's screen at the moment of shot
- Screencast, also known as a video screen capture, a digital recording of computer screen output, often containing audio narration
