= Community language learning =

Language-teaching approach

Community language learning (CLL) is a language-teaching approach focused on group-interest learning.

It is based on the counselling-approach in which the teacher acts as a counselor and a paraphraser, while the learner is seen as a client and collaborator.

== Background ==
The CLL approach was developed by Charles Arthur Curran, a Jesuit priest, professor of psychology at Loyola University Chicago, and counseling specialist.

According to Curran, a counselor helps a client understand his or her own problems better by "capturing the essence of the clients concern ...[and] relating [the client's] affect to cognition..."; in effect, understanding the client and responding in a detached yet considerate manner.

== Methods ==
=== Online communities ===
These types of communities have recently arisen with the explosion of educational resources for language learning on the Web.

== See also ==
- Language education
- Language MOOC
