= Immerse Learning =

- Industry: Technology, Virtual Reality
- Founded: 2005
- Defunct: 2025
- Headquarters: London, UK
- Area served: Global - Online
- Services: Business Virtual Reality and Tools
- Number of employees: 20
- Website: immerse.io

Immerse Learning (formerly called Languagelab.com) is an English school based in an online virtual world. It is the first school that teaches exclusively online in a virtual environment; students and teachers use avatars to navigate the environment and take part in lessons. Lessons are also completely contextual, which is in direct contradiction to the traditional classroom system.

In 2016, Immerse moved their focus away from desktop training to developing a VR platform aimed at large enterprises that need to scale their VR training across multiple locations and users.

== History ==
Immerse Learning was founded in 2005 as Languagelab.com in London by David Kaskel and Shiv Rajendran. Having been amazed at how quickly foreign players had picked up language skills in MMORPGs, Kaskel began to look into how learning took place in video games. To date, Languagelab.com has 80 employees based in 14 different countries and caters to about 1000 students (2011).

Languagelab.com teaches English to students from more than seventy countries.

In 2011, Languagelab.com announced a partnership with Pearson Education to produce a virtual world product for Business English. The product is called Market Leader Live and contains content from the Financial Times.

In February 2014, Languagelab.com relaunched as Immerse Learning with a proprietary immersive learning platform designed specifically for corporate and higher education programmes.

In 2016, Immerse Learning changed its name to Immerse and their web address is now Immerse.io. Immerse provide businesses with ready-made VR scenarios or with software and tools to create their own. Current clients include Shell, DHL, GE Healthcare and QinetiQ.

== Methodology ==
Languagelab.com's current methods are based on an internal research and development program led by Rajendran, spanning from 2005 to 2008 involving testing a range of models of teaching with students from more than 50 countries. Based on immersive learning, the idea that all lessons should be taught contextually and uses virtual environments to recreate the scenarios where interactions would take place in the real world. Experts believe that virtual worlds and immersive learning are far more effective for studying higher order cognitive lessons "Generative Learning" than the traditional classroom based system, which is taught in abstraction. Modern research suggests this method of learning is more effective than traditional methodology in which new words are introduced gradually through abstraction. This method is similar to Situated cognition.

All teaching is done in real time by real teachers. Languagelab employs a mix of teachers and actors who appear as avatars to help guide learners through a range of simulated "real life" situations. Students can develop communication skills by working as a team on such tasks as tackling an oil rig explosion and the resulting environmental catastrophes or more conventional courses. Languagelab.com has developed adaptive learning algorithms and on-demand class creation practices that provide each student a tailored program to meet their needs.

== English City ==
English City is a virtual city created on Second Life where all the language classes take place. It seeks to mimic the learning process that gamers undergo in video games. The premise is that in video games players learn how to play through participation, and are taught new skills in situ. Players also receive instant feedback from their actions throughout the game; the penalty for failure is minimal as the player gets the chance to immediately try the mission again. These qualities allow players to learn far quicker than if they were given a class on the subject.

English City contains numerous settings for students to practice English in both classes and in their own time, including an airport, cafes, hotels, museums and galleries, and even clubs and bars. The city is also populated by English speaking actors, who are there for the students to practice their English.

"Students who visit English City (pictured), a language-teaching program, can chat to passers-by as they wander through the streets, meet their tutors’ avatars in virtual cafés and order snacks from Pebbles, an aspiring actress played by a teacher"

== Virtual Reality ==
Immerse has now moved away from Second Life, concentrating on creating their own virtual reality simulations for businesses to use for training and as a sales tool. Their Unity based Software Development Kit is currently undergoing a Beta Trial with several companies and educational institutions. When finalised and released the SDK will allow for many more companies to create their own content for virtual reality without relying on a design or development agency.

== Closure ==
Immerse Learning Limited entered administration in June 2025 following a period of severe financial distress driven by high development costs and a failure to secure necessary funding. Despite raising approximately £19 million over its lifetime to develop its Virtual Reality platform, the company remained loss-making, recording an operating loss of over £570,000 in the first four months of 2025 alone. The situation became critical when attempts to raise £2-4 million in new external investment failed despite marketing to over 260 potential investors, and key enterprise clients terminated their contracts between late 2024 and early 2025. Unable to service its debts or maintain a "Time to Pay" arrangement with HMRC for over £740,000 in unpaid taxes, the directors concluded the company was insolvent.

Amidst this turmoil, Tom Symonds, the CEO and a director since 2012, had his appointment terminated on 25 October 2024. His departure coincided with the loss of significant client contracts and the company's inability to secure fresh capital, marking a pivotal shift in leadership shortly before the collapse. With no other viable options to rescue the business as a going concern, the remaining board appointed administrators on 10 June 2025. They immediately completed a "pre-pack" sale of specific assets—including the platform and intellectual property—to XcceleratoR Limited, a connected party controlled by former directors, for £280,000.

The administration has left a substantial amount of debt that will not be repaid. The administrator's report disclosed an estimated total deficiency of approximately £8.5 million as regards members, meaning shareholders have lost their entire investment. While the secured creditor may receive a partial distribution from the asset sale, there is a significant shortfall, and unsecured creditors—including staff, trade suppliers and HMRC—are expected to receive no return on their debts. The sale proceeds were insufficient to cover the company's extensive liabilities, leaving the majority of creditors with significant losses.
