= CALICO (consortium) =

Computer Assisted Language Instruction Consortium
- Abbreviation: CALICO
- Founded: 1983; 43 years ago
- Type: Nonprofit corporation
- Purpose: computer technology in second/foreign language learning and teaching
- Location: San Marcos, Texas, U.S.
- Website: https://www.calico.org

CALICO Journal
- Language: English
- Edited by: Bryan Smith, Ana Oskoz

Publication details
- History: 1983–present
- Publisher: Equinox Publishers
- Frequency: Triannual

Standard abbreviations
- ISO 4: CALICO J.

Indexing
- ISSN: 2056-9017

Links
- Journal homepage

CALICO, The Computer Assisted Language Instruction Consortium, is a North American-based international scholarly organization, founded in 1983, dedicated to research and development in the use of computer technology in second/foreign language learning and teaching. CALICO has developed alongside the field of CALL or Computer Assisted Language Learning, and includes language educators, educational technology professionals, language technology consultants and language center directors, software designers and developers, and second language acquisition researchers, as well as graduate students in these fields. CALICO special interest groups, which reflect the changing nature of the field, currently include graduate students, gaming, artificial intelligence (formerly 'intelligent CALL'), language teaching and learning technologies, second language acquisition and technology, teacher education, and immersive realities.

CALICO holds an annual conference with workshops at universities and in cities across North America, and has an official presence at related conferences worldwide, as well as relationships with other organizations like ACTFL, IALLT, and EuroCALL. Partnering with Equinox Publishers, it also publishes a book series as well as a scholarly, online-only, fully referenced journal, CALICO Journal.

CALICO is governed by three elected leaders serving one-year rotating terms (President, Vice-President, and Past President), along with a board of six members serving three-year terms.
