= Tandem language learning =

Tandem language learning is an approach to language acquisition that involves reciprocal language exchange between tandem partners. In this method, each learner ideally serves as a native speaker of the language the other person intends to learn. Tandem language learning deviates from traditional pedagogical practices by eliminating the teacher-student model. Numerous language schools worldwide, including those affiliated with TANDEM International, as well as several universities, incorporate this approach into their language programs.

== Background ==
Tandem language learning encompasses various methods of instruction. The most prevalent form involves face-to-face meetings between participants (referred to as face-to-face tandem). With the advent of communication technology in the 1990s, etandem (also known as distance tandem) emerged, facilitating language practice through email correspondence and written communication. Tele-collaboration emphasizes cultural integration and intercultural understanding as integral components of language learning. Tandem exchanges are characterized by reciprocal autonomy, with participants engaging in mutual language learning. Time is equally divided to ensure a fair distribution of language exchange.

Through partnerships with native speakers and exposure to social and cultural experiences, participants become fully immersed in the target language and culture. Learning is supported through various means, such as worksheets, textbooks, or informal conversations. The tandem method serves different purposes, including self-directed tandem partnerships (involving two individuals supported by counselors) and binational tandem courses (designed for groups and facilitated by moderators). The prerequisite for participating in self-directed Tandem is a lower intermediate level of language proficiency (lower B1 threshold in the Common European Framework of Reference for languages).

== History ==
The concept of "language learning by exchange" or the "tandem approach" encompasses various teaching systems for exchange students abroad, including partner learning, peer teaching, tutoring models, and "Zweierschaften" (Steinig) or 'one-on-one discipleship'.

Here are some key points:

In the early 19th century, Joseph Lancaster and Andrew Bell introduced the "mutual system" in England, which involved students assisting each other in school, complementing the teacher's role. Peter Petersen, a German educationalist, developed a similar approach in the "Jenaplan schools," and tutoring models inspired by this concept emerged in the USA from the 1960s onwards.

The "tandem" concept, where two individuals learn the same language together, first appeared in 1971 in connection with Wambach's "audio-visual method." It was later applied to binational German-French youth meetings.

Klaus Lieb-Harkort and Nükhet Cimilli introduced this model in their work with immigrants in the German-Turkish area of Munich. Similar courses were subsequently offered in Bremen, Frankfurt, and Zürich.

In 1979, Jürgen Wolff developed the tandem learning partner mediation for Spanish and German. This course program, along with one developed by Wolff and colleagues in Madrid, formed the foundation of the TANDEM network, which later became the TANDEM schools network.

Since 1983, the TANDEM model has been adopted as an alternative language learning method, with elements of language courses abroad, youth exchange programs, cultural tours, class correspondence, and other cross-border activities replicated in selective schools across Europe.

The TANDEM network collaborates with various educational institutions, including the E-Tandem Network, which was founded in 1992 and later renamed the International E-Mail Tandem Network in 1993.

TANDEM Fundazioa, headquartered in Donostia/San Sebastian, Spain, was established in 1994 to promote scientific cooperation, education, and advanced training.

In 2016, Tripod Technology GmbH obtained a license from TANDEM Fundazioa to create the Tandem app.

The majority of schools affiliated with the TANDEM Network formed the association 'TANDEM International," with its headquarters in Bremen, Germany. Since March 2014, TANDEM International has owned the 'TANDEM' brand.

== Cormier Method ==
The Cormier method, developed by Helene Cormier, a language teacher at the Club d'échange linguistique de Montréal (CELM), is an instructional approach that promotes in-tandem learning among small groups of learners with different native languages. The method focuses on engaging participants in conversations aimed at strengthening listening, comprehension, vocabulary, and pronunciation skills.

During the language exchange, participants have the opportunity to interact with native speakers through text, voice, and video chat. Each session typically lasts around one hour, with participants speaking in one language for thirty minutes and then switching to the other language for the remaining thirty minutes. This experience allows learners to gain insights into their peers' cultures while using the target language appropriately.

To conduct effective sessions using the Cormier method, the following recommendations should be considered:

1. Properly utilizing a timer to manage time allocation.
2. Taking responsibility for one's own learning when speaking in a second language
3. Being sensitive to the needs of partners when speaking in one's own language
4. Focusing on communication rather than constantly correcting grammar.
5. Being considerate of others

Advantages of the Cormier method include the opportunity for focused practice in small groups, pre-designed lesson plans and engaging activities to enhance motivation, real-time communication with native speakers, and the ability to access sessions from anywhere with an internet connection. A virtual timer helps manage and allocate practice time for each participant.

However, disadvantages could be that the method is more suitable for intermediate and advanced learners, as native speakers without teaching backgrounds may struggle to assist beginners. Additionally, participants from different educational backgrounds and levels of knowledge may encounter communication challenges in communication. Accessibility can also be an issue in certain countries.

== Drawbacks to tandem language learning ==
Tandem language learning is a concept that offers potential linguistic and cultural advantages. It allows students of different nationalities to learn from each other without any financial cost. However, there are several factors that can hinder its effectiveness.

One reason is the limited availability of foreign students interested in studying minority languages, such as Polish or Maltese. Even if speakers of minority languages are interested in learning more widely spoken languages like English or German, they may struggle to find tandem partners who share their interest. Minority languages often have limited demand in the global market for foreign languages.

Another challenge is the expertise of participants, which can be influenced by two factors. First, native speakers may lack sufficient knowledge to effectively teach their own language. Second, students themselves may face difficulties in designing meaningful learning experiences due to a lack of methodological and pedagogical skills. Error correction during tandem programs can also disrupt the flow of conversation and create anxieties for novice learners, impacting their fluency and confidence in the foreign language.

The design of tasks and integration of online language interaction within the learning process and curriculum can significantly impact the effectiveness of tandem language learning. Poorly designed tasks and a lack of pedagogical leadership can diminish the value of the approach for both students and teachers.

Technology also poses challenges. Certain conferencing technologies, like Skype, may result in miscommunication due to non-alignment of visual input and output. Students may appear socially absent or interrupt the usual process of indicating social presence, affecting communication. Misusing technology can lead to exclusion from the conversation.

Cultural issues can arise during tandem programs when comparing cultures. Students may express subjective opinions and reinforce intercultural stereotypes, creating a hostile discourse and disrupting the flow of conversations. Without teacher interventions, tele-tandem interactions may become shallow performances that rely on preconceived representations of oneself and others. Preconceptions about the other learner's culture can also impact proactive attitudes and participation levels in the exchange.

Addressing these challenges requires careful consideration and pedagogical support to ensure that tandem language learning maximizes its potential benefits while minimizing potential drawbacks.
