= Memrise =

Language learning platform

- Website type: Privately held company
- Available in: Arabic, Chinese, Danish, Dutch, English, French, German, Indonesian, Italian, Japanese, Korean, Norwegian, Polish, Portuguese, Russian, Spanish, Swedish, Turkish, Ukrainian, and Vietnamese and more than 130 other languages
- Founded: 2010
- Area served: Worldwide
- Founders: Greg Detre; Ed Cooke; Ben Whately
- CEO: Ben Whately
- Website: memrise.com (community courses)
- Registration: Yes
- Launched: September 2010
- Current status: Active

Memrise is a British language learning app with courses in over 140 languages. It is based in London, UK.

Memrise is known for using native-speaker videos of locals pronouncing words and phrases. The Memrise App has courses for learners preparing for IELTS, GCSE and A-LEVEL exams and uses AI to provide test takers with feedback. User-generated content is available in the app, listed as "community word lists" and has many more languages, including minority and ancient languages. As of 2026, the app had over 87 million registered users.

== History ==
Memrise was founded by Ed Cooke, a Grand Master of Memory; Ben Whately; and Greg Detre, a Princeton neuroscientist specializing in the science of memory and forgetting. The website launched in private beta after winning the Princeton Entrepreneurship Club 2009 TigerLaunch competition.

In July 2010, Memrise was named as one of the winners of the London Mini-Seedcamp competition. In November 2010, the site was named as one of the finalists for the 2010 TechCrunch Europas Start-up of the Year. In March 2011, it was selected as one of the Techstars Boston startups. In May 2017, Memrise was named as the winner of the "Best App" award at the second edition of the Google Play awards.

As of May 2013, a Memrise app has been available for download on both the App Store (iOS) and Google Play.

As of January 2020, the app received $21.8 million of investments in a total of seven seed rounds.

== Features ==
=== Spaced repetition ===
Memrise makes language studying a game, like its competitor Duolingo. Memrise uses spaced repetition to accelerate language acquisition. Spaced repetition is an evidence-based learning technique that incorporates increasing intervals of time between subsequent review of previously learned material to exploit the psychological spacing effect. The use of spaced repetition has been shown to increase the rate of memorization.

=== Community courses ===
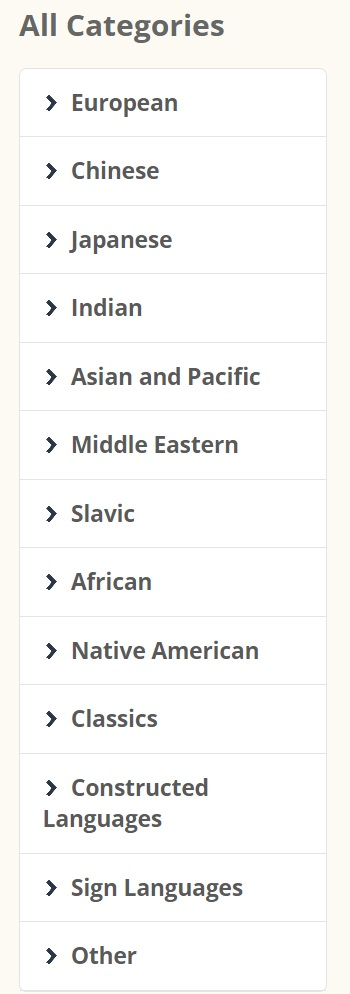
The catalogue of community courses on the Memrise website. The available languages are grouped by geographical regions. For instance, Persian courses are under "Middle Eastern", while "Asian and Pacific" encompasses languages from Mongolian to Marshallese.

Users of the platform have the ability to create personalized "courses," which consist of curated lists of words and phrases that can be accompanied by audio and pictures. These courses can be used for individual learning purposes or shared with the community by making them publicly available in the course catalogue. This feature has led to the accumulation of a diverse range of "community courses" over time, which has proven useful for studying languages with limited resources or those of niche interest, in addition to the more popular languages.

In 2012, less than two years after its launch, Memrise had already crowdsourced materials for about 100 languages, "from Catalan to Haitian Creole." Courses have been created by enthusiasts to teach Klingon, Toki Pona, and Esperanto, among other artificial languages. Classical languages, such as Latin and Ancient Greek, have been covered as well.

In Taiwan, the Department of Education of Keelung City Government has taken initiatives to foster the education of indigenous and local languages by publishing Memrise-based learning materials for the Amis, Taroko, Taiwanese Hakka, and Taiwanese Hokkien languages. Journalist Joshua Foer, in an attempt to communicate with the Pygmy peoples in the Congo Basin, was able to pick up Lingala, a language with scarce learning materials, by utilizing community courses.

Speech communities of endangered languages have made use of the platform to aid in their revitalization endeavors, as seen in the case of Ume Sámi, a language spoken by fewer than 50 people in Sweden. In the United States, indigenous nations have published courses on Memrise to support efforts to revitalize their heritage languages, including Cherokee, Seneca, Comanche, Potawatomi, and Choctaw. The success of this project "inspired the start of similar projects among speakers of other Indigenous languages," like Unangam Qilinĝingin to teach the Aleut language spoken in Alaska. Courses of many other endangered languages can be found, including the other Sámi languages, Hawaiian, Yiddish, Cornish, Greenlandic, Navajo, Irish, and Welsh.

The Institute on Collaborative Language Research, founded at the University of California, organized a workshop in 2018 to teach participants to use Memrise for teaching and learning endangered languages with the aim of revitalization, considering that Memrise is "an ideal tool for language revitalization because it’s flexible, community-oriented, easy-to-use, fun, and free" and "a great way for fluent elders and more tech-savvy young people to collaborate on a revitalization project". A research conducted by NEȾOLṈEW̱, a Canadian partnership working on indigenous language revitalization, praises the motivational effect of Memrise' leaderboard for learners, but raises concerns about the issue of data sovereignty. In 2023, the successes of the Memrise projects for Ume Sámi and Kristang were cited as "inspiring stories" by the UNESCO publication Digital initiatives for indigenous languages.

Apart from resources for language learning, the community has produced courses for other subject matters, including geography, history, mathematics, natural science, some designed for general interests and some for test preparation.

In July 2024, Memrise announced in a blog-post that community courses will be removed from their new app experience, moving them to a separate platform.

=== "Mems" ===
An example of a "mem" for learners of English: the word "seethe" is remembered as an angry face grinding its teeth, matching its pronunciation to its meaning.

An example of a "mem" for the Chinese character 面, which means "noodles"

Memrise used to have a function known as "mems," which are user-generated mnemonic devices or memory aids to help learners remember and retain new information more effectively. Mems are often designed to be humorous or even absurd to be memorable, such as using a picture of Abraham Lincoln listening to a ghetto blaster with the caption "Abe ends work in the evening" for the German word Abend, which means "evening". For learning Chinese characters, mems have been created to help relate their meaning and the concept they represent.

In 2012, Ed Cooke highlighted the network effect associated with learning through mems, explaining that "the more people on the site, the more there are contributing new content for the mems". In 2013, Ben Whately and Ed Cooke discussed their team's approach to take advantage of the Internet obsession with cats and "the relationship between cuteness and improved cognitive function" to create memorable mems.

However, since September 2022, mems have been completely removed from the site, despite overwhelmingly negative feedback from users as expressed in the official forum.

In 2026, the function of sharing mems has been reintroduced to the official Memrise courses.

=== Official courses ===
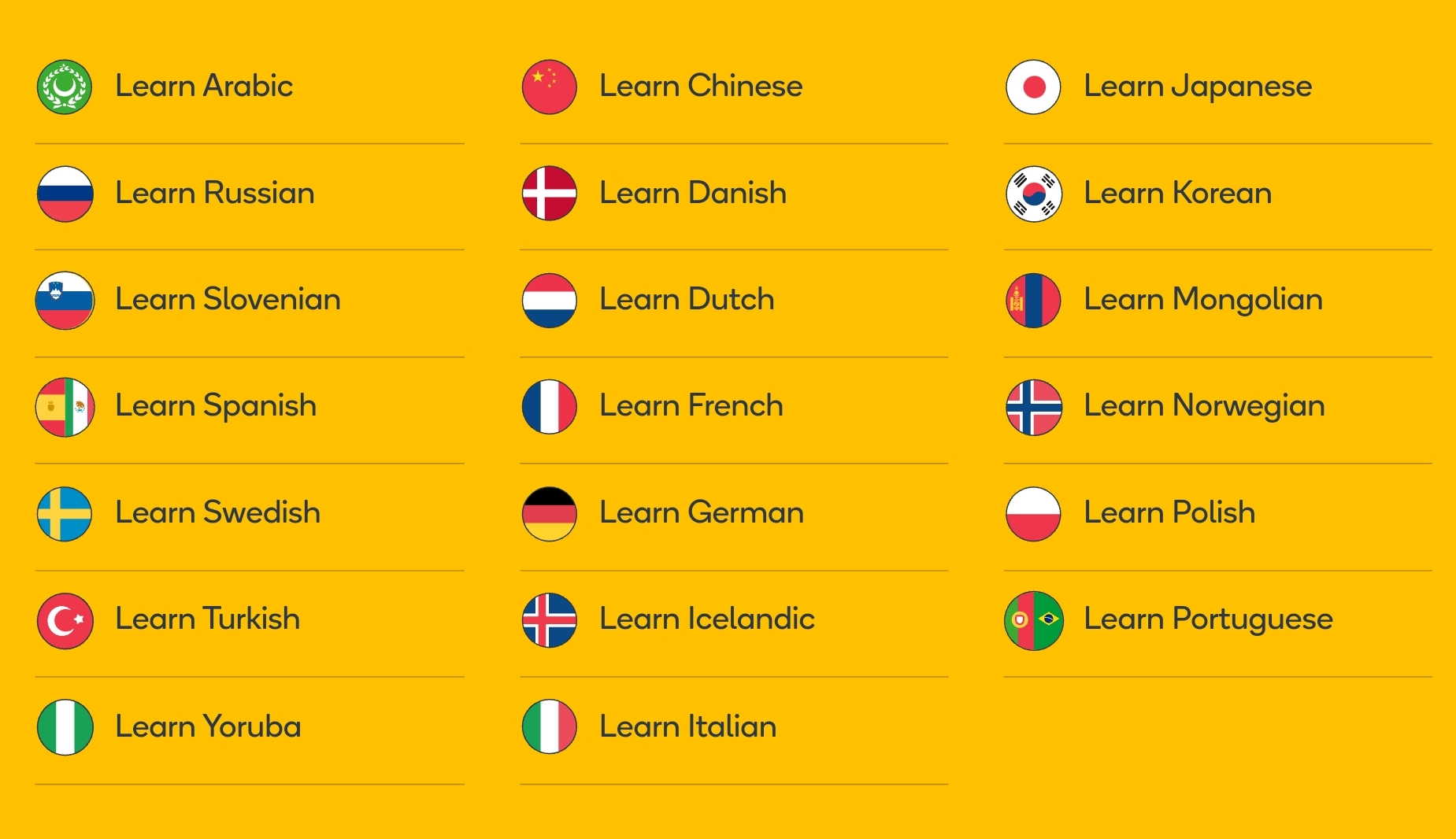
Languages supported by Memrise' official contents

Chatbot on the Memrise app for iPhone

As of February 2025, Memrise has official materials for 35 languages for English speakers. (Note: These languages are: Arabic, Chinese, Danish, Dutch, French, Galician, German, Greek, Hausa, Hebrew, Hindi, Icelandic, Igbo, Indonesian, Italian, Korean, Japanese, Mongolian, Norwegian, Persian, Polish, Portuguese (European and Brazilian varieties), Russian, Slovenian, Somali, Spanish (Castilian and Mexican varieties), Swahili, Swedish, Thai, Turkish, Ukrainian, Vietnamese, Welsh, Xhosa, and Yoruba.) Materials have also been developed for speakers of Arabic, (Note: Available languages: English (British and American varieties), French, German, Korean, Spanish, Swedish, Turkish.) Chinese, (Note: Available languages: English (British and American varieties), French, German, Japanese, Korean, Russian, Spanish.) Dutch, (Note: Available languages: English (British variety), French, Italian, Japanese, Korean, Spanish.) French, (Note: Available languages: English (British and American varieties), Chinese, German, Japanese, Korean, Russian, Slovenian, Spanish.) German, Hindi, Indonesian, Italian, Japanese, Korean, Norwegian, Polish, Portuguese, Russian, Spanish, Swedish, Turkish, and Vietnamese.

Starting from 2023, the official courses are combined with a GPT-3-powered "AI Language partner" that allows learners to practice human-like conversations, which Memrise believes can help learners to overcome the "confidence gap" in language acquisition. Official courses do not cover the vast majority of languages included in community courses, nor are there any non-language-related official materials.

=== Gamification elements ===
In late September 2012, the leaderboard on the website was temporarily suspended due to "extensive cheating". Specific users had been using bots and non-intensive mechanisms, such as celebrity photo memory courses, to achieve atypical scores that were not reflective of actual learning. In response, the administrators established a new leaderboard after revising the scoring loopholes.

== User-created content ==
Over time, Memrise, initially established as a learning platform centered around crowdsourcing and community engagement, has undergone a noticeable transition by gradually phasing out significant features in favor of prioritizing their official content offerings.

In late February 2019, Memrise announced that user-created content will be moving to a different web-based platform. It was announced that this new website would not have an app and that users would be unable to access their material offline. On 25 February 2020, as a response to the loud criticism from users, Memrise decided to undo the split, closing Decks and merging its content back to the Memrise main site.

However, in November 2023, Memrise announced on a forum post that it planned to "sunset" user-created courses. The forum was closed on 8 December 2023 as the company shifted its focus from supporting community-created content to developing a new "experience" based on official content. In February 2024, Memrise separated community courses to a new website, which is not accessible through the updated mobile app, meaning that users can no longer download the courses for offline accessibility. The official notice stated that the courses would remain on the new website until "at least the end of 2024".

As of October 2025, community courses are still available on the website.

== See also ==
- Anki
- Babbel
- Computer-assisted language learning
- Fluenz (software)
- Lang-8
- Language education
- Language pedagogy
- List of flashcard software
- List of language self-study programs
- Rosetta Stone
