= Livemocha =

Defunct online language learning community

- Website type: Social network service
- Available in: American English, Arabic, Bulgarian, Catalan, Croatian, Czech, Dutch, Esperanto, Estonian, Persian, Finnish, French, German, Greek, Hebrew, Hindi, Hungarian, Icelandic, Indonesian, Italian, Japanese, Korean, Latvian, Lithuanian, Mandarin Chinese, Norwegian (Bokmål), Polish, Portuguese (Brazil), Portuguese (Portugal), Romanian, Russian, Serbian, Slovak, Spanish, Swedish, Turkish, Ukrainian, and Urdu
- Owners: Livemocha, inc.
- Creators: Shirish Nadkarni, Co-Founder; Krishnan Seshadrinathan, Co-Founder; Michael Schutzler, Current CEO
- Revenue: undisclosed
- Website: http://livemocha.com
- Commercial: Yes
- Registration: Required for some services
- Launched: 24 Sep 2007
- Current status: inactive

Livemocha was an online language learning community based in Seattle, Washington. It provided instructional materials in 38 languages and a platform for speakers to interact with and help each other learn new languages. According to the site, it had approximately 12 million registered members from 196 countries around the globe. It was free to join and use; however, it offered the option to pay for various benefits. In 2012, 400,000 users visited the site daily.

== History ==
The company was founded in 2007 by Raghav Kher, Shirish Nadkarni and Krishnan Seshadrinathan. They conceived the idea for a web-based approach which utilized the power of social networking sites for language learning, with an emphasis on active participation and exchange in order to hone practical skills and conversational fluency. The name "Livemocha" was coined by the founders during a brainstorming session at a local café, and was meant to evoke the relaxed atmosphere of a coffee shop. On June 8, 2010, Michael Schutzler was announced as the new CEO.

The site received attention from trade publications and national and international newspapers, including the New York Times and the Financial Times. Time magazine named Livemocha one of its 50 Best Websites in 2010.

On April 2, 2013, Rosetta Stone announced that it had acquired Livemocha. Shortly afterwards, the Livemocha website required users' computers to have proprietary operating system Windows or Mac OS, blocking access from free software operating systems. On January 8, 2014, Livemocha closed access to its legacy website.

In 2016, Livemocha's website posted an announcement saying:

Unfortunately, the Livemocha community will close permanently on Friday, April 22, 2016, and you will no longer be able to access your account after that date.

== Basic courses ==
Livemocha supported 38 languages: English, Arabic, Bulgarian, Catalan, Croatian, Czech, Dutch, Estonian, Persian, Finnish, French, German, Greek, Hebrew, Hindi, Hungarian, Icelandic, Indonesian, Italian, Japanese, Korean, Latvian, Lithuanian, Mandarin Chinese, Norwegian (Bokmål), Polish, Portuguese (Brazil), Portuguese (Portugal), Romanian, Russian, Serbian, Slovak, Spanish, Swedish, Turkish, Ukrainian, Urdu, and Esperanto, which was the most recent addition.

The site could be viewed in 12 different languages: English, French, German, Italian, Japanese, Korean, Mandarin Chinese, Polish, Portuguese, Russian, Spanish, and Turkish.

Free basic courses were offered in all the above languages, consisting of roughly 30–50 hours of coursework. Several languages, like Lithuanian and Brazilian Portuguese, were first added to Livemocha through the process of "Member Translation": members fluent in two or more languages could translate already available course materials into their native tongue and publish the results on the site, with other users rating and improving the translations.

== Active courses ==
More advanced courses—called "Active Courses"—were available in five languages: English, French, German, Italian and Spanish. These courses required a monthly or annual fee and were intended to achieve conversational fluency. Instead of signing up for one particular course, users could opt to purchase the "Gold Key" which granted unlimited access to premium or paid content. The active courses proceeded through four levels of proficiency, and included reading, writing, speaking, and listening exercises.

== Peer feedback ==
Each reviewer earned 20 tokens for reviewing a user's submission. The reviewer could earn an extra 10 tokens for the first review of the passage or conversation. The writing was rated using three criteria: spelling, proficiency, and grammar. The speaking was rated using two criteria: pronunciation and proficiency. Each submission from a basic course for peer review cost 120 tokens.

== Member reviews ==
Completed exercises from both basic and active courses could be sent out for review by other members (native or fluent speakers), who provided feedback and tips. Members could also pay for "Expert Reviews" from language teachers that had been certified by Livemocha for 120 tokens. The user could rate the quality of these reviews, and choose to work with a particular expert reviewer. Private instruction sessions, conducted via video chat with a selected tutor, were also available for purchase.

Members earned "Mochapoints" by completing exercises and reviewing other people's submissions. These points are not to be confused with the tokens. The tokens were earned for rating other people's submissions, or from paying a set fee in real life currency for a certain number of tokens. Mochapoints were a way to keep track of one's progress and to compare the amount of time a user has put into the website compared to others. A user gained Mochapoints for entering submissions, grading other people's submissions, chatting with other users, etc. They could not be spent for content access in the same way that the tokens could be.

== Language learning and social networks ==
Livemocha called itself the largest language learning community in the world. In many ways it operated like a social networking site, and the basic ethos of the system was peer-to-peer: registered members could engage in synchronous and asynchronous communication, make a personal profile, connect with a circle of friends, upload content (there was a page dedicated to cultural exchange), contribute translations and help expand the base of available languages, and review other members’ work, such as recorded dialogues from lessons. It was referred to as "the Facebook of foreign languages," and its potential impact on conventional language teaching compared to that of Wikipedia on the traditional encyclopedia. One reviewer of the site observed, "With its unparalleled ability to connect people throughout the world, [the Internet] is changing the way that many people learn languages. There is still no way to avoid the hard slog through vocabulary lists and grammar rules, but the books, tapes and even CDs of yesteryear are being replaced by e-mail, video chats and social networks."

== Partnership in Brazil ==
In September 2011, Livemocha announced a partnership with the Brazilian education company Abril Educação, part of the media conglomerate Grupo Abril, which purchased a 5.9% stake in the company. Abril Educação promoted Livemocha to consumers and organizations throughout Brazil, with the aim of catering to the rising demand for language education and helping the country prepare to host the 2014 World Cup and the 2016 Olympics. In January 2011, Livemocha announced an agreement with Telefônica Brasil to offer its Internet customers discounted pricing on Livemocha's English courses.

== Public libraries ==
Access to Livemocha's courses was available for free through a number of public libraries in the US that subscribe to the site, including the Seattle Public Library.

== Finance ==
Livemocha was a privately held company. In 2011, it raised 5 million dollars in venture capital. In previous years it raised 14 million dollars from investors August Capital and Maveron.

== See also ==
- Babbel
- Busuu
- Lang-8
- Community language learning
- Language education
