= Auto-text =

Writing software

Auto-text is a portion of a text preexisting in the computer memory, available as a supplement to newly composed documents, and suggested to the document author by software. A block of auto-text can contain a few letters, words, sentences or paragraphs. It can be chosen by the document author via menu or be offered automatically after typing specific words or letters (word prediction or text prediction), or be added to the document automatically after typing specific words or letters (word / text completion).

Auto-text saves the time of typists who type many similar documents, or serves as an assistive technology for aiding persons with disabilities. These disabilities may be upper-limb disabilities that slow down movement, or produce pain or fatigue, as well as spelling disorders (e.g. dysgraphia). Persons with speech disabilities who type on augmentative and alternative communication devices may also benefit from Auto-text, since it can speed up their communication.

Examples of software that offer auto-text:

- Microsoft Word
- Kurzweil 3000
