= Fluenz =

Fluenz may refer to:

- Fluenz (software), language learning software
- Fluenz (drug), the brand name for live attenuated influenza vaccine (LAIV)
