= Christine Navarro Paul =

Native American basket maker from Louisiana

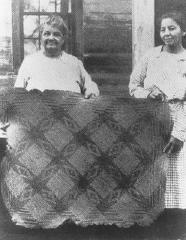
- Christine Navarro Paul (left) in 1908 displaying a woven cane mat outside her house
- Born: December 28, 1874; Charenton, Louisiana, U.S.
- Died: 1946 (aged 71–72)
- Occupation: Chitimacha basket maker
- Spouse: Benjamin Paul
- Parent(s): Joseph Auguste Navarro and Augustine Marguerite Pladner

Christine Navarro Paul (December 28, 1874 – 1946), a member of the Native American Chitimacha Tribe of Louisiana, was a celebrated basket maker and teacher.

Beginning in her 20s, she led the efforts of the Chitimacha women to create and sell beautiful woven baskets made from dyed wild river cane. Through this work they were able to support the tribe both financially and politically. Christine Navarro Paul collaborated with several European American women, who acted as intermediaries for the marketing and sale of the baskets. The friendships that she developed with these women helped her to gain additional support for the Chitimacha tribe.

She and her husband, Benjamin Paul, Chief of the Chitimacha, took care of orphans and other children in need in their community. Christine advocated for the establishment of a school within the community for Chitimacha children. In 1935, when the school was finally established, she became the lead teacher of basket weaving, which helped to ensure that the skills and artistry needed to continue to create Chitimacha baskets would not die out. Christine Navarro Paul died in 1946.

== Early life ==
Older Chitimacha women taught younger women to weave baskets from wild river cane, Arundinaria gigantea, to supplement their income. In addition they harvested food from gardens and gathered wild plants. Christine's mother died when she was seven years old and her father died when she was nine. She likely lived with her step-mother and was a student at the nearby Catholic school. There she would have learned English, a valuable skill which later enabled her to become the communication link with the white women she collaborated with to sell the Chitimacha baskets.

== Later life ==
Christine married Benjamin Paul, son of John Paul, chief of the Chitimacha. Like other men in the Chitimacha tribe, he would have done seasonal work on the sugarcane plantations, logged cypress trees, as well as hunted and fished for food. At his father's death Benjamin Paul became the chief of the Chitimacha tribe. Christine and Benjamin did not have any children of their own, however they did care for orphans and other needy children in their community. Sara McIlhenny, one of Christine's collaborators wrote of her, "The needy, sick and orphans all turn for help to the Chief and his wife..." Christine continued in her role as communicator and mediator for the Chitimacha people throughout her life. Her husband said of her to the Assistant Commissioner of Indian Affairs, that it was his wife that "is the one doing the Indian's business."

Anthropologist Mark R. Harrington interviewed Christine Paul in 1908.

Her granddaughter, Ada Thomas was also a notable basketmaker.

== Basket making ==
Indigenous peoples of the Southeastern Woodlands are known for crafting baskets and mats from rivercane. Chitimacha in particular are known for their complex and curvilinear designs in their rivercane baskets. The baskets, as cultural objects, also helped to establish the Chitimacha tribe as a unique Native American nation.

Christine likely learned her skill at weaving baskets from Miss Clara Darden, one of the older women in the tribe who was a skilled weaver. The baskets were made by collecting wild river cane, (Arundinaria gigant), which had once been plentiful, but had become increasingly difficult to find. They cut the cane and then while it was still green, split and peeled it into narrow splints to be dried and then dyed with natural dyes of yellow, black or red. It took weeks to prepare the splints before weaving could begin. The baskets were woven in one of 16 or more different patterns, with basket shapes that included mats, trays, bowls, and boxes with lids. A reporter from the New Orleans Daily Picayune observed a large trunk basket and basketry cigar case which Christine Paul had made.

=== Marketing the baskets ===
Mary McIlhenny Bradford, a member of the upper-class McIlhenny family on Avery Island, wrote to Chief John Paul in 1899 to ask about purchasing Indian baskets. Three months later Christine Paul, his daughter-in-law, wrote back letting her know that the basket was on its way. A non-Native man offered Christine $35 for the basket, but she sold it to Bradford. The basket Mary Bradford received was a double-woven, large, lidded basket. It had taken two women weeks to produce it. At that time in the United States there was an increasing demand for authentic, well-made Indian crafts. Gradually Mary and her older sister Sara McIlhenny developed an extensive network of upper-class White women to help market these baskets. Purchasers included those who wanted them for personal use and others who wanted to add them to Indian art collections or museums. The McIlhenny sisters saw their role as helping to preserve a nearly extinct craft while also supporting people in trouble. The income from the sales of the baskets would have been essential for the struggling Chitimacha community. Christine, as a member of the chief's family and someone who could read and write English, became the liaison with the McIlhenny sisters and organized the fulfillment of the orders. Christine helped to organize the revival of basketmaking by women in the Chitimacha tribe and Mary McIlhenny Bradford helped with marketing. For example, she worked to get the baskets included in an exhibition in the St. Louis World's Fair in 1904. During the 1920s and 1930s the communication between Christine and the McIlhenny sisters gradually slowed down. However, in the 1930s Christine, along with her sister-in-law Pauline Paul, developed a relationship with another White woman, Caroline Coroneos Dorman, a writer and teacher, who helped them to continue marketing their baskets. She also had an anthropological interest in the Chitimacha and other Native American tribes. Dorman wrote an article, "The Last of the Cane Basket Makers," for Holland's, The Magazine of the South in 1931. The article helped to renew interest in both the Chitimacha baskets and their Native American culture.

== Collections ==
Her work is included in the collection of the U.S. Department of the Interior Museum. The Smithsonian's National Museum of the American Indian has two unfinished, double-weave basket made by her that reveals construction techniques, as well raw materials for basket making, and six finished baskets by her in different styles, from a sieve to a cow-nose basket. Her work is also included in private collections.

== Death ==
Christine Navarro Paul's husband, Chief Benjamin Paul died in 1934. She continued her work of supporting the tribe by weaving baskets and teaching younger generations to weave until her death in 1946.
