= Ada Thomas =

Chitimacha basket weaver from Louisiana (1924–1994)

- Thomas (Chitimacha) weaving double-woven rivercane baskets
- Born: Ada Vilcan; July 31, 1924; Chitimacha Reservation, St. Mary Parish, Louisiana, U.S.
- Died: September 6, 1992 (aged 68); Charenton, Louisiana, U.S.
- Other names: Ada Vilcan Thomas
- Occupation: weaver
- Years active: 1970–1992
- Known for: double-weave rivercane baskets

Ada Thomas (Chitimacha, July 31, 1924–September 6, 1992) was a rivercane basket weaver from Louisiana. She excelled in double-weave, split rivercane basketry.

The National Endowment for the Arts named her a National Heritage Fellow in 1983. Her baskets are in public collections, including those at the Birmingham Museum of Art, Metropolitan Museum of Art, and Museum of International Folk Art.

== Early life ==
Ada Vilcan was born on July 31, 1924, on the Chitimacha Reservation, near Charenton, Louisiana, to Jane Bernard and Henry Vilcan. She was the fourth child in the family, and her siblings were Alvin, Hollansworth, Esta/Esther, Raymond, and Janet. Through the eighth grade, Thomas attended the reservation elementary school, where she also learned the Chitimacha basket weaving techniques from elders Christine Navarro Paul and her sister-in-law Pauline. (Note: Many sources give the relationship of Thomas to Paul as that of granddaughter; however, census records indicate Paul had no biological children, as does Melanie Marcotte's biography of Chief Paul given in the Chitimacha Newsletter. She and Chief Benjamin raised tribal orphans, but Vilcan was not orphaned.) The baskets woven by Chitimacha women are unique in that the patterns on the inside and outside are different, as two separate baskets are woven and joined at the rim. Using split cane, known locally as piya, dyed with natural walnut, "la passiance" plant root and lime to produce the traditional black, red and yellow colors; the strips are woven to produce designs of traditional animals of the bayou. Alligators, blackbird's and cow's eyes, hearts, perch, snakes, and turtles are recurring motifs. The plain interior basket is woven first and once the rim is reached, the basket is turned and woven from the rim back to the bottom bringing in the colored design.

== Career ==
After graduating from the reservation school, Vilcan moved to New Orleans, where she worked in an aircraft plant dedicated to the war effort. Though schools were segregated and Native Americans were not allowed to attend black or white high schools, government policy allowed plant workers to attend night school. Working by day and attending school at night, Vilcan was able to earn her high school diploma. Upon completing her schooling, she traveled the country, working at various jobs in Washington, D. C., New York City and Miami, Florida. In Miami, she met and married a jeweler and former New York City port official, Charles Thomas, with whom she had three sons: Arthur, Charles Henry, and Raymond.

When her husband died, Thomas returned to the Chitimacha Reservation in 1970 to raise her young sons. While they attended school, she revived the basket- weaving craft she had learned as a child. The poverty which had plagued the tribe during the Great Depression when she left the area had been replaced by prosperity with the growth in the oil industry. While the growth helped her tribal people economically, it also led to abandonment of their traditional crafts. Determined to save their unique basket-weaving techniques, Thomas partnered with Stephen Richmond of the Indian Arts and Crafts Board to prepare a show held at Louisiana State University in Baton Rouge. Richmond helped her secure funds to teach others the techniques, though she had little success in the early days. In 1983, she was one of the artisans honored as a National Heritage Fellow by the National Endowment for the Arts.

Thomas taught basket-weaving techniques at schools in Charenton and attended many festivals, like the New Orleans Jazz and Heritage Festival and the Folklife Festival hosted by the Smithsonian, to both show her works and demonstrate the craft. In her later years, she produced works primarily for privately held collections and museums.

== Death and legacy ==
Thomas died on September 6, 1992, in Charenton. Examples of her weaving are housed in the permanent collections of the Birmingham Museum of Art, the Louisiana Folklife Program, the Metropolitan Museum of Art, the Museum of International Folk Art of Santa Fe, New Mexico and the collections of the Department of the Interior.
