= Astron (research center) =

Precision oncology research company

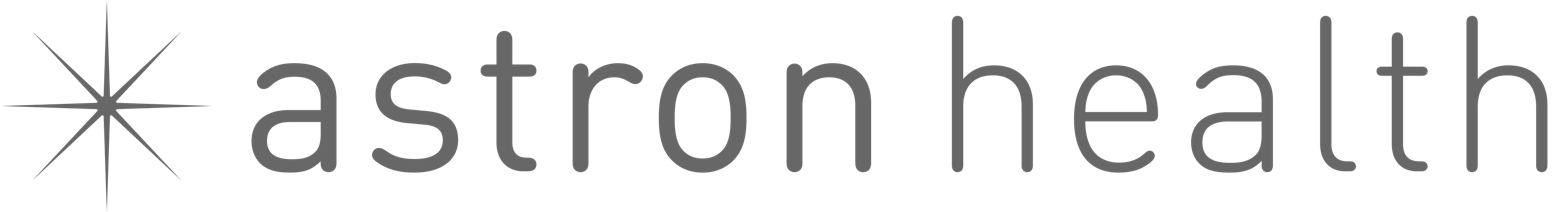
- Type: Private
- Industry: Biotechnology, Precision oncology
- Founded: c. 2024
- Headquarters: United Kingdom / United States
- Key people: Ben Whately (CEO); Dr. Padman Vamadevan (CMO); Myuran Balendran (CTO); Travis Christoffersen (Co-founder)
- Products: Polaris Research Report; Bioinformatics platform
- Website: astron.health

Astron is a precision oncology research company that develops bioinformatics platforms to support personalized cancer treatment. The company integrates genomic, transcriptomic, and proteomic data to improve treatment matching for cancer patients.

Astron applies artificial intelligence (AI) to analyze existing drug libraries and identify potential drug repurposing opportunities in oncology.

== Operations ==
Astron was founded in 2024 to guide targeted cancer therapies.

Astron's scientific advisory board includes academic oncologists and clinicians such as Dr. Shivan Sivakumar, associate professor of oncology at the University of Birmingham, and Dr. D. Barry Boyd, assistant professor of medicine (medical oncology) at Yale School of Medicine and author of The Cancer Recovery Plan. Ben Whately, co-founder of the language-learning platform Memrise, subsequently joined as CEO.

Astron's methodology is informed by published research highlighting limitations of genomic-only testing, including a 2020 study showing that some tumors harbor potentially deleterious DNA mutations that are not expressed at the RNA level, research demonstrating variable MAPK pathway activation in BRAF V600E–mutated melanoma despite identical genomic alterations and associated treatment resistance, and a 2022 study indicating that pathway-based molecular signatures may predict treatment response more accurately than mutation status alone.

== Technology ==
Astron's platform integrates genomic, transcriptomic, and proteomic data to support treatment decision-making in oncology.

The company also applies artificial intelligence to analyze published biomedical research in order to evaluate drug–target relationships and signaling pathways.

Astron provides personalized research reports to patients through their referring oncologists, and its work has been referenced in published case studies describing integrative oncology approaches.
