= Michael Schutzler =

American businessman

Michael Schutzler (born 1962) is the CEO of the Washington Technology Industry Association and former CEO of Livemocha, an online language learning community. He is also an author and business coach.

Schutzler's tertiary education began at Pennsylvania State University. There, he earned a Bachelor of Science, in Electrical Engineering.

Since 2000, he has been CEO and senior executive in several Internet industry firms and services including Classmates.com, Monster Worldwide and RealNetworks.

In 2007, Schutzler founded the business-coaching firm, CEOsherpa.com.

On 8 June 2010, Schutzler was announced as the new CEO of Livemocha.
