= Chester Higgins Jr. =

American photographer (born 1946)

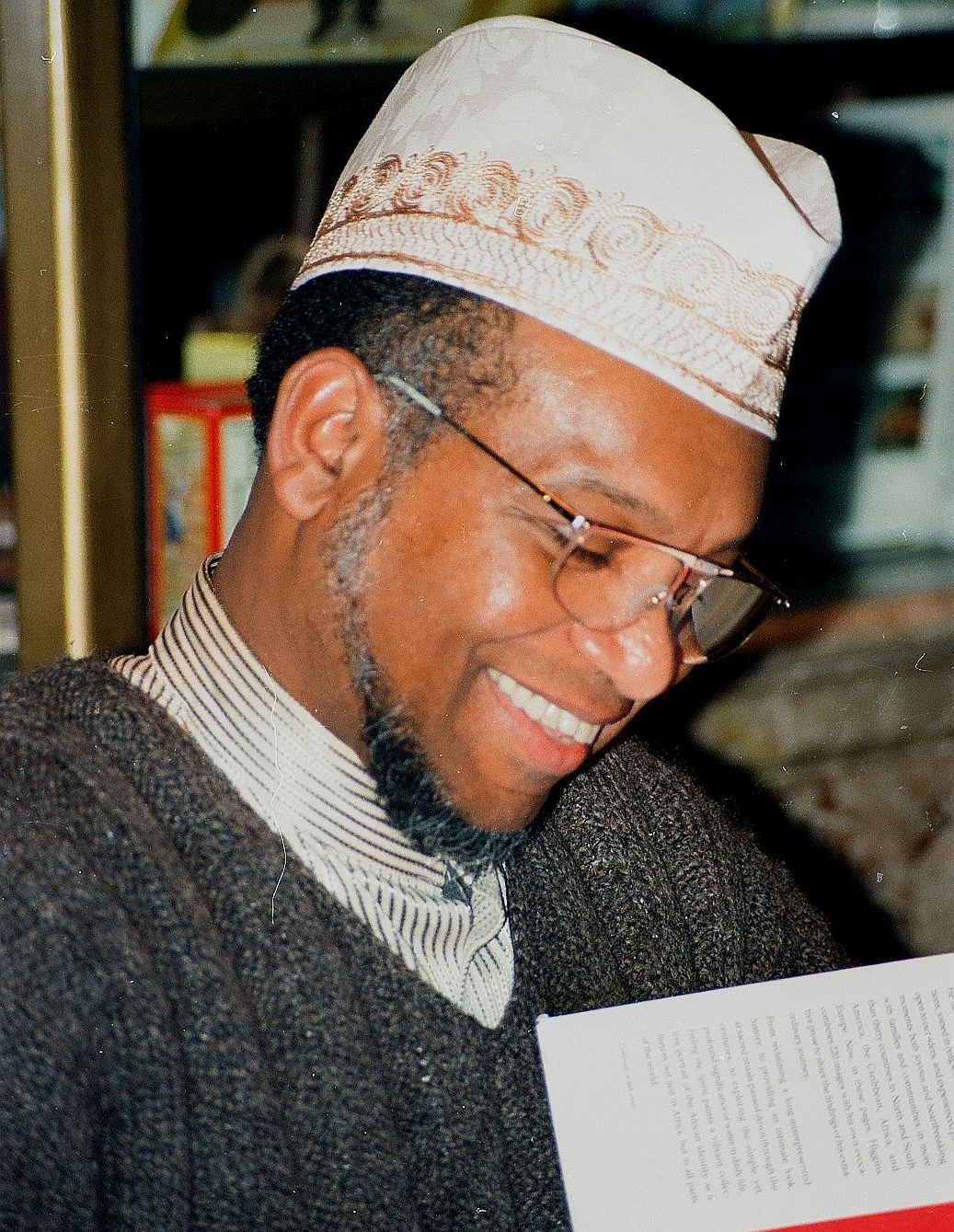
- Higgins in 1994
- Born: 1946 (age 79–80); Fairhope, Alabama, United States
- Education: Tuskegee Institute
- Known for: Photography
- Awards: International Photography Hall of Fame and Museum
- Website: www.chesterhiggins.com

Chester Higgins Jr. (born November 1946) is an American photographer, who was a staff photographer with The New York Times for more than four decades, and whose work has notably featured the life and culture of people of African descent. His photographs have over the years appeared in magazines including Look, Life, Time, Newsweek, Fortune, Ebony, Essence and Black Enterprise, and Higgins has also published several collections of his photography, among them Black Woman (1970), Feeling the Spirit: Searching the World for the People of Africa (1994), Elder Grace: The Nobility of Aging (2000), and Echo of the Spirit: A Photographer’s Journey (2004).

== Life and work ==
Higgins was born in Fairhope, Alabama, and grew up in New Brockton, Alabama. He attended Tuskegee Institute (now Tuskegee University), where he was mentored by the school's official photographer, P. H. Polk, and graduated in 1970 with a bachelor's degree in business management. Higgins worked as a photographer for The New York Times from 1975 and has exhibited in museums throughout the world.

Historian Lonnie Bunch has said of Higgins: "He elevated photography from documentary to fine art." Work by Higgins is included in the permanent collection of the Museum of Modern Art and National Gallery of Art and has been included in numerous book collections and appeared in publications such as Newsweek, Fortune, Look, Essence and Life.

Higgins has traveled to the African continent some 50 times since first going to Senegal in 1971, and according to Lonnie Bunch: "He's capturing an Africa that has a spirit of hope, of possibility that in some ways he believes will shape the African-American experience as well." An article about Higgins in the New York Amsterdam News observed: "In a world filled with negative visual depictions of people of color, what comes across in his decades of visual art is the love he has for Black people, a love he wishes they had for themselves as well." A 2023 interview for Zeke magazine, Daniela Cohen quoted him as saying: "Essentially, validation is what I've always done with my camera. I started out with a love for my immediate family. But it's been consistently a love for people who look like me and who experience the same experience."

In his 2022 book Sacred Nile, Higgins narrates the story of the African beginnings of spirituality, antecedents of the Biblical world along the River Nile from the 6,000-foot-high mountains of Kush (modern-day Ethiopia) through Nubia (Sudan) down to the ancient land of Kemet (Egypt).

Higgins is represented by Bruce Silverstein Gallery in New York City.

In 2022, Higgins was inducted into the International Photography Hall of Fame and Museum.

Higgins's work was included in the 2025 exhibition Photography and the Black Arts Movement, 1955–1985 at the National Gallery of Art.

== Selected exhibitions ==
- 1997: Feeling the Spirit, Anacostia Community Museum, Smithsonian Institution (January 20, 1997–March 23, 1997)
- 2015: Zéma, A Love Song, Skoto Gallery, New York (May 21–June 20, 2015)
- 2016-2017: Chester Higgins Jr.: Passing Through, Sugar Hill Children's Museum of Art & Storytelling (October 1, 2016–September 24, 2017)
- 2017-2018: Like a Study in Black History: P. H. Polk, Chester Higgins, and The Black Photographers Annual, Volume 2, Virginia Museum of Fine Arts (October 7, 2017–May 6, 2018)
- 2021: The Indelible Spirit, Bruce Silverstein Gallery (May 6–June 26, 2021)
- 2022: Chester Higgins: Signature of the Spirit, Shippensburg University (January 26–February 23, 2022)
- 2023: Chester Higgins Black Pantheon, Bruce Silverstein Gallery (September 14–October 28, 2023)
- 2024-2025: Flight into Egypt: Black Artists and Ancient Egypt, 1876–Now, Metropolitan Museum of Art (November 17, 2024–February 17, 2025) [group exhibition]
- 2025-2026: Photography and the Black Arts Movement, 1955–1985, National Gallery of Art (September 21, 2025–January 11, 2026); traveled to The J. Paul Getty Museum (February 24–June 14, 2026) and Mississippi Museum of Art, Jackson (July 25–November 8, 2026); exhibit was curated by, and the catalog edited by, Philip Brookman and Deborah Willis [group exhibition]
- 2026: Chester Higgins: Shared Memories, Bruce Silverstein Gallery (April 16–June 20, 2026)

== Published books ==
- With Machobane, Burns, Student Unrest at Tuskegee Institute: A Chronology, Behavioral Science Research Institute, Tuskegee University, Alabama, 1968. An academic community in conflict and its resolution.
- With McDougall, Harold, Black Woman, New York: McCalls Publishing, 1970. A portrait of the universality of women and the uniqueness of being black during the 1960s.
- With Coombs, Orde, Drums of Life, New York: Doubleday/Anchor Press, 1974. A portrait of the universality of men and the uniqueness of being black in the 1970s.
- With Coombs, Orde, Some Time Ago, New York: Doubleday/Anchor Press, 1980. A historical portrait of blacks in the United States between 1850 and 1950.
- Feeling The Spirit: Searching the World for the People of Africa, New York: Bantam Books, 1994. A portrait of the African Diaspora.
- With Betsy Kissam. Elder Grace: The Nobility of Aging, Boston: Bulfinch Press, November 2000.
- With Betsy Kissam. Echo of the Spirit: A Photographer’s Journey, New York: Doubleday, October 2004.
- With Fisher, Marjorie M; Peter Lacovara; Salima Ikram; Sue H. D'Auria. Ancient Nubia: African Kingdoms on the Nile. American University Press Cairo, October 2012.
- With Betsy Kissam, Sacred Nile, March Forth, 2021, ISBN 9780578851181.
