= Cambium Learning Group =

American technology company

- Type: Private
- Traded as: Nasdaq: ABCD
- Divisions: Learning A-Z; Lexia Learning; Voyager Sopris; Kurzweil; ExploreLearning; Cambium Assessment; Kurzweil Education; VKidz
- Website: cambiumlearning.com

Cambium Learning Group is an American education technology and services company that creates computer software and hardware products serving students ranging from pre-kindergarten to adult. Cambium Learning is a portfolio company of Veritas Capital, a New York-based private equity firm. It was established in 2003.

== History ==
The Dallas, Texas-based company was founded in 2003.

The company's business units are named Learning A-Z, Lexia Learning, Voyager Sopris, ExploreLearning, Cambium Assessment, Kurzweil Education, and VKidz.

After more than 18 years with the company, CEO John Campbell retired in May 2022, and was succeeded by Ashley Anderson Zantop.

== Acquisitions ==
Kurzweil Education (formerly Kurzweil Educational Systems) was bought in April 2005.

In December 2009, Cambium Learning and Voyager Sopris Learning (formerly Voyager Learning Company) merged under the newly formed company Cambium Learning Group, Inc.

The company purchased Class.com in 2011 for a reported $4.5 million cash.

VKidz Holdings, Inc. was acquired in December 2018.

Cambium Learning acquired the American Institutes for Research’s (AIR) K-12 assessment division in January 2020.

In September 2020, in an all-cash deal, Cambium bought Rosetta Stone with an equity valuation of approximately $792 million. The following year, in February 2021, the company sold its shares of Rosetta Stone to IXL Learning.

The company acquired Lexia in October 2020, and in 2021, Lexia was combined with Voyager Sopris to create Lexia Learning.

In 2021, Blackstone Group Inc. helped contribute to a $2.15 billion financing for Cambium Learning Group.
