= K-NFB Reader =

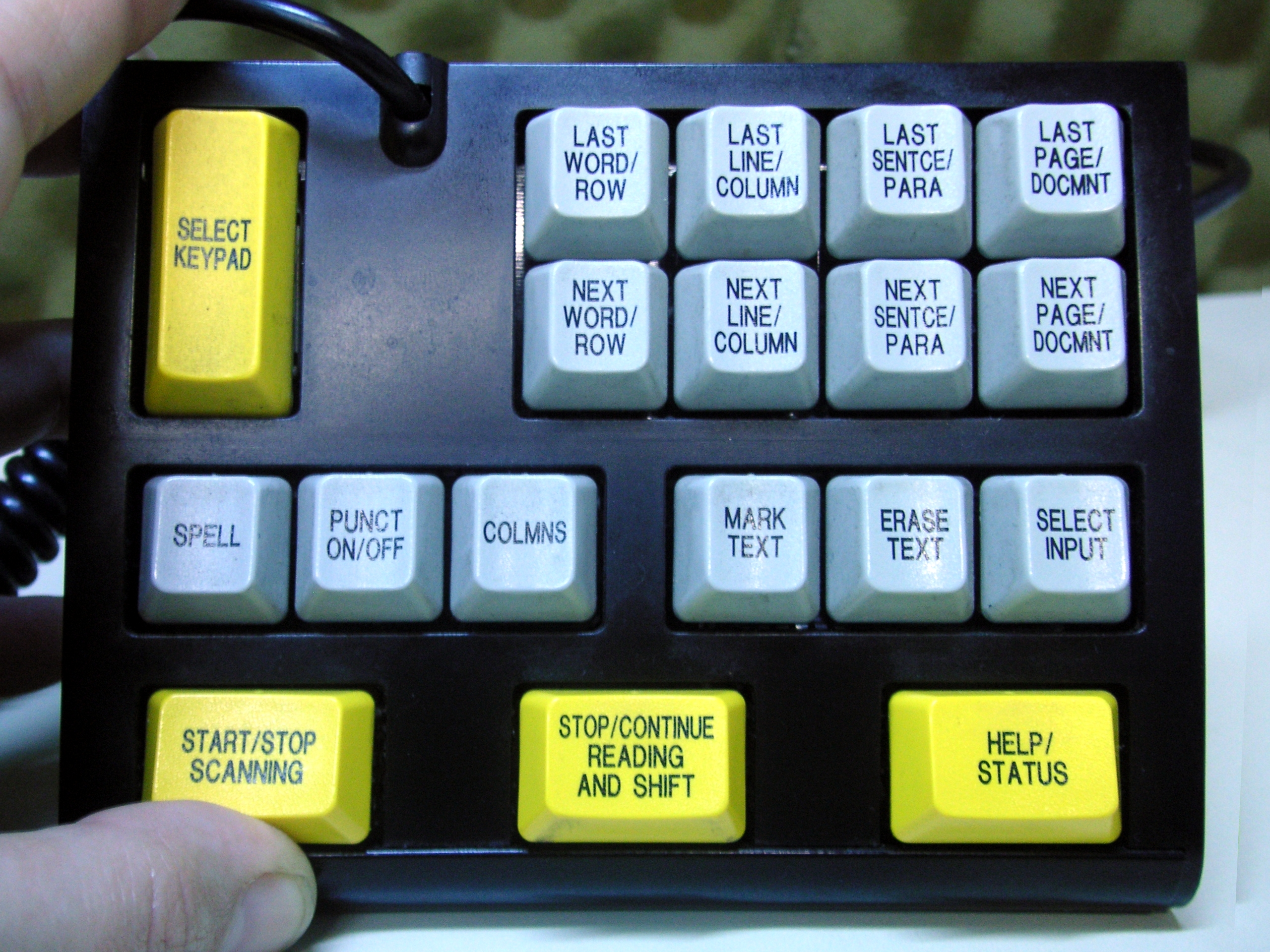
Keypad of The Reading Edge, a precursor of the K-NFB Reader

The K-NFB Reader (an acronym for Kurzweil — National Federation of the Blind Reader) is a handheld electronic reading device for the blind. It was developed in a partnership between Ray Kurzweil and the National Federation of the Blind.

The original version of the reader was composed of a digital camera and a PDA, which contained specialised OCR software and speech synthesizers to read the scanned material aloud. It was released at a price of $3,495.

The software was later ported to the Symbian operating system, to be used on Nokia N82 camera phones, with a new price of $1,595.

Developed by the National Federation of the Blind and Sensotec NV in 2014, an iOS port was released at a price of $99. An Android version was released shortly after.

KNFB Reader can read:

- Receipts
- Package labels and mail
- Product and nutritional information
- Print on your computer or tablet screen
- Longer documents such as books and user manuals
- Private documents such as tax materials, mortgage documents, bills, and medical reports
- Ebooks and documents in the ePub format
- Documents in more than thirty languages

== Innovative features ==
- Text Detection (shows you where there is print to capture)
- Tilt and Viewfinder Assist (ensures you capture the entire page)
- Text Highlighting (pinpoints text for dyslexic and other print-disabled users)

== See also ==
- Kurzweil Educational Systems
