= Orde M. Coombs =

American journalist

- Born: June 3, 1939; Saint Vincent, Caribbean Islands
- Died: September 1, 1984 (aged 45); New York City, New York, United States
- Education: Yale University (BA); New York University (MA)
- Occupations: Writer, editor

Orde Musgrave Coombs (June 3, 1939 – September 1, 1984) was an African-American writer and editor.

== Biography ==
Coombs was born on Saint Vincent in the Caribbean in 1939. He received his B.A. degree from Yale University in 1965, where he was the first Black student initiated into the secret society Skull and Bones. He earned his M.A. degree from New York University in 1971. He then worked as an editor for Doubleday & Company and later for McCall Corporation. In addition to editing, he produced documentaries on West Indian culture, and was an adjunct professor at New York University. He was a co-host for Black Conversations, a talk show on WPIX in 1975.

Coombs was featured on the cover of the November 20, 1972 issue of New York Magazine.

== Publications ==
- Do You See My Love for You Growing? (1972)
- Drums of Life (1974, with Chester Higgins Jr.)
- Sleep Late With Your Dreams (1977)
- Some Time Ago: A Historical Portrait of Black Americans from 1850–1950 (1980, with Chester Higgins Jr.).

== Editor ==
- We Speak as Liberators: Young Black Poets (1970)
- What We Must See: Young Black Storytellers (1971)
- Is Massa Day Dead? Black Moods in the Caribbean (1974)
