= ExploreLearning =

Canadian-American interactive learning company

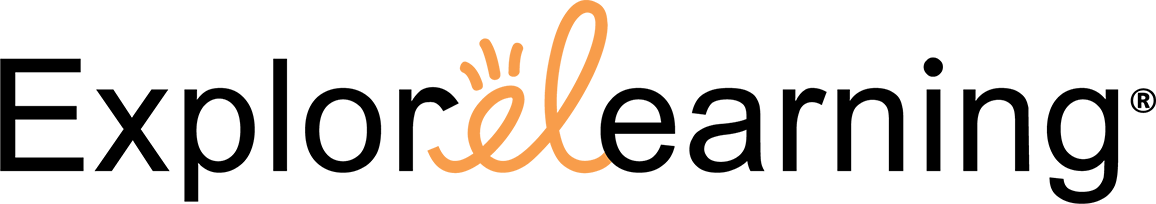
- Formation: 1999
- Headquarters: Toronto, Ontario , Canada
- President and Founder: David Shuster
- Parent organization: Cambium Learning Group
- Website: www.explorelearning.com

ExploreLearning is a Toronto, Ontario-based education technology company that operates a large library of interactive online simulations for mathematics and science education in grades 3–12 called 'Gizmos'. ExploreLearning also makes Reflex, an online, game-based system for math fact memorization. ExploreLearning is a business unit of Cambium Learning Group.

== History ==
The company was founded in 1999 by David Shuster.

In 2017, ExploreLearning acquired IS3D, LLC for an undisclosed amount.

In August 2025, Cambium Learning Group announced that it would merge its ExploreLearning and Learning A-Z brands, with a new unified name and brand identity to be introduced in early 2026. The consolidated platform is planned to offer supplemental curriculum and professional learning resources across K-12 literacy, mathematics, and science. As part of the merger, Learning A-Z president Aaron Ingold will assume leadership of the combined organisation, while David Shuster will transition into a senior advisory role.

== Products ==
=== Gizmos ===
"Gizmos" are a collection of online interactive simulations that are operated by ExploreLearning. The simulations are centered on science education and mathematics.

These simulations have been recognized with educational awards. The Gizmos earned finalist honors from the Software and Information Industry Association. They have been the subject of scholarly studies of educational technology.

=== Reflex ===
Reflex is for assessing and developing math fact fluency in grade 2-8 students.

=== Frax ===
Frax helps students master grade 3-5 fraction arithmetic.

=== Science4Us ===
Science4Us is designed for K-2 students, covering topics such as physical, life, and earth/space science.
