= Sonia Gil =

Venezuelan internet celebrity (born 1981)

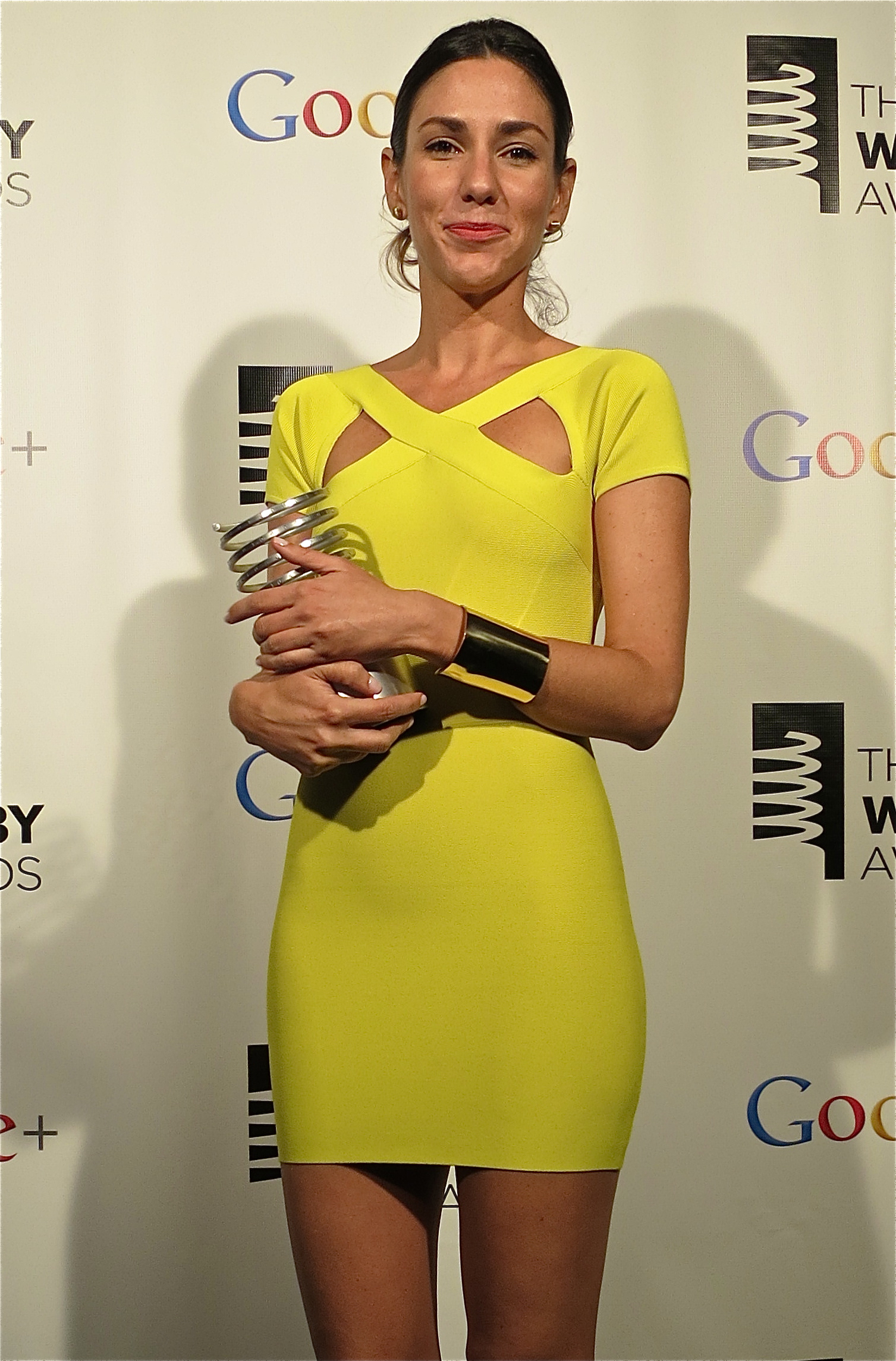
- Gil with her Webby award in 2012
- Born: September 24, 1981 (age 44); Venezuela
- Years active: 2005-present
- Known for: Language learning software, vlogging
- Website: www.soniagil.com

Sonia Gil (born 24 September 1981) is an entrepreneur and travel vlogger. She is the co-founder of the digital language learning platform Fluenz, where she leads the creation of all learning content. She is also the host and co-creator of Sonia's Travels, which airs weekly on YouTube and Yahoo Screen. She also stars in the Ulive travel series Almost Free. She is the winner of the 2012 People's Voice Webby Award for Best Web Personality, and the 2014 People's Voice Webby Award for Best "DIY-How to" online show for her How to Travel series.

== Early life and education ==
Sonia Gil was born in Venezuela, in a multilingual family. She grew up in Caracas and Boca Raton, Florida, and attended Cornell University, where she studied plant genetics.

== Career ==
During the first few years of college, Gil worked on an Internet start-up. The portal loquesea.com was online from 1997 to 2002, and was known as a very early social network for young people. The company "became the largest network of sites for youths in Latin America", and at some point had "19 sites running in 4 languages".

According to Joshua Cohen, Gil started the vlog Sonia's Travels after she began traveling extensively for her work with Fluenz, which "make the costs of producing Sonia's Travels marginal instead of prohibitive". She partnered with Mariana Hellmund, an award-winning filmmaker with an extensive career, and together they developed the visual style that characterizes the web series.

Another one of her projects, the non-profit Fluenz.org, distributes free English language programs for people in need.

Gil also has her own video series, Almost Free, on Scripps Network's Ulive.com.

In the spring of 2016, she became a co-founder and investor at Nuverz.
