= Paul Nussbaum =

American neuropsychologist

Paul David Nussbaum is an American clinical neuropsychologist and an adjunct associate professor in Neurological Surgery at the University of Pittsburgh School of Medicine.

He obtained his B.A. in Psychology in 1985 and his Master's degree in Clinical Psychology in 1987 at the University of Arizona. After completing his M.A., Nussbaum continued to the doctorate program and received his Ph.D in 1991. On the 45th Anniversary of University of Arizona, the university made Nussbaum an honorary alumnus of the class of 1991.

He was the co-founder of a company that launched Fit Brains in 2008.

== Publications ==
- Goldstein, Gerald; Nussbaum, Paul David; Beers, Sue R., eds. (1997). Neuropsychology. New York: Plenum Press. ISBN 978-0-306-45646-6.
- Nussbaum, Paul David, ed. (1997). Handbook of neuropsychology and aging. New York: Plenum Press. ISBN 978-0-306-45460-8.
- Snyder, Peter J.; Nussbaum, Paul D.; Robins, Diana L., eds. (2006). Clinical neuropsychology a pocket handbook for assessment (2nd ed.). Washington, DC: American Psychological Association. ISBN 978-1591472834.
- Nussbaum, Jon F.; Federowicz, Molly; Nussbaum, Paul D. (2010). Brain health and optimal engagement for older adults. Aresta. ISBN 978-8493744007.
- Daggett, Willard R.; Nussbaum, Paul D. (2008). What brain research teaches about rigor, relevance, and relationships : and what it teaches about keeping your own brain healthy. Rexford, New York: International Center for Leadership in Education. ISBN 978-0965655378.
