= Sarah Sense =

American Chitimacha/Choctaw visual artist from California

Sarah Sense (born 1980) is an American Chitimacha/Choctaw visual artist known for large scale weavings of photographs, maps, and cultural ephemera to create social and political statements. Sense employs traditional weaving techniques from her Chitimacha and Choctaw family to create two-dimensional photo weavings and three-dimensional photo baskets.

== Early life and education ==
Sense grew up in Sacramento, California. Her mother is half Chitimacha from Louisiana through her mother and half Choctaw from Oklahoma through her father. Her father is of German descent; her paternal grandfather was from Kiel. Her paternal grandmother was of English and Norwegian descent and grew up in Texas.

She has a BFA from California State University, Chico (2003) and an MFA from Parsons the New School for Design, New York (2005).

As a teenager and during her college years Sense spent her summers on the Chtimacha Reservation in Charenton, Louisiana. This is where she was introduced to the art of basket weaving. At age 18 the tribe's cultural department asked her to visit Southwest Museum of the American Indian in Los Angeles to research if the museum held Chitimacha baskets. This experience influenced the direction of her own creative work.

== Career ==
Upon completing her education Sense became the curator of the American Indian Community House Gallery (2005–07), where she cataloged the gallery's 30-year history. She has worked as an administrator, curator, project director, and educator at various art institutions, including the Hammer Museum at the University of California, Los Angeles, and the Institute of American Indian Arts in Santa Fe, New Mexico.

A significant aspect of Sense's art practice involves international travel to visit with, interview, and learn from indigenous people.

According to the National Women's History Museum her early works were inspired by a "British Library Visiting Fellowship and include map and landscape weavings focused on colonial impact on climate, with purpose to conceptually reinstate Indigenaity with traditional weaving patterns while decolonizing colonial maps."

Dr Max Carocci, curator at the British Museum says about Sense's work Weaving Water, “Drawing from an illustrious artistic tradition, the work that Sarah Sense created for this exhibition interrogates notions of identity and belonging through the metaphorical potential of weaving. Sarah Sense’s art elaborates these concepts through an emotive relationship with water, an element that simultaneously connects and separates.”

In 2022 the Bruce Silverstein Gallery stated, "Woven into Sense’s work are her two personas, the Cowgirl and the Indian Princess. These recurring figures in the artist’s work comment on American popular culture’s Native interpretations in film, decoration, fashion, and education since the late 19th century. Sense associates these personas with her duality of being raised by a Native mother and a non-Native father."

About Sense's 2024 solo exhibition, I Want to Hold You Longer, Bruce Silverstein wrote, "Featuring over twenty unique, hand-woven, sculptural photographs, I Want to Hold You Longer examines the intricate and often fraught history of Indigenous basket-making and collecting. This exhibition considers the traditional practices of Chitimacha and Choctaw weaving and their purposes, reflecting on their personal and collective histories. Using historical, colonial documents and maps interwoven with contemporary photographs of ancestral lands, Sense reflects on the connections between individual memory and collective heritage. I Want to Hold You Longer invites viewers to see each piece as a vessel, a conduit between personal and collective memory, carrying a genealogy, a history, and a profound desire for continuity and survival."

Sense has completed murals in Louisiana and in California.

Her work is in national and international collections including: Smithsonian Institution's National Museum of the America Indian; Amon Carter Museum; National Gallery of Canada; and Museo Nacional de Culturas Populares, Mexico City; the Chitimacha Tribal Museum, Eaton Corporation; and the Tweed Museum of Art at the University of Minnesota.

=== Significant exhibitions ===
- Sarah Sense, MTV/Viacom, New York, NY, 2005
- New Work by Sarah Sense, Blue Rain Gallery, Santa Fe, New Mexico, 2008
- Pieces of Home, Evergreen State College, Olympia, Washington, 2010
- Reimagining the West, Scottsdale Museum of Contemporary Art, Scottsdale, AZ, 2010
- In/SIGHT, Chelsea Art Museum, New York, 2010
- HIDE: Skin as Material and Metaphor, The National Museum of the American Indian, George Gustav Heye Center | New York, NY, 2010–2011
- First Continental Biennale of Contemporary Native Arts, Museo de Nacional Culturas Populares, Mexico City, 2012
- Weaving Water, Rainmaker Gallery, Bristol, England, 2013
- Grandmother’s Stories, AHHA, Tulsa, Oklahoma, 2015
- Remember, the World Cultures Museum, Frankfurt, Germany, 2016
- Indigenous/Settler, Princeton University, 2019
- Power Lines, Bruce Silverstein Gallery, New York, NY, 2022
- I Want to Hold You Longer, Bruce Silverstein Gallery, New York, NY, 2024

=== Commissions ===
- Listen to the Atlantic, It’s Speaking to You, National Marine Aquarium, Take A Part, Plymouth, England, 2019
- A Plan of Boston, Worcester Art Museum, Worcester, MA, 2023
- Mississippi Meshassepi, Florida State University, 2021
- Speaking with Light: Contemporary Indigenous Photography, Amon Carter Museum of Art, Fort Worth, Texas, 2022

=== Publications ===
Weaving the Americas: A Search for Native Art in the Western Hemisphere (Pascoe, 2012)
