= Bruce Silverstein Gallery =

Art gallery in Manhattan, New York

- Formation: 2001
- Type: Art Gallery
- Headquarters: 529 West 20th Street, 3rd floor
- Location: Manhattan, New York
- Coordinates: 40°44′57″N 74°0′19″W
- Members: Member of the Association of International Photography Art Dealers
- Founder: Bruce Silverstein
- Website: www.brucesilverstein.com
- Formerly called: Silverstein Photography

Bruce Silverstein Gallery is an art gallery in the Chelsea section of Manhattan, New York City. Founded in 2001 by Bruce Silverstein, the gallery represents contemporary and historically significant artists, emphasizing the exploration of both renowned and lesser-known works. The gallery is a member of the Association of International Photography Art Dealers.

== Exhibitions ==
The gallery has shown work by artists including Constantin Brâncuși, Marie Cosindas F. Holland Day, Todd Hido, Walter Iooss Jr., André Kertész, Nathan Lyons, Lisette Model, Barbara Morgan, Aaron Siskind, Keith A. Smith, Rosalind Solomon, Frederick Sommer, Trine Søndergaard, Zoe Strauss, and Michael Wolf.

In the early 2020's, the gallery showcased works by indigenous artists like Dakota Mace and Sarah Sense, emphasizing underrepresented perspectives in contemporary photography. It has also contributed to the recognition of Black photographers, presenting a posthumous exhibition in 2024 of Ray Francis, a founding member of the Kamoinge Workshop known for prioritizing education over producing work, and a retrospective in 2023 of Chester Higgins' five decades of documenting notable figures in Black diasporic culture. The latter was curated by Deborah Willis, a prominent scholar in African-American art and photography.

The gallery also participates in art fairs including the AIPAD Photography Show, Paris Photo, Art Basel Miami Beach and The Armory Show.
