= Ben Whately (entrepreneur) =

British entrepreneur and CEO

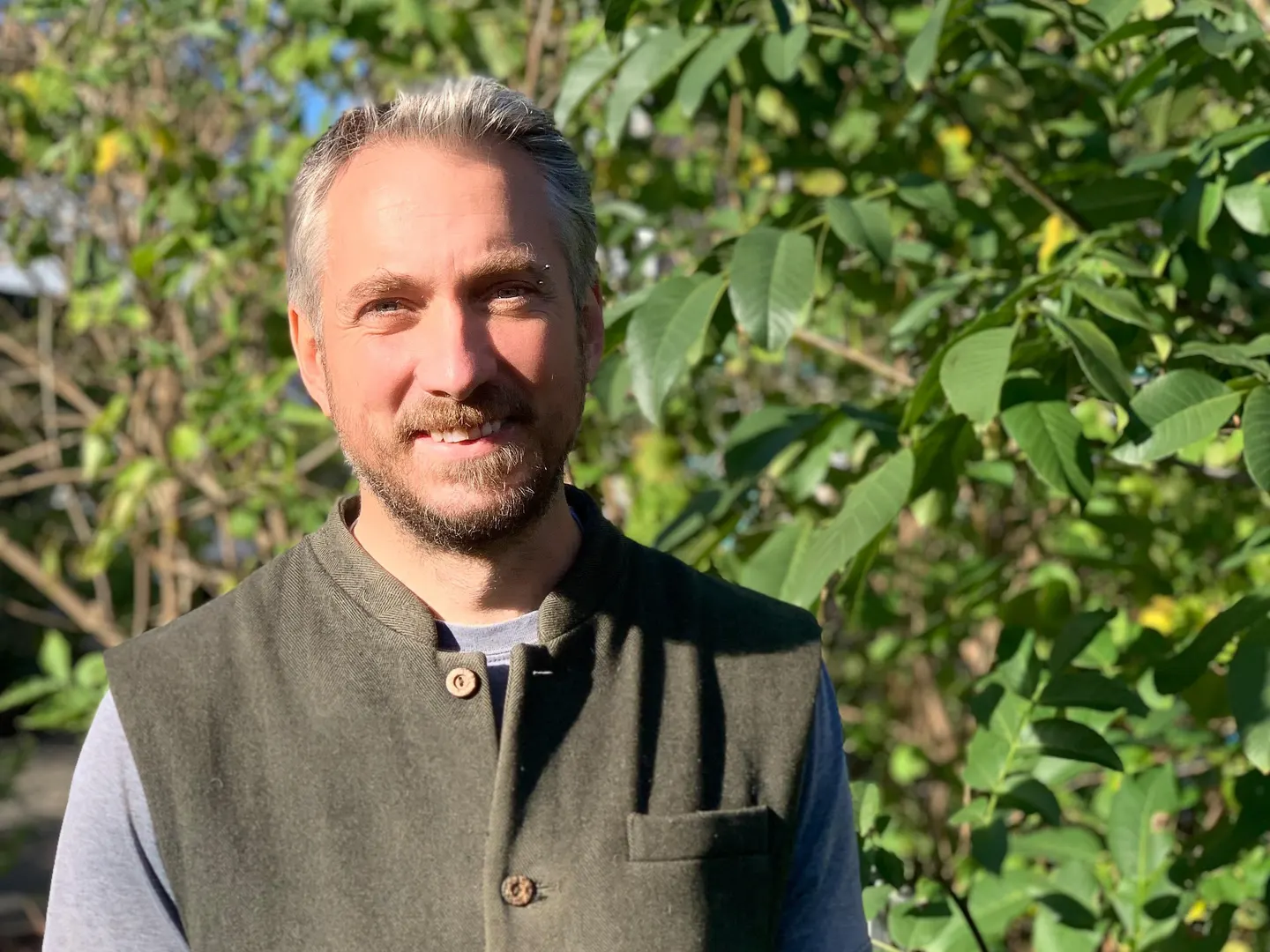
Ben Whately

Ben Whately is a British entrepreneur and CEO of Memrise, a language-learning platform, and Astron Health, a precision oncology company.

== Early life and education ==
From 2000 to 2003, Whately studied at the University of Oxford, where he earned a Master of Arts (MA) in Experimental Psychology. His research focused on neural networks and computational modeling of human learning. While at Oxford, Whately met his future Memrise co-founders, Ed Cooke and Greg Detre, during their studies in neuroscience and psychology.

== Career ==
In 2010, Whately co-founded Memrise alongside Ed Cooke and Greg Detre. The platform uses spaced repetition, mnemonic techniques, and artificial intelligence to help users learn languages more effectively. In 2013, he was the product innovation lead on Cat Academy.

Whately is also the author of Black Dragon River, a 2005 book about his experiences learning Chinese through immersion. In 2025, Ben Whately co-authored "The Memrise Prize, an International Research Competition: A Pragmatic Trial to Compare Methods for Learning Foreign Language Vocabulary", published in Scientific Data.

In 2024, Whately co-founded Astron Health, a bioinformatics company focused on precision oncology.

== Social activities ==
In 2022, Whately founded The Angry Teenagers, a climate action project that utilizes the Tezos blockchain to fund reforestation through the sale of dynamically updating NFTs.

As a venture partner at Carbon13 and a supporter of programs like Zinc Ventures, Whately assists entrepreneurs in developing commercially viable businesses focused on transitioning economic systems toward sustainability.
