= Chitimacha =

Indian tribe in Louisiana, United States

- The official Tribal Logo of the Chitimacha Tribe

Total population
- 1,300

Regions with significant populations
- United States (Louisiana)

Languages
- English, French, Cajun French, Isleño Spanish, (formerly) Chitimacha

Religion
- Catholicism, other

The Chitimacha (/ˈtʃɪtɪməʃɑː/ CHIT-i-mə-shah; or /tʃɪtɪˈmɑːʃə/ chit-i-MAH-shə) are an Indigenous people of the Southeastern Woodlands in Louisiana. They are a federally recognized tribe, the Chitimacha Tribe of Louisiana.

The Chitimacha have an Indian reservation in St. Mary Parish near Charenton on Bayou Teche. Their reservation is a small part of their precontact territory. They are the only Louisiana tribe who still control some of their original land, where they have long occupied areas of the Atchafalaya Basin, "one of the richest inland estuaries on the continent." In 2011 they numbered about 1100 people.

Historically, the Chitimacha spoke the Chitimacha language, a language isolate. The last two fluent speakers died in the 1930s, but the tribe has been working to revitalize the language since the 1990s. They use notes and recordings made by linguist Morris Swadesh around 1930. They have also started immersion classes for children and adults. In 2008 they partnered with Rosetta Stone in a two-year effort to develop software to support learning the language. Each tribal household was given a copy to support use of the language at home. The Chitimacha have used revenues from gambling to promote education and cultural preservation, founding a tribal museum and historic preservation office, and restoration of their language.

The Chitimacha are one of four federally recognized tribes in the state.

== Name ==
The name Chitimacha is believed to derive from a Chitimacha term meaning “people who live on the Grand river.” In the Chitimacha language, the people have also referred to themselves as “men all together red.” Another name, Yaknechitto, meaning “big country” was used for a group also referred to as the Chitimacha. The term may have instead referred to the Atakapa or to a geographic division of the Chitimacha.

== Historical lifeways ==
The Chitimacha established their villages in the many swamps, bayous, and rivers of the Atchafalaya Basin, "one of the richest inland estuaries on the continent." They knew this area intimately. The site conditions provided them with a natural defense against enemy attack and made these villages almost impregnable. As a result, they did not fortify them. The villages were rather large, with an average of about 500 inhabitants. Dwellings were constructed from available resources. Typically the people built walls from a framework of poles and plastered them with mud or palmetto leaves. The roofs were thatched.

The Chitimacha raised a variety of crops, and agricultural produce provided the mainstay of their diet. The women tended cultivation and the crops. They were skilled horticulturalists, raising numerous, distinct varieties of corn, beans, and squash. Corn was the main crop, supplemented by beans, squash and melons. The women also gathered wild foods and nuts. The men hunted for such game as deer, turkey and alligator. They also caught fish. The people stored grain crops in an elevated winter granary to supplement hunting and fishing.

Living by the waters, the Chitimacha made dugout canoes for transport. These vessels were constructed by carving out cypress logs. The largest could hold as many as 50 people. To gain the stones they needed for fashioning arrowheads and tools, the people traded crops for stone with tribes to the north. They also developed such weapons as the blow gun and cane dart. They adapted fish bones to use as arrowheads.

The Chitimacha were distinctive in their custom of flattening the foreheads of their male babies. They would bind them as infants to shape their skulls. Adult men would typically wear their hair long and loose. They were skilled practitioners of the art of tattooing, often covering their face, body, arms and legs with tattooed designs. Because of the hot and humid climate, the men generally wore only a breechcloth, and the women a short skirt.

Like many Native American peoples, the Chitimacha had a matrilineal kinship system, in which property and descent passed through the female lines. The hereditary male chiefs, who governed until early in the 20th century, came from the maternal lines and were approved by female elders. Children were considered to belong to their mother's family and clan and took their status from her. Like other Native American tribes, the Chitimacha at times absorbed and acculturated other peoples. In addition, as Chitimacha women had relationships with European traders in the decades of more interaction, their mixed-race children were considered to belong to the mother's family and were acculturated as Chitimacha.

The Chitimacha were divided into a strict class system of nobles and commoners. They had such a distinction that the two classes spoke different dialects. Intermarriage between the classes was forbidden.

== History ==
=== Precontact ===
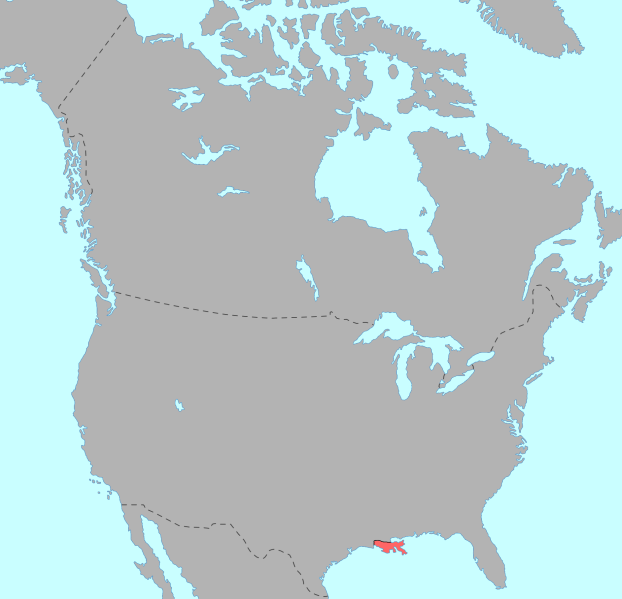
The Chitimacha's ancestral territory

The Chitimacha Indians and their ancestors inhabited the Mississippi River Delta area of south central Louisiana for thousands of years before European encounter. Their oral history states that their territory was marked by four prominent trees. Archaeological evidences suggest that the Chitimacha and their ancestors have lived in Louisiana for perhaps 6,000 years. Prior to that, they may have migrated into the area from west of the Mississippi River.

=== Colonial period to 20th century ===
At the time of Columbus’ arrival in America, historians estimate the combined strength of the four Chitimacha groups was about 20,000. Although the Chitimacha had virtually no direct contact with Europeans for two more centuries, they suffered Eurasian infectious diseases contracted from other Natives who had traded with them, such as measles, smallpox, and typhoid fever. Like other Native Americans, the Chitimacha had no immunity to these new diseases and suffered high fatalities in epidemics.

In 1650, the Chitimacha were estimated to have a population of around 4,000. In 1699, the Washa, Chawasha, and Okelousa were estimated to have a combined population of around 700.

The Chitimacha fought a long war against the French. Infectious diseases such as measles and smallpox devastated the Chitimacha population and they were driven from their villages in Bayou Lafourche. Many survivors were subsequently sold into slavery by the French.

The Chawasha participated in a French expedition against the Chitimacha in 1707, in 1730, French authorities in New Orleans ordered a massacre of the Chawasha with the aim of destroying the tribe. Following the massacre, some Chawasha are believed to have merged with the Chitimacha.

The Chitimacha absorbed remaining Taensa and some Houma, while some Chitimacha were absorbed into the mixed group known as the Houma.

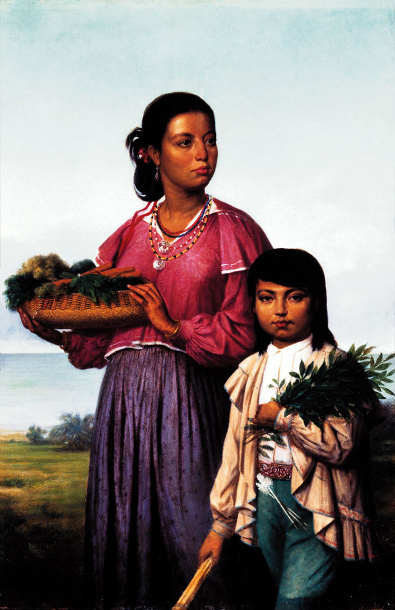
"Two Chitimacha Indians", painting by François Bernard, 1870

In the late 18th century, the British deported the Acadians (French colonists in Acadia) from eastern Canada after defeating France in the Seven Years' War and taking over their territories in North America east of the Mississippi River. Some Acadian refugees were resettled in Louisiana along the Mississippi River; their descendants became known as Cajuns. They also put pressure on the Chitimacha population because they took over their land.

Eventually some Chitimacha married Acadians and gradually became acculturated to their community, including converting to Catholicism. Others absorbed Europeans into Chitimacha society. Mixed-race children born to Chitimacha women were considered to belong to their mother's families and generally were raised within the Indigenous culture.

The Chitimacha in the mid-19th century sued the United States for confirmation of title to their tribal land. The federal government issued a decree establishing an area of 1,062 acres in St. Mary Parish as Chitimacha land.

=== 20th century ===
The 1900 federal census recorded six Chitimacha families with a total of 55 people, three of whom were classified as full-bloods. In 1910 there were 69 Chitimacha recorded; 19 of their children were students at the Carlisle Indian School in Pennsylvania, where they boarded full time along with other Native American students from a wide variety of tribes. The Indian boarding schools were considered a means to assimilate the children into mainstream United States culture. They disrupted transmission of native languages by forcing the children to use English at school and taking them away from their families for lengthy periods of time.

In December of 1901, a fight broke out among several Chitimacha youths in Charenton. Tribal member Jules Darden brought them home before returning to the town, where deputy sheriff Alfred Pecot confronted him about the incident. Darden denied involvement and resisted arrest, after which he was badly beaten by a crowd. Delphine Stouff, who feared Picot might shoot her, pulled Darden away from the crowd.

Chitimacha family with baskets and mortar, left to right: Delphine Darden Stouff, Constance Marie Stouff, Clara Darden, and Octave Stouff Sr.

The following day, Pecot and two other men went to Chief John Paul's home to arrest his son Oliver. Although Oliver denied involvement in the fight, he was shot and killed when he attempted to flee. His uncle William Paul was also shot and killed after confronting Pecot. The men then turned on John Paul, beating him with their guns. When his pregnant daughter Virginia Darden intervened, she was shot in the head. Jules Darden, injured in the previous night’s attack, arrived after hearing his wife scream and fired at the posse, forcing them to retreat. Virginia survived the shooting but died within a year.

Newspapers sensationalized the incident as an “Indian uprising” claiming that the Chitimacha had carried out a series of attacks and emphasizing injuries sustained by the posse during the incident.

Jules Darden was later stabbed to death by whites in 1908. One of the perpetrators, George Veeder, was elected to the Louisiana House of Representatives only months after the killing. When Anthropologist Mark Harrington attempted to bring the 1901 and 1908 murders to the attention of the Office of Indian Affairs, the acting commissioner told him that the office had no jurisdiction over the Chitimacha and directed him to raise the matter with the governor of Louisiana.

The tribe was under economic pressure in the early 20th century, and sometimes members were forced to sell land because they could not afford taxes. Sarah Avery Mcllhenny, a local benefactor whose family owned and operated the factory to manufacture Tabasco, responded to a call for aid by Chitimacha women. She purchased their last 260 acres of land at a sheriff's sale in 1915; then transferred it to the tribe. They ceded the land to the federal government (Department of Interior) to be held in trust as a reservation for the tribe. McIlhenny also encouraged Federal recognition of the Chitimacha as a tribe,

while advocating for the federal recognition of the Chitimacha, Sara Mcllhenny told Charles Dagenett, the supervisor of Indian Employment in the Office of Indian affairs, that Chitimacha children could not attend white schools because they were not considered white but refused to attend African American schools as they considered themselves superior to African Americans. She stated that she had sent 20 children to Carlisle Indian Industrial school, but questioned whether it had been the right decision, as many of the children had died there or soon after returning, while many of those who returned were unhappy with the experience.

Location of the Chitimacha Reservation in Louisiana

An attorney named Emmet Alpha who had previously made claims against the tribe, also advocated for assistance to improve the Chitimacha’s condition from the Indian Rights Association. Although he disparagingly characterized the Chitimacha as being only distantly of Native ancestry, heavily intermarried with African Americans, and indebted because they did not consider themselves subject to US law.

the Department of Interior granted the tribe federal recognition in 1916.

The Chitimacha were the first Native American tribe in Louisiana to gain federal recognition. Most Native Americans of the Southeast had been forcibly removed to Indian Territory or Texas west of the Mississippi River during the 1830s. The tribe received some annuities and financial benefits as a result of formal recognition. But the population continued its decline and by 1930, the Chitimacha had a recorded total of 51 people.

Between 1903 and 1918, Chitimacha with African ancestry were removed from the reservation and disenrolled, following that marriage between African Americans and Chitimacha was forbidden by the tribe, these rules did not apply to marriages with white Louisianans. Chitimacha enrollment is based off the 1926 and 1959 rolls which black Chitimacha were not part of, as a result despite the tribe not contesting that the black descendants of Chitimacha have Chitimacha ancestry, they are not allowed to enroll.

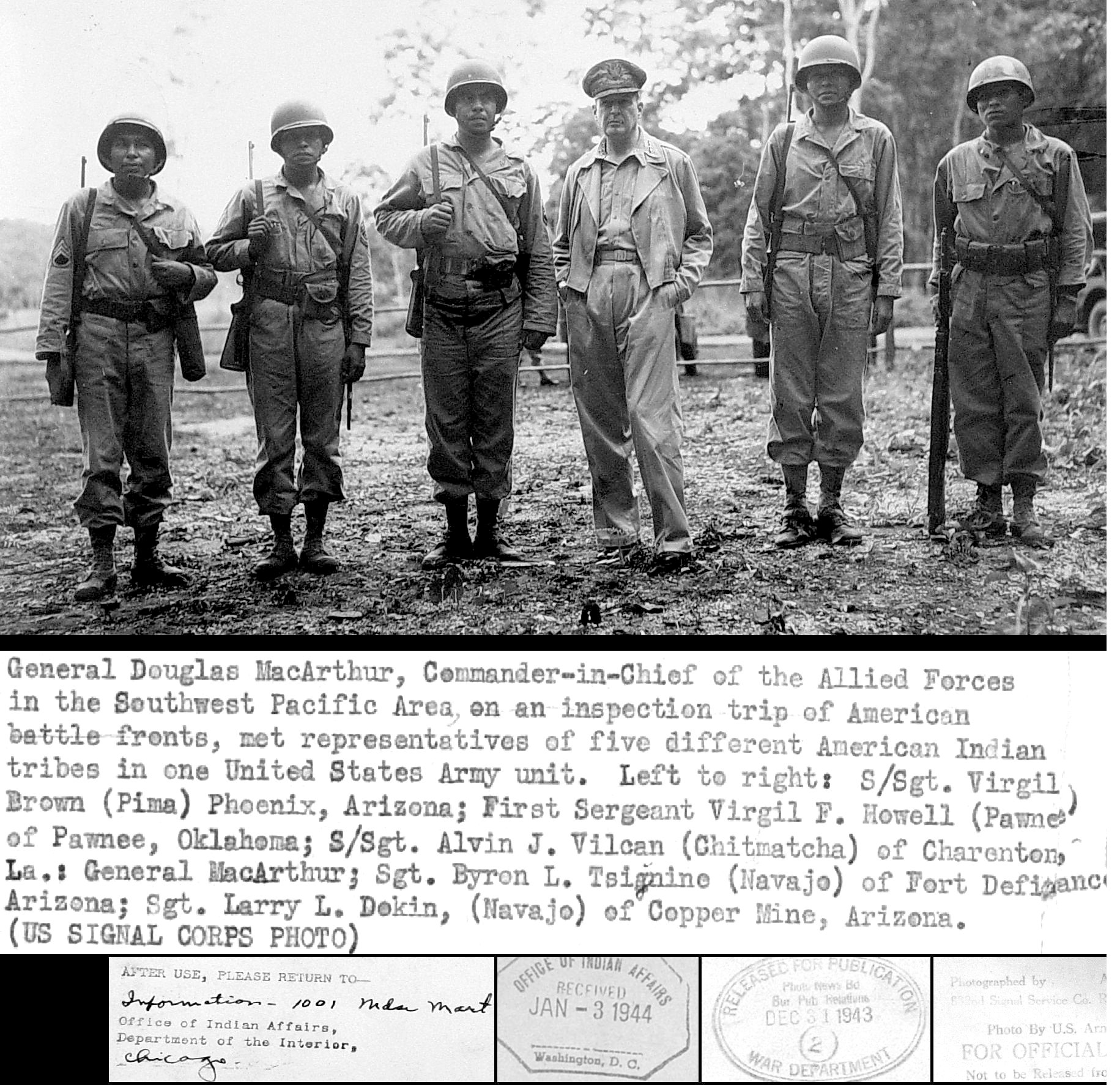
General Douglas MacArthur meeting with Native American troops in 1943, including SSgt. Alvin J. Vilcan of Charenton (third from the left), Louisiana, one of perhaps 70 then-surviving Chitimacha

Since that early 20th-century low, the population has increased as the people have recovered. Men began to gain better employment by working in the Louisiana oil fields as drillers and foremen. In the early 21st century, the tribe reported it has more than 900 enrolled members. The 2000 census reported a resident population of 409 persons living on the Chitimacha Indian Reservation. Of these, 285 identified as solely of Native American ancestry.

The reservation is located at 29°53′02″N 91°31′52″W in the northern part of the community of Charenton, in St. Mary Parish on Bayou Teche. This is in the Atchafalaya Basin, a rich estuary. The Chitimacha are the only Indigenous people in the state who still control some of their traditional lands. As with many Native American tribes, the Chitimacha took over their children's education and have established the Chitimacha Tribal School on the reservation; it is sponsored by the Bureau of Indian Affairs.

Members of the Chitimacha Tribe in 2024 with former Secretary of the Interior, Deb Haaland

The Tribal Council is involved in ongoing negotiations with the United States to obtain compensation for the land expropriations of the past. With revenues derived from its gaming casino, the Chitimacha have purchased additional land to be held in trust for its reservation, and now control 1000 acres. It has established a casino, school, fish processing plant, and tribal museum on its reservation.

=== 21st century ===
Native Waters: A Chitimacha Recollection (2011) is a documentary directed and produced by Laudun for Louisiana Public Broadcasting. It won a 2012 Telly Award.

== Language ==
The Chitimacha language became extinct after the last two native speakers, Benjamin Paul and Delphine Ducloux, died in the 1930s. But young linguist Morris Swadesh had worked with Paul and Ducloux from 1930 to record their language and stories. He made extensive notes in an effort to save the language and its traditional accounts. Most contemporary Chitimacha speak Cajun French and English.

With revenues from gaming, the tribe has established cultural revitalization activities: a tribal historic preservation office, language immersion classes, a tribal museum, and a project to promote river cane regrowth on tribal lands to support weaving traditional baskets. In the early 1990s, the tribe was contacted by the American Philosophical Society Library, which said it held Swadesh's papers and had found extensive notes on the Chitimacha language, including a draft grammar manual and dictionary. A small team was recruited to try to learn the language quickly and begin to prepare materials to transmit it, such as a storybook. Language immersion classes were started in the school for children.

In 2008 the tribe partnered with Rosetta Stone to develop software to document the language and provide teaching materials. Each tribal household was given a copy of the software, to support families learning the language and encouraging children to speak it at home. The collaborative project is also producing a complete dictionary and learner's reference grammar for the language.

== Government ==
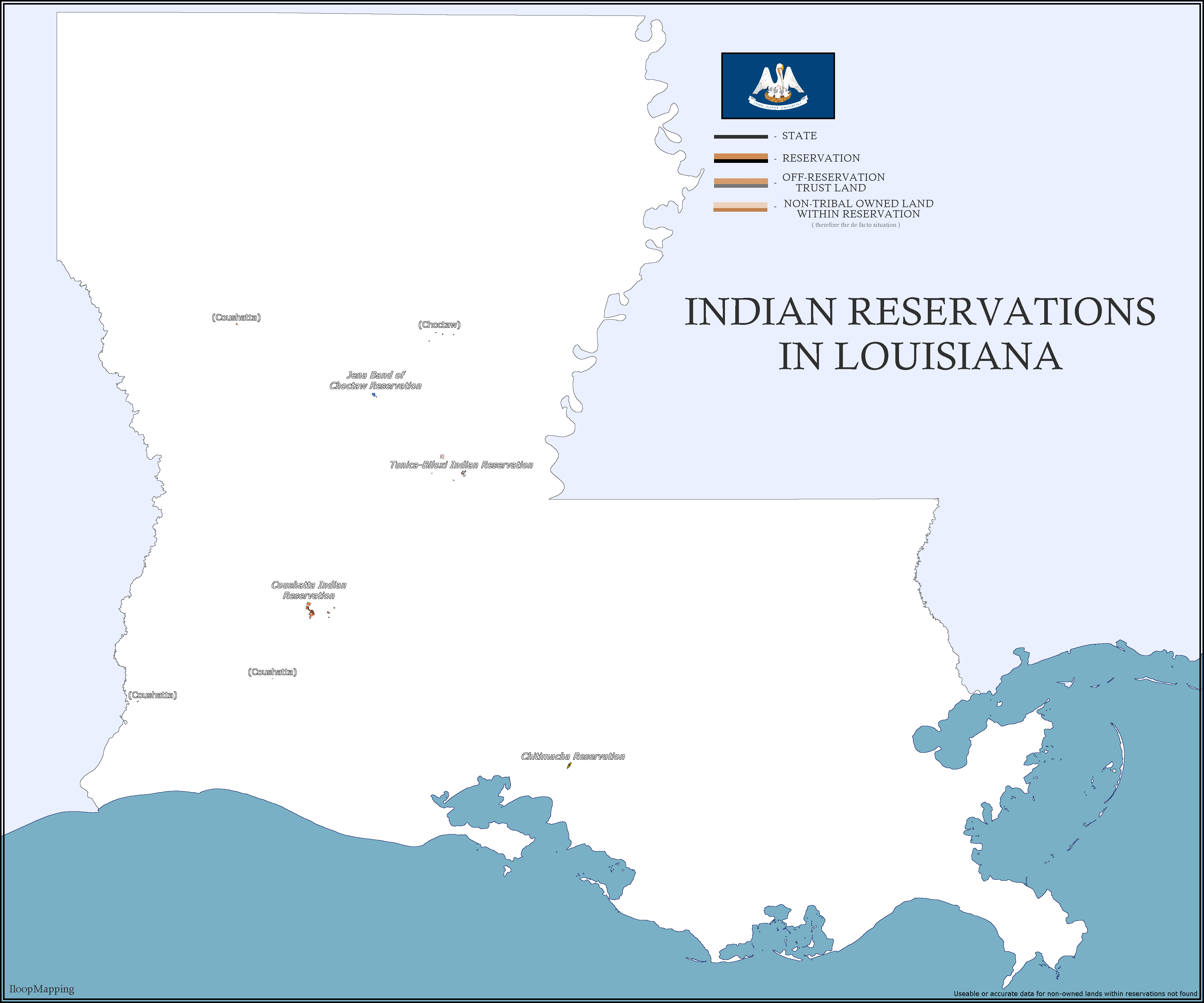
Map of the Chitimacha and neighboring tribes.

The Chitimacha re-established their government under the Indian Reorganization Act of 1934, considered President Franklin D. Roosevelt's Native American New Deal. The tribe successfully resisted efforts in the 1950s to terminate them as a tribe under federal policy of the time, a move which would have ended their relationship with the federal government.

In 1971 they adopted a new written constitution. They have an elected representative government, with two-year terms for the five members of the Tribal Council. Three are elected from single-member districts and two members are elected at-large.

== Citizenship ==
Like all federally recognized tribes, the Chitimacha, through passage of their constitution, have established their own rules for tribal membership. According to the constitution, they require that members have a certain blood quantum and be able to document direct descent from a member listed on one of two official rolls:

- Annuity Pay Roll of 1926, recorded by the Bureau of Indian Affairs, or
- Revised census roll of June 1959, of record at the Choctaw Indian Agency, Philadelphia, Mississippi.

In addition, a prospective member must be able to document having at least one-sixteenth (1/16) degree Chitimacha Indian ancestry (equivalent to one great-great-grandparent). Children of one-sixteenth (1/16) degree or more Chitimacha Indian blood born to any enrolled member since 1971 (when the tribe adopted their Constitution) are entitled to membership.

== Basketry ==
Among their arts, Chitimacha women weave highly refined baskets from rivercane. They typically use three colors: yellow, red, and black. They have woven baskets for sale throughout the centuries to today, as an important part of their economy. One basket maker who excelled at the double-weave technique, Ada Thomas, was honored as a National Heritage Fellow by the National Endowment for the Arts in 1983. Sarah Sense, an acclaimed artist and scholar of Chitimacha/Choctaw descent, has researched Chitimacha basket designs and incorporates these into two-dimensional woven photoworks and three-dimensional woven basket works.

== Notable Chitimacha people ==
- Christine Navarro Paul (1874–1946), basket maker
- Sarah Sense (Chitimacha/Choctaw, born 1980), paper artist, photographer
- Ada Thomas (1924–1992), basket maker
- Ned Romero (1926-2017), actor and singer

== Sources ==
- Chitimacha Reservation, Louisiana United States Census Bureau
