= Fluenz (software) =

US language learning platform

- Developer: Fluenz Inc.
- Platform: Windows, Macintosh, Android, iOS, Audio CD
- License: Proprietary
- Website: fluenz.com

Fluenz is a digital language learning platform developed by Fluenz Inc., a U.S. entrepreneurial company. The interactive content can be downloadable or accessed online on computers and mobile devices. The product range consists of programs to learn Spanish as spoken in Latin America, Spanish as spoken in Spain, French, Italian, Mandarin, German, and Portuguese.

Each Fluenz program is available to users for installation on computers via DVDs as well as full access to an online platform in addition to supplementary tools such as practice CDs, downloadable podcasts, and digital Flashcards optimized for iPads and other tablets.

== History ==
Fluenz Inc. was founded by Cornell graduate Sonia Gil and a group of recent college graduates from Harvard, Oxford and MIT. Fluenz was founded in the idea that the digital teaching of languages could be significantly improved by adding tutor led explanations, by teaching relevant content that would lead to immediate communication, and by trying to use technology to create a more immersive learning process. The company released Fluenz Mandarin for desk and laptops on 31 January 2007. In July of that same year the company launched Fluenz Mandarin Mobile, which contained the entire Mandarin program for Windows Mobile telephones. This was one of the first comprehensive mobile learning programs anywhere. Programs for learning Spanish followed in September 2007, for learning French in May 2008, for learning Italian in June 2008, for learning Spanish from Spain in April 2012, for learning German in April 2012, and for learning Portuguese in October 2013. The Fluenz Commons24, a community of Fluenz users, was launched in 2011, and an online platform of digital Flashcards optimized for iPads, Fluenz Flashcards, came out in beta in March 2011 and in 1.0 version in December 2013.

== Learning system ==
Learning is structured through an immersive user interface that blends a "one on one tutor" on video (over 150 tutorial videos per level of Fluenz) with extensive workouts and a recording tool that allows the user to hear their own pronunciation and compare to that of a native learner’s. Fluenz’ system also focuses first on useful vocabulary, claiming "you’ll be able to order coffee on day one". For example, words like phone and bathroom are prioritized over words like elephant.

One of the key aspects of Fluenz is the notion that it is easier to learn a second or third language by leveraging what the learner already knows. This approach is in contrast to the best-known commercial theory of language learning, "immersion", championed by companies such as Berlitz and Rosetta Stone. Language learning by immersion is based on teaching exclusively in the language being learned. Fluenz refers to their approach as "leverage", as opposed to "immersion".

In practical terms, this means learning a language by understanding its connections with English and emphasizing logic, long-term memory and internalization in the learning process. For example, an English speaker trying to learn Spanish with Fluenz would initially learn in English, and relate basic Spanish grammar and syntax to that of English, rather than trying to understand Spanish grammar with Spanish logic.

== Academic Reviews ==
The Fluenz software has been reviewed in the journal of the Computer Assisted Language Instruction Consortium. According to the reviewer, the Fluenz Mandarin 1+2 software is visually attractive and makes good use of technological features, as well as being pedagogically sound. The review states, "Therefore, Fluenz’s leverage learning approach, in which the structure of the target language (Mandarin, in this case) is directly contrasted to that of the English language makes pedagogical and theoretical sense". The review concludes that "The Fluenz program includes what some researchers believe to be the three elements important for balanced goal development in L2 tasks: fluency, accuracy and complexity".

== Fluenz.org ==
In 2008, Fluenz launched the campaign 'Language is a human right', linked to their non-profit organization Fluenz.org, developing and releasing what they called El Book. El Book is a free primer mainly aimed to Spanish-speaking immigrants with absolutely no prior knowledge of the language on the bare rudiments of English, and without the economic means to take a proper course. Their press release states:

El Book is a free downloadable program containing a booklet and a companion MP3 file designed to help disadvantaged immigrants and refugees of Hispanic origin learn very basic English. The objective is to mobilize concerned people, organizations, and institutions to download it and pass it on to those in need. Made up of a few simple black and white pages, El Book can be printed at home and stapled. It can work on its own or accompanied by an MP3 file that may be downloaded and burned on to a CD. The audio track features Latin American soap star Daniela Alvarado and Fluenz co-founder Sonia Gil, who tutors the program.

== Fluenz Mobile ==
Fluenz has released multiple mobile platforms including Fluenz Flashcards in 2011 and Fluenz Online as part of their cross-platform learning suite coined Fluenz Anywhere. Fluenz Flashcards and Fluenz Online are both browser-based digital learning tools that complement the Fluenz learning method and allow on-the-go learning. The latest addition to Fluenz Anywhere will be released in 2014 in the form of Fluenz iPhone accompanied by a fully revamped release of Fluenz Online and the Flashcards. Fluenz iPhone is described as: "The entire Fluenz program on your iPhone. Ideal to continue your sessions while on the go" and features the entire collection of videos, workouts and dialogues. Fluenz iPhone contains a "Learn Offline" feature which allows users to download up to 3 levels at once onto their device to allow use during long airplane flights and other scenarios where internet connectivity is not possible.

Language	Version	Level 1	Level 2	Level 3	Level 4	Level 5	Audio CDs
Spanish (Latin America)	f 2.10	Yes	Yes	Yes	Yes	Yes	Yes
French	f 2.10	Yes	Yes	Yes	Yes	Yes	Yes
Italian	f 2.10	Yes	Yes	Yes	Yes	Yes	Yes
Mandarin	f 2.10	Yes	Yes	Yes	No	No	Yes
German	f 2.10	Yes	Yes	Yes	Yes	Yes	Yes
Portuguese	f 2.10	Yes	Yes	Yes	Yes	Yes	Yes
Spanish (Spain)	f 2.10	Yes	Yes	Yes	Yes	Yes	Yes

Since 2007, Fluenz made available their mobile companion to the PC software for their Mandarin course, called Fluenz mobile. In the beginning, it was only available for Windows Mobile 5.0 and above, which was not deemed a very popular call. This version was later discontinued as Windows Mobile became a less popular platform, but Fluenz is said to be working on the release of new mobile apps.
