= Kurzweil Educational Systems =

Assistive technology software company

Kurzweil Education
- Type: Software
- Industry: Assistive Technology Software
- Founded: 1996
- Founder: Ray Kurzweil
- Fate: Acquired by Cambium Learning Technologies
- Headquarters: Dallas, Texas
- Products: Kurzweil 1000, Kurzweil 3000
- Services: Professional Development
- Parent: Cambium Learning Technologies
- Website: www.kurzweiledu.com

Kurzweil Education (formerly Kurzweil Educational Systems) is an American assistive technology software company providing literacy tools for people with visual impairments and learning disabilities. The company was founded in 1996 by Ray Kurzweil and is headquartered in Dallas, Texas. Its two principal products are Kurzweil 1000 and Kurzweil 3000, both of which use optical character recognition and text-to-speech technology to make printed and digital content accessible. In 2005, the company was acquired by Cambium Learning Technologies.

== Background ==
The company's technology has roots in Ray Kurzweil's earlier work. In the 1970s, Kurzweil developed the Kurzweil Reading Machine, a device that could optically scan printed text and read it aloud — one of the first practical OCR-based reading aids for the visually impaired. Kurzweil Educational Systems was founded in 1996 to develop software-based successors to this technology for education and accessibility markets.

In 2005, Kurzweil Educational Systems was acquired by Cambium Learning Technologies, which owns several other education-focused companies.

== Products ==
Kurzweil 1000 is designed primarily for users who are blind or visually impaired. It uses optical character recognition and text-to-speech to read aloud web-based, digital or scanned printed materials, including forms, presented in correct reading order.

Kurzweil 3000 is an educational and assistive technology platform providing reading, writing and study support, aimed at users with dyslexia, dysgraphia, and other learning differences, as well as English language learners. It can read aloud digital or scanned text, convert materials to audio files and is accessible via the Firefly web application on tablets.

== See also ==
- K-NFB Reader
- Assistive technology
