= Rosetta Stone (software) =

Proprietary software for learning foreign languages and writing systems

Rosetta Stone Language Learning

- In this screenshot of an Arabic lesson in Rosetta Stone v3, two of the photos have a description in Arabic. The learner decides which of the remaining two photos matches the Arabic description at the top of the screen.
- Developer: Rosetta Stone Inc.
- Release: 1992; 34 years ago
- Stable release: 5.0.37 / October 9, 2014; 12 years ago
- Operating system: Windows 10; Windows 8; Windows 7; Windows Vista; Windows XP; Apple iOS; Mac OS; Android
- Platform: Adobe AIR on x86
- Size: 96.4 MB
- Available in: American English, Arabic, Brazilian Portuguese, British English, Chinese, Dutch, English, Farsi, Filipino, French, German, Greek, Hebrew, Hindi, Irish, Italian, Japanese, Korean, Latin, Mandarin, Persian, Polish, Portuguese, Russian, Spanish, Swedish, Tagalog, and Turkish.
- Type: Computer-assisted language learning
- License: Proprietary
- Website: www.rosettastone.com

Rosetta Stone Language Learning is proprietary, computer-assisted language learning (CALL) software published by Rosetta Stone Inc, part of the IXL Learning family of products. The software uses images, text, and sound to teach words and grammar by spaced repetition, without translation. Rosetta Stone calls its approach Dynamic Immersion.

The software's name and logo allude to the ancient stone slab of the same name on which the Decree of Memphis is inscribed in three writing systems.

IXL Learning acquired Rosetta Stone in March 2021.

Rosetta Stone Inc.
- Type: Subsidiary
- Industry: Software development
- Predecessor: Fairfield Language Technologies
- Founded: 1992; 34 years ago in Harrisonburg, Virginia, United States
- Founder: Allen Stoltzfus, John Fairfield, Eugene Stoltzfus
- Headquarters: Arlington, Virginia, United States
- Area served: Worldwide
- Key people: John Hass (CEO); Tom Pierno (CFO)
- Products: Rosetta Stone Language Learning; Rosetta Stone Kids Reading; Fit Brains; Lexia Learning; Tell Me More
- Revenue: ▼$264.6 million (2013)
- Operating income: ▼$18.4 million (2013)
- Net income: ▼$16.1 million (2013)
- Total assets: ▲$290.8 million (2013)
- Total equity: ▼$131.2 million (2013)
- Owner: Fairfield Language Technologies (1992–2006); ABS Capital Partners and Norwest Equity Partners (2006–2020); Cambium Learning Group (2020–2021); IXL Learning (2021–present)
- Number of employees: 1,375 (2014)
- Website: www.rosettastone.com

== Corporate history ==
Rosetta Stone Inc. is an American education technology software company that develops language, literacy and brain-fitness software. Best known for its language-learning products, in 2013, the company expanded beyond language into education-technology with its acquisitions of Livemocha, Lexia Learning, Fit Brains, and Tell Me More. In 2021, it became a subsidiary of IXL Learning.

Corporate headquarters are in Arlington, Virginia. There are also offices in Harrisonburg, Virginia; Boulder, Colorado; Austin, Texas; Seattle, Washington; Concord, Massachusetts; London, United Kingdom; and Seoul, South Korea.

=== Beginnings ===
According to the company, originator Allen Stoltzfus learned German through immersion while living in West Germany and found it relatively easy. In the 1980s, Stoltzfus began learning Russian in a classroom setting, but found the classroom setting much more difficult. He wanted to simulate the German experience, and he decided to use computer technology to create a similar learning experience. He enlisted the aid of his brother-in-law, John Fairfield, who held a PhD in computer science.

By 1992, CD-ROM technology made the project possible. Allen and John, along with Eugene Stoltzfus (Allen's brother), formed a company known as Fairfield Language Technologies in Harrisonburg, Virginia. They hired Greg Keim and Michael Silverman along with other significant team members. They released their software product under the title The Rosetta Stone.

=== 2000s and IPO ===
In 2003, the company announced the hiring of Tom Adams, a businessman with international experience, as president and CEO.

In 2004, Rosetta Stone Ltd. established its Endangered Language Program to contract with endangered language communities interested in custom software development to support language revitalization efforts.

In 2006, the company changed names to Rosetta Stone, Ltd., and converted from an S corporation to a C corporation. Ownership transferred to investment firms ABS Capital Partners and Norwest Equity Partners.

On September 23, 2008, Rosetta Stone Inc. filed an initial public offering with the Securities and Exchange Commission. On April 15, 2009, the company was listed as the Rosetta Stone on the New York Stock Exchange, raising $112 million in its initial public offering of stock shares. In its first full day of trading on the New York Stock Exchange, the stock gained 39% from its opening price. After a strong opening, however, the stock stumbled amid reports of weaknesses in Rosetta Stone's US business, resulting in the cancellation of a second offering, and a disappointing year end price just 5 cents off its opening price. The stock traded under ticker symbol RST. As of December 2015, the stock was at approximately $29.2 (USD) per share.

=== 2010s ===
In 2013, it acquired four companies:

- Vivity Labs Inc (creators of the Fit Brains Trainer, software marketed for brain training) for around $12 million, but by 2016 Rosetta was looking for a buyer for the product. It was later discontinued on June 7, 2018. Vivity Labs, which originally produced the games, was founded in 2008 in Vancouver, British Columbia by Michael Cole, a game developer, Paul Nussbaum, a neuropsychologist, and Mark Baxter, who had worked in the brain training field for the prior seven years. The platform was started mostly with private investors' money and was also supported by Telefilm Canada and National Research Council Industrial Research Assistance Program (NRC-IRAP).
- Livemocha,
- Tell Me More,
- Lexia Learning.

On September 17, 2013, Rosetta Stone announced the launch of a new Kids Division. In November 2014, it debuted its first kids reading program for consumers, Rosetta Stone Kids Reading.

Since 2016, the company's president and CEO has been John Hass.

Rosetta Stone is transitioning to a cloud-based business model that goes beyond language learning and deeper into education technology.

=== Acquisitions ===
On August 31, 2020, Rosetta Stone announced that they had entered an agreement to be acquired by Cambium Learning Group for $792 million.

On March 17, 2021, Rosetta Stone was acquired by IXL Learning from Cambium Learning Group.

== Dynamic immersion ==
In a Rosetta Stone Language Learning exercise, the learner pairs sound or text to one of several images. The number of images per screen varies.

For example, the software shows the learner four photographs. A native speaker makes a statement that describes one of the photographs, and the statement is printed on the screen; the learner chooses the photograph that the speaker described. In another variation, the learner completes a textual description of a photograph.

In writing exercises, the software provides an on-screen keyboard for the user to type characters that are not in the Latin alphabet or accents that may not be in their native language.

Grammar lessons cover grammatical tense and grammatical mood. In grammar lessons, the program firstly shows the learner several examples of a grammatical concept, and in some levels, the word or words the learner should focus on are highlighted. Then the learner is given a sentence with several options for a word or phrase, and the learner chooses the correct option.

If the learner has a microphone, the software will evaluate word pronunciation using the embedded speech recognition engine, TruAccent.

Each unit contains reviews of the content in those lessons, and each unit concludes with a Milestone activity, which is a simulated conversation that covers the content of the unit.

=== Scoring ===
The program immediately informs the learner whether the answer is right or wrong. Through the Preferences screen, the learner can choose whether a sound is played or not when an answer is clicked. At the bottom of the window, the program shows all the screens for the current lesson. If all answers for that screen are correct, the button for that screen turns green. If some answers are correct, the border of the button turns green, but the screen number itself turns orange. If all answers for a screen are wrong, the button turns orange. This applies to all lessons except review and Milestone lessons, which are treated as tests. In those lessons, the buttons for each screen all remain clear. In all lessons, there is a button that can be hovered over to display how many answers are correct, incorrect, or have not been answered. Each time an answer is clicked, one point is given. At the end of the lesson, the total number of correct, wrong or skipped answers is shown alongside the percentage of correct answers for that lesson. If too many questions were answered incorrectly, the program suggests the learner should retry the lesson.

== Software versions ==
To use Rosetta Stone Language Learning, a student needs the Rosetta Stone application software and at least one level of a language pack. The latest major version of Rosetta Stone is Rosetta Stone Language Learning 5.0.13.

Language packs also have version numbers. The version number of the language pack is distinct from the version numbering scheme of the Rosetta Stone application, and a language pack is only compatible with specific versions of the application. Version 4 and 5 are backward compatible with language packs developed for Version 3, but not older ones.

=== Version 1 ===
By the end of 1996, Rosetta Stone Version 1 had a selection of nine level-one language courses (Dutch, English, French, German, Italian, Mandarin Chinese, Portuguese, Russian, Spanish) and four level-two courses (English, French, German, Spanish). A CD-ROM product called The Rosetta Stone PowerPac featured introductory versions of seven of the courses.

At this time, Fairfield Language Technologies had already begun development of the Arabic, Esperanto, Hebrew, Indonesian, Japanese, Korean, Swahili, Thai, and Vietnamese courses. Within a few months, the Japanese, Thai, and Vietnamese courses were complete, and development of Latin, Polish, and Welsh courses were underway. The Latin course was the next to be completed, followed by Hebrew. In this fashion, Fairfield introduced new courses to market gradually.

Rosetta Stone Version 1 was developed for Macintosh System 6 and higher, and Windows 3.0 and higher. Later revisions of Version 1 for Macintosh required System 7. The final revision of Version 1 was v1.9.

=== Version 2 ===
At Version 2, Fairfield continued to add more language courses, but also marketed more editions of The Rosetta Stone software.

The PowerPac CD-ROM introduced in Version 1 now featured basic lessons in seven languages. One complete level of a language course was now called a Personal Edition of the software.

Because many consumers found The Rosetta Stone to be too expensive, Fairfield started a series of "Explorer" editions. An Explorer CD-ROM was a lower-cost excerpt of a Version 2 course. Each edition of the Rosetta Stone Explorer series (Japanese Explorer, Welsh Explorer, etc.) included three units (22 lessons) from Level 1. The company no longer sells Explorer editions.

Then there was Global Traveler, a CD-ROM and electronic translation dictionary package for people requiring some facility in English, French, Spanish, Italian, or German. The lessons on the CD-ROM teach words and phrases for travelers. The electronic translator was programmed with about 60,000 words and 720 phrases.

==== Compatibility ====
The Rosetta Stone v2.0.x is backward compatible with some of the later language packs for Version 1; specifically languages courses with a version number of 3.0 or 4.0.x.

The Rosetta Stone v2.1 through v2.2.x are only compatible with v6.x language courses. These versions of the language packs and software engine are neither backward compatible nor forward compatible. Language discs developed for The Rosetta Stone v2.0.x are incompatible with these later revisions of the software.

In v2.1.4.1A of The Rosetta Stone, the program began using copy protection software called SafeDisc.

=== Version 3 ===
Rosetta Stone Version 3 is not backward compatible with language packs developed for Rosetta Stone Versions 1 or 2.

Version 3 was initially released in August 2007 for ten bestselling languages, with other languages following later on. The final revision of Version 3 is v3.4.7.r1.

==== Homeschool Edition ====
Homeschool Edition introduces additional features that keep track of time spent per lesson, scores achieved on lessons, lesson plans, and instructional objectives. This edition includes a supplemental CD-ROM that has workbooks, quizzes, lesson transcripts, and exams.

Unlike the Personal Edition, the Homeschool Edition application does not recommend reviews. Aside from the minor differences, the homeschool edition is essentially the same as the personal edition—except for the supplemental CD with written exercises and lesson plans. The language discs in the two editions are identical and are interchangeable. Some may have 3 discs and some may have 5. Much of the information on the supplemental CD-ROM is available online from Rosetta Stone.

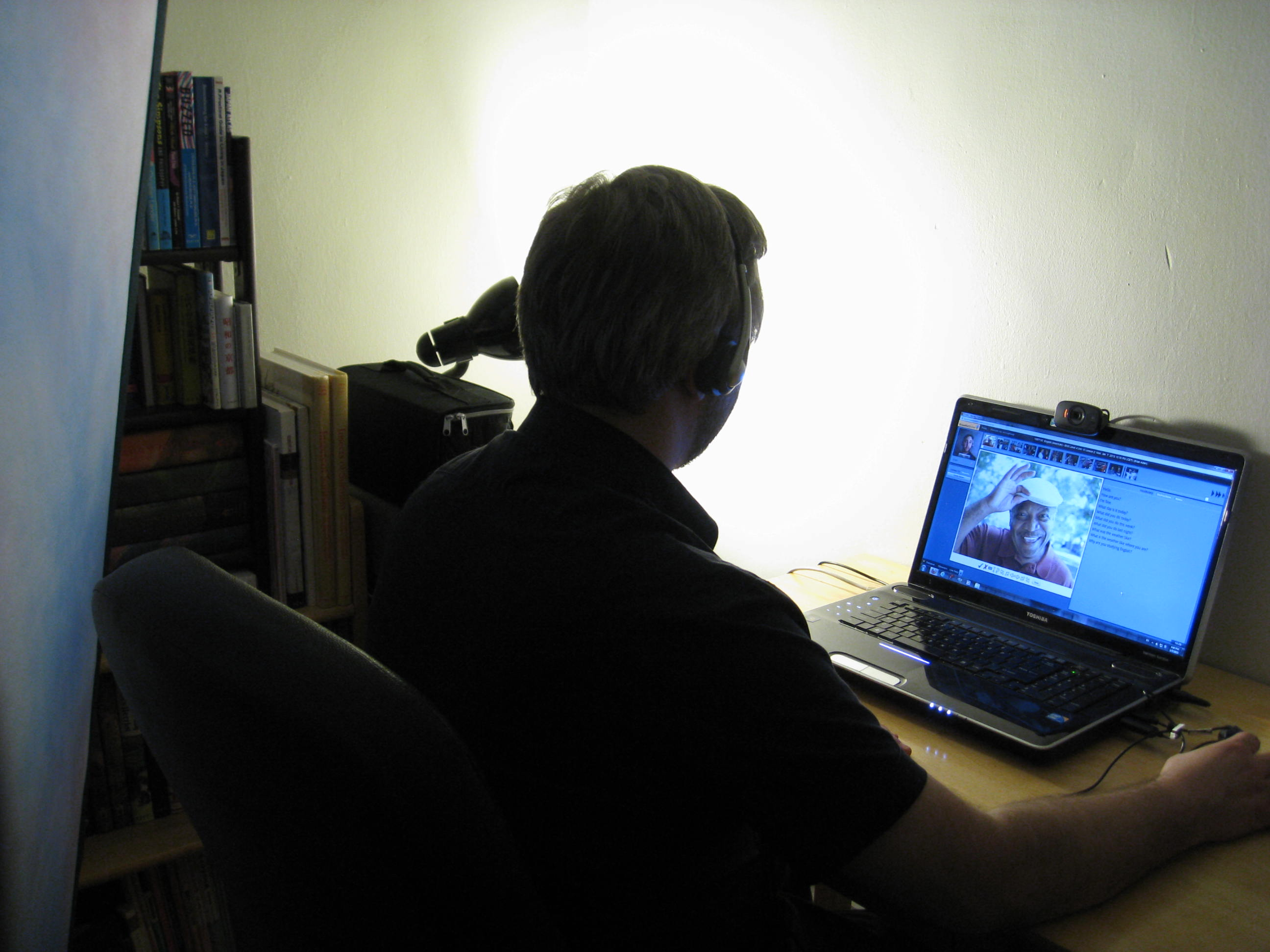
An English as a second or foreign language coach talks with a student via Rosetta Studio.

=== Version 4 TOTALe ===
Version 4 is backward compatible with all language packs developed for Version 3.

Rosetta Stone released Version 4 TOTALe on September 14, 2010. TOTALe is a software suite comprising Rosetta Course, Rosetta Studio, Rosetta World, and TOTALe Mobile Companion. Users of the Rosetta Studio software subscribe to a service that videoconferences them with a language coach. Rosetta World is a social gaming service. TOTALe Mobile Companion is a Rosetta Stone mobile app for iOS and Android devices.

With Version 4, Rosetta Stone adds stricter copy protection measures.

=== Rosetta Stone Language Learning 5.0.13 ===
Rosetta Stone released Version 5 on October 9, 2014. The notable changes are the change in brand name ("Rosetta Course" has become "Language Training"), a new interactive demo is built into the application based on user feedback and a new minimalist UI with no beveled edges or drop shadows.

The software is offered in three variants.

==== Rosetta Stone Language Learning CD-ROM ====
- The core Language Training lessons, up to five levels for certain languages in CDs.
- Audio Companion CDs that supplement your Course lessons. These can be played on CD or MP3 players.
- A USB headset with microphone that is configured for speech recognition technology.
- A three-month trial of Online Subscription.
- the software can be installed on up to 2 computers, for use by up to 5 household members.

==== Rosetta Stone Language Learning Download ====
- The core Language Training lessons, up to five levels for certain languages.
- Instant download (language packs in rsd format) right after the purchase.
- A three-month trial of Online Subscription.
- it can be installed on up to 2 computers, for use by up to 5 household members.

==== Online Subscription ====
- Full access to all Language Training levels for your respective language.
- Games & Community.
- Mobile Apps: Full access to apps no matter what flavor you prefer: Language Companion, Language Training, and Live Tutoring.
- Access to Online features is limited to one user age 13 and up.
- A constant internet connection is required.

Compatibility

The standalone boxed version of the software no longer runs on Modern operating systems due to most browsers dropping support for Adobe Flash. Fortunately, Flash support can be emulated by installing an open-source browser extension called Ruffle for Chrome-based or latest Edge browsers. TOTALe version 4 does not launch, even with the Glash emulation, so users also need to upgrade to version 5.

=== Discover Languages ===
Rosetta Stone's Discover Languages is an app currently only available on Xbox One. It is very different from the traditional design, involving a virtual world and more of a focus on games in order to appeal more strongly to game playing audiences. The only languages currently supported are English and Spanish.

=== Sapphire ===
In early 2026, a new version was released called Rosetta Stone Sapphire with a redesigned interface and containing new features which make use of LLMs.

== Language courses ==
As of October 2024, there are 25 Language Training courses offered by Rosetta. Each language course requires either its own language pack, offered through CD-ROMs or downloads, or online subscription.

Language	Version of Language Pack	Update Version	Level 1	Level 2	Level 3	Level 4	Level 5	Audio Companion	CD-ROM	Download	Online Subscription
Spanish (Latin America)	v3.7.5.3.r5	v3.7.6.2.r10	Yes	Yes	Yes	Yes	Yes	Yes	Yes	Yes	3 – 36 months
Spanish (Spain)	v3.7.5.2.r2	v3.7.6.2.r10	Yes	Yes	Yes	Yes	Yes	Yes	Yes	Yes	3 – 36 months
French	v3.7.5.2.r2	v3.7.6.2.r10	Yes	Yes	Yes	Yes	Yes	Yes	Yes	Yes	3 – 36 months
Italian	v3.7.5.2.r2	v3.7.6.2.r10	Yes	Yes	Yes	Yes	Yes	Yes	Yes	Yes	3 – 36 months
German	v3.7.5.2.r1	v3.7.6.2.r10	Yes	Yes	Yes	Yes	Yes	Yes	Yes	Yes	3 – 36 months
English (American)	v3.7.6.3.r1		Yes	Yes	Yes	Yes	Yes	Yes	Yes	Yes	3 – 36 months
English (British)	v3.7.5.3.r1	v3.7.6.2.r10	Yes	Yes	Yes	Yes	Yes	Yes	Yes	Yes	3 – 36 months
Arabic ^{a}	v3.7.5.2.r2	v3.7.6.2.r10	Yes	Yes	Yes	No	No	Yes	Yes	Yes	3 – 36 months
Chinese (Mandarin)	v3.7.6.3.r2		Yes	Yes	Yes	Yes	Yes	Yes	Yes	Yes	3 – 36 months
Dutch	v3.7.5.2.r2	v3.7.6.2.r10	Yes	Yes	Yes	No	No	Yes	Yes	Yes	3 – 36 months
Farsi (Persian)	v3.7.5.2.r3	v3.7.6.2.r10	Yes	Yes	Yes	No	No	Yes	Yes	Yes	3 – 36 months
Greek	v3.7.5.2.r2		Yes	Yes	Yes	No	No	Yes	Yes	Yes	3 – 36 months
Hebrew ^{b}	v3.7.5.2.r3		Yes	Yes	Yes	No	No	Yes	Yes	Yes	3 – 36 months
Hindi	v3.7.5.2.r3		Yes	Yes	Yes	No	No	Yes	Yes	Yes	3 – 36 months
Irish	v3.7.5.3.r5	v3.7.6.2.r10	Yes	Yes	Yes	No	No	Yes	Yes	Yes	3 – 36 months
Japanese	v3.7.5.3.r5	v3.7.6.2.r10	Yes	Yes	Yes	No	No	Yes	Yes	Yes	3 – 36 months
Korean	v3.7.5.2.r2		Yes	Yes	Yes	No	No	Yes	Yes	Yes	3 – 36 months
Latin	v3.7.x.x.rx		Yes	Yes	Yes	No	No	Yes	Yes	Yes	3 – 36 months
Polish	v3.7.5.2.r2		Yes	Yes	Yes	No	No	Yes	Yes	Yes	3 – 36 months
Portuguese (Brazil)	v3.7.5.2.r2		Yes	Yes	Yes	No	No	Yes	Yes	Yes	3 – 36 months
Russian	v3.7.6.2.r4	v3.7.6.2.r10	Yes	Yes	Yes	Yes	Yes	Yes	Yes	Yes	3 – 36 months
Swedish	v3.7.5.2.r2	v3.7.6.2.r10	Yes	Yes	Yes	No	No	Yes	Yes	Yes	3 – 36 months
Tagalog (Filipino)	v3.7.5.2.r2		Yes	Yes	Yes	No	No	Yes	Yes	Yes	3 – 36 months
Turkish	v3.7.5.2.r2	v3.7.6.2.r10	Yes	Yes	Yes	No	No	Yes	Yes	Yes	3 – 36 months
Vietnamese	v3.7.5.3.r5	v3.7.6.2.r10	Yes	Yes	Yes	No	No	Yes	Yes	Yes	3 – 36 months

- ^a Modern Standard Arabic is a literary language used in the Middle East and north Africa, but it is not a spoken language. See also varieties of Arabic.
- ^b Modern Hebrew is taught, not Biblical Hebrew.

=== Course organization ===
The language courses are divided into three to five levels offered as language packs either in CD-ROMs or Download. In the retail software packages of Rosetta Stone, each CD-ROM has one level.

All languages, except Latin, use mostly the same set of words and sentences in almost the same order, with mainly the same images. Some of the material is reused from lesson to lesson to invoke long-term retention.

In version 3 pack, there are four units per language level. Each unit has four core lessons that are about 30 minutes long. The student then moves on to one of the following lesson modes: Pronunciation, Writing, Vocabulary, Grammar, Listening, Reading, Speaking. The Milestone is an exercise at the end of each unit in which students apply what they learned in the unit.

=== Audio Companion ===
On June 9, 2008, Rosetta Stone introduced an addition to its Version 3 product line: Audio Companion, supplemental audio recordings of words and phrases. The student is meant to repeat the spoken words and phrases for practice and memorization. Unlike recordings based on the Pimsleur method, the Audio Companion provides neither narration nor translations. Rosetta Stone distributes the audio supplements on audio CD and as MP3 files. Each Audio Companion supplements one level of the language course, and each disc supplements a specific unit. Complete Version 4 course packages include Audio Companion material for each level.

=== Endangered Language Program ===
The Endangered Language Program was created in 2004 for use by endangered language communities engaged in language revitalization.

Organizations that contract the Endangered Language Program to develop custom software own the sales and distribution rights over their final product, allowing communities control over this language resource and respecting indigenous intellectual property rights. These versions are thus not marketed via the usual outlets such as bookstores or commercial websites.

Based in Harrisonburg, Virginia, the Endangered Language Program began offering a corporate grant program in 2007 to underwrite development costs for awarded communities. Rosetta Stone Inc. offered the first awards of the grant program to the Chitimacha Tribe of Louisiana and the Navajo Language Renaissance coalition.

The Endangered Language Program also offers paid internships to graduate and undergraduate students interested in contributing to the work of the program.

Language	Organization	Version	Level 1	Level 2	Level 3	Level 4	Level 5	Audio Companion
Chitimacha	Chitimacha Tribe of Louisiana	v2	Yes	Yes	No	No	No	No
Inuktitut	Torngasok Cultural Centre	v2	Yes	No	No	No	No	No
Inupiat	NANA Corporation	v2	Yes	Yes	Yes	No	No	No
Navajo	Navajo Language Renaissance	v2	Yes	Yes	No	No	No	No
Mohawk	Kanien’kehá:ka Onkwawén:na Raotitióhkwa	v2	Yes	Yes	No	No	No	No

In November 2015 the Chickasaw Nation, through the Chickasaw Language Revitalization Program established in 2007, contracted with Rosetta Stone to customize language learning content to preserve and introduce the Chickasaw language to its 60,000+ members worldwide. This effort comes as the Chickasaw Nation has approximately 50 native speakers remaining, with its last monolingual speaker having died in 2013.

Rosetta Stone is currently working on projects for the Mille Lacs dialect of the Ojibwe language and Chikashshanompa' (Chickasaw language) and Chamtéela (Luiseño language). Rosetta Stone has supported Indigenous languages including Diné Bizaad (Navajo language), Kanien'kéha (Mohawk language), Sitimaxa (Chitimacha language), Iñupiaq language (Coastal), Iñupiaq (Kobuk, Alaska/Selawik, Alaska), and Iñupiaq (Alaska North Slope).

== Reception and efficacy ==
=== Critiques from language experts ===
Frequent criticism of the program arises in its lack of sensitivity to the differences between the various languages it comes in and their respective cultures. Early versions of the software presented the same concepts in the same order, using the same images taken mostly in the Washington, D.C. area near the company's headquarters at the time in Harrisonburg, Virginia. In the most recent version, there have been some modifications to the picture set for certain languages or regions.

Another frequent issue was the use of more formal vocabulary than that regularly used by native speakers. In 2006, Macworld reviewer Cyrus Farivar noted that his Persian CD used khodrow for "car", although most native speakers use a French loanword, ma:sheen (in the same way English speakers would be more likely to say "car" than "automobile" in everyday speech). The same course did not teach words that would be important to someone learning Persian, such as "bread" and "tea"; however, it very curiously included the word "elephant" in a basic vocabulary lesson. Perplexed by the question of why the word "elephant" would be taught in a language where it might never be used (there are not many elephants in Iran), Farivar called Rosetta Stone, Inc. He was told that the company makes four different picture sets: one for Western languages, another for Asian languages, and two sets unique to each Swahili and Latin. The Persian language CD was using the Western picture set, which explains why the images were not culturally relevant.

==== Donald McRae on the German course ====
Writing in 1997, Donald McRae of Brock University said that Rosetta Stone represented "good pedagogy" and that "the authors of the program never lose sight of solid teaching methodology". He described the Version 2 German language course as "very good", but indicated that he had "some reservations".

==== Mark Kaiser on the Russian course ====
In a 1997 review of the Version 2 Russian language course, Mark Kaiser, director of the Language Media Center at the University of California, Berkeley, called the program "woefully inadequate for a number of reasons".

One of Kaiser's observations was that Rosetta Stone software fails to provide a relevant cultural context. Because the company uses the same stock photographs for all its language courses, they depict people, activities, and manufactured goods that are conspicuously American. Kaiser also found that Rosetta Stone Version 2 does not provide a way for students to evaluate their conversation skills, and that some of the words and phrases are too English-based.

"The entire package lacks any pedagogical foundation," he concluded. "Rather, it utilizes the glitz of the multimedia capabilities of the computer, a dearth of quality foreign language software, and clever marketing to create an economically successful product."

=== Awards ===
==== From the software industry ====
- 2021 CODiE award: Best Solution for English as a Second Language
- 2011 Adobe MAX Honorable Mention, Disruptive Design
- 2011 South by Southwest Interactive Awards, Educational Resource
- 2010 International CES, Innovation
- 2009 Tech Circle Gold Award for Enterprise Software
- 2009 Children's Technology Review Editor's Choice Award
- 2009 Codie awards, Best Corporate Achievement
- 2008–2009 Codie awards, Best Instructional Solution in Other Curriculum Areas
- 2008 EDDIE Awards for Best Corporate Learning Solution and Best Instructional Solution in Other Curriculum Areas

==== From non-profit organisations ====
- 2012 World Affairs Council of Washington, DC Education Award
- 2009 Association of Educational Publishers Award
- 2011 USDLA International Awards, Excellence in Distance Learning
- 2010 USDLA Silver Award, Best Practices in Distance Learning Programming

==== From magazines ====
- 2011 PCMag.com Editors' Choice Award
- 2011 Practical Homeschooling i-Learn Awards, 1st Place in Foreign Language category; Honorable mention in Latin category
- 2010 Practical Homeschooling i-Learn Awards, 1st Place in Foreign Language category; 1st Place in Latin category
- 2009 Creative Child Media of the Year Award for Educational Media
- 2004–2008, Excellence in Education Award for Foreign Language, The Old Schoolhouse
- 2004–2006, Homeschool Stamp of Approval for Foreign Language, Homeschooling Parent magazine
- 2002–2008, 1st Place in Foreign Language Category, Practical Homeschooling Reader Award

== Institutional use ==
=== United States Army ===
In December 2007, the United States Army offered a special military version of Arabic to help troops deploying to the Middle East learn the language for conversations and phrases important in a military situation. It was available to all US Army personnel, US Military Academy cadets, contracted US Army ROTC Cadets and other special guests with a sponsor.

The United States Army "E-Learning", a SkillPort product, offered the full Version 3 Online, with the exception of only a few languages. The Army E-Learning web site was accessible by most Army members with a valid AKO (Army Knowledge Online) e-mail address or CAC (Common Access Card).

Rosetta Stone's Army contract ended on September 24, 2011.

Other branches of the U.S military also offered Rosetta Stone software. The United States Air Force also offers a similar version to company-grade officers. The United States Marine Corps also offers an online version of all the languages that Rosetta Stone offers through their MarineNet Distance Learning portal.

The U.S. Department of State uses Rosetta Stone (Version 3 as of 2009) as a companion to their in-class and distance learning language programs provided through the Foreign Service Institute. It is free for civil and foreign service employees.

=== James Madison University ===
In April 2011, James Madison University was the first university to partner with Rosetta Stone to offer the Rosetta Stone Version 4 TOTALe as an accredited Conversational Spanish I language learning course. The program teaches Spanish through a series of images that, when clicked on, show the vocabulary word. The student will speak into a microphone and speech recognition software will correct mispronounced words, according to Reilly Brennan, Rosetta Stone's Director of Public Relations. The course is available to adults who want to complete a degree for teaching and non-degree seeking students are eligible to take the class. The Rosetta Stone TOTALe accredited offering is a 16-week, intensive language-learning program. The program is accessed completely online and follows a syllabus approved by Rosetta Stone and James Madison University.

== See also ==
- Distance education
- Duolingo
- Smigin
- E-learning
- Language education
- Language pedagogy
- List of Language Self-Study Programs
- Babbel
- Pimsleur Language Programs
