= Lang-8.com =

Social network (2006-2024)

- Website type: Social Networking Website
- Available in: Japanese, English, Mandarin, Taiwanese, Korean,, Cantonese, Russian, German, French, Portuguese, Italian, Tagalog, Indonesian, Arabic, Dutch, Swedish, Vietnamese, Thai, Finnish, Polish, Norwegian, Turkish, Malay
- Owner: Lang-8 Inc.
- Website: www.lang-8.com
- Commercial: Yes
- Registration: Required
- Launched: August 2006
- Current status: Shut down on February 29, 2024

Lang-8.com was a language exchange social networking website geared towards language learners. The website was run by Lang-8 Inc., which was based in Tokyo, Japan. As of 2017, there were over 750,000 registered users spanning more than 190 countries and 90 languages. Since its closure on February 29, 2024, users have been redirected to their other service, HiNative.

== History ==
Yangyang Xi, born in China and raised in Japan, conceived of Lang-8.com when he was 23 years old. At that time, he was a student at Kyoto University studying abroad in Shanghai, China. There, he kept a journal with his Chinese friends. Yangyang was studying Chinese and wrote entries in Chinese for his friends to correct. In return, his friends wrote entries in Yangyang's primary language (Japanese) for him to correct. This would be the catalyst for Lang-8.

In August 2006, Yangyang and classmate Kazuki Matsumoto created Lang-8.com as a research project. The program was limited to the students of Kyoto University. Between April and August 2007 the website was restructured and on June 29, 2007 YangYang Xi established the Lang-8 Inc. company.

In 2009, Yangyang and Kazuki had a falling out and Kazuki left the company. Yangyang is currently the CEO of the company.

In 2016, Lang-8 raised 200 million Yen.

From February 2017 until the website was shut down, no new user registrations had been allowed. They say they originally planned to lift the suspension after 6 months. In March 2018 they finally extended the suspension without a specific end date. According to their blog post, this suspension was due to the fact that they were a small company and therefore did not have the resources to deal with spammers and bots that had been abusing the platform, and to work on the Lang-8 app and its sister service HiNative simultaneously.

On February 29, 2024, Lang8 was permanently shut down. The website link now directs users to HiNative, their other service.

== Features ==
=== Features common to all accounts ===
Users were able to post in the language(s) they were learning and that post would appear to native speakers of that language for correction. Users were limited to two learning languages. Users could also correct posts written in their native language. The correction feature included things such as color coding, bold, and strikethrough.

=== Premium account features ===
Entries posted by premium account members were given priority display which increased the likelihood of receiving a correction. Other premium account features included the ability to add images to entries, download PDF versions of entries/corrections, add an unlimited number of learning languages, hide advertisements, perform personal journal searches, customize the background with images, and make suggestions to improve correction entry.

== Community ==
From December 2013 until the website shut down, the website had over 750,000 registered members and experienced solid growth. However, users had been unable to register and have been redirected to their other service, HiNative, which had about 240,000 users by the end of September 2016, since March 2017.

The user base was made up of people from over 190 countries, speaking around 90 different languages. The primary user base was Japanese, with approximately 30% of users originating from Japan.

== Awards ==
In 2009, Lang-8.com received the Wish2009 IT Media Award with notable recognition for marketability. The Wish2009 is an event that showcases innovative startup web services.
