= Charenton, Louisiana =

Charenton, Louisiana Lieu-des-Chetimachas
- Census-designated place
- Location of Charenton in Louisiana
- Coordinates: 29°53′01.47″N 91°31′37.78″W
- Country: United States
- State: Louisiana
- Parish: St. Mary

Area
  - Total: 5.22 sq mi (13.51 km^{2})
  - Land: 4.97 sq mi (12.86 km^{2})
  - Water: 0.25 sq mi (0.65 km^{2})
- Elevation: 13 ft (4.0 m)

Population (2020)
  - Total: 1,699
  - Density: 342.1/sq mi (132.07/km^{2})
- Time zone: UTC-6 (CST)
  - Summer (DST): UTC-5 (CDT)
- Area code: 337
- FIPS code: 22-14310
- Website: www.chitimacha.gov

Charenton (historically French: Lieu-des-Chetimachas) is a census-designated place (CDP) in St. Mary Parish, Louisiana, United States. As of the 2020 census, Charenton had a population of 1,699. It is part of the Morgan City Micropolitan Statistical Area.

== History ==
Charenton is home to one community of Chitimacha people. In 1855, the Chitimacha were seriously reduced by yellow fever that struck the region. In 1881, the Chitimacha were located on Grand Lake or Lake Fausse. The census of 1900 listed six families of Chitimacha, with a total of 55 people. During this period, the Chitimacha's land base had continued to decline as reservation land was divided again and again among members unable to pay the annual taxes. As a result, the land was sold. A court divided the last 505 acres (2.04 km^{2}) of the reservation in 1903, but attorney's fees claimed 280 acres (1.1 km^{2}) of it two years later. Answering a plea from the Chitimacha women, Miss Sarah Avery McIlhenney purchased the land at a sheriff's sale in 1915 and immediately ceded it to the federal government who in turn placed the land in trust for the tribe. Federal recognition followed in 1917, and the Chitimacha became the only tribe in Louisiana to achieve such status. This new recognition and the land held in trust could not have come at a better time. World War I and the pressure it placed on oil companies led to exploration in the region and purchase of land there.

With their land secure, many Chitimacha found employment in the new Louisiana oil fields as drillers and foremen. Following the passage of the Indian Reorganization Act in 1934, the Chitimacha created a new tribal organization. Unfortunately, their small enrollment and success in finding work outside their reservation led to an attempt by the government to terminate their federal status in 1952. This move was ultimately defeated, and the Chitimacha, growing in number and organization, put into effect a constitution and bylaws in 1971 that remain in effect today.

The Chitimacha operate a museum, fish processing plant and school on the reservation. In addition, what began as a bingo operation grew into a lucrative casino that operates on the tribe's land in Charenton. Revenue from the Cypress Bayou casino has provided the Chitimacha with funds used to recover land historically part of the reservation. Consequently, land that had dwindled to just 260 acres (1.1 km^{2}) has now swelled to over a thousand acres (4 km^{2}). The Chitimacha are an important part of Charenton's history as well as a major part of the current community.

== Geography ==
Charenton is located at 29°53′01.47″N 91°31′37.78″W (29.88436373442272,-91.5274459771368).

According to the United States Census Bureau, the CDP has a total area of 5.2 square miles (13.5 km^{2}), of which 5.0 square miles (12.9 km^{2}) is land and 0.23 square miles (0.6 km^{2}), or 4.79%, is water.

== Demographics ==
Historical population
Census	Pop.	Note	%±
1990	1,584		—
2000	1,944		22.7%
2010	1,903		−2.1%
2020	1,699		−10.7%
U.S. Decennial Census; 1950 1960 1970 1980; 1990 2000 2010

Charenton first appeared as a census designated place the 1990 U.S. census.

Charenton racial composition as of 2020
Race	Number	Percentage
White (non-Hispanic)	787	46.32%
Black or African American (non-Hispanic)	388	22.84%
Native American	416	24.48%
Asian	3	0.18%
Other/Mixed	70	4.12%
Hispanic or Latino	35	2.06%

As of the 2020 United States census, there were 1,699 people, 665 households, and 414 families residing in the CDP.

== Education ==
The Chitimacha Tribal School, a K-8 school, is affiliated with the Bureau of Indian Education (BIE). It is in Charenton.

In 1937 a two classroom public school building condemned by the St. Mary Parish School Board was moved to Charenton, and began serving the community as a 1-8 school; the student population went over 60. In 1968 the kindergarten was established. The Bureau of Indian Affairs (BIA) built a new school, which began operations in 1978, to replace the former facility. It had 38 in the 1978–1979 school year, but this went down to 29 in 1980-1981 and 22 in 1981–1982. In 1982 it got a funding cut due to Reaganomics, which led to fears that the school could close.

St. Mary Parish School Board operates local public schools.
