= Endangered language =

Language that is at risk of going extinct

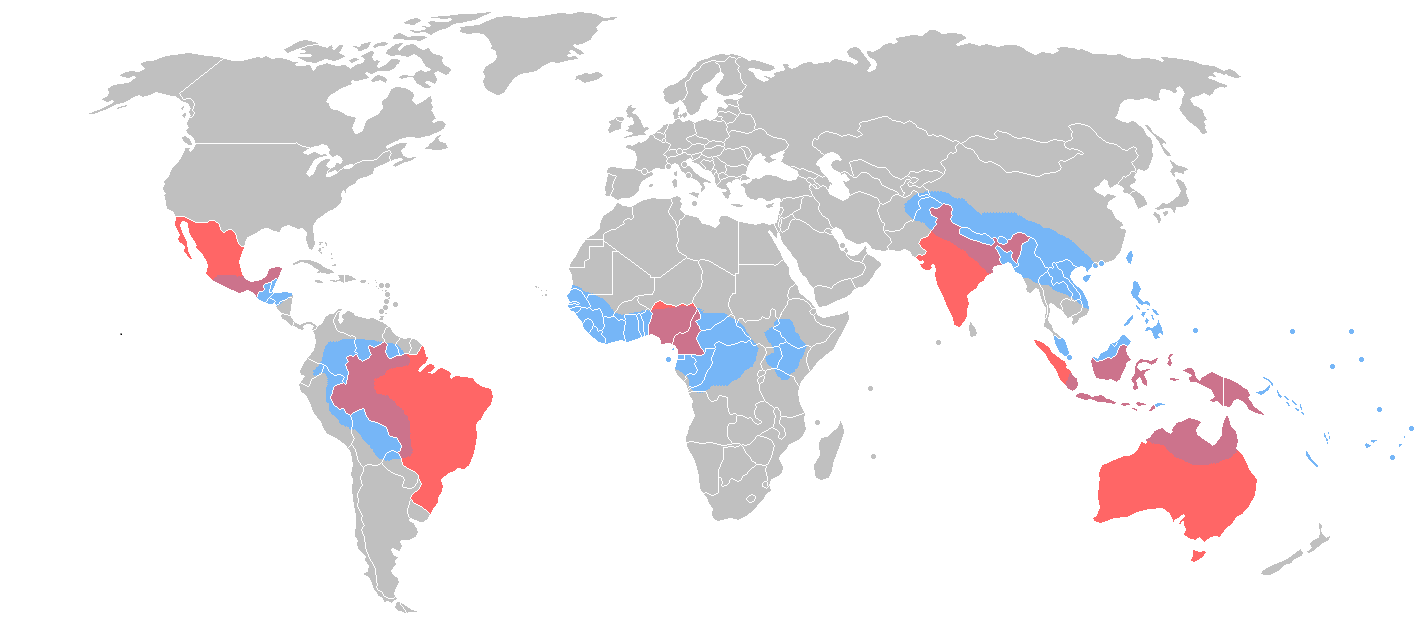
More than 50% of the world's endangered languages are located in just eight countries (denoted in red on the map): India, Brazil, Mexico, Australia, Indonesia, Nigeria, Papua New Guinea and Cameroon. In these countries and around them are the areas that are the most linguistically diverse in the world (denoted in blue on the map).

Language death can be the result of language shift in which ethnic group members no longer learn their heritage language as their first language.

An endangered language or moribund language is a language that is at risk of disappearing as its speakers die out or shift to speaking other languages. Language loss occurs when the language has no more native speakers and becomes a "dead" or "extinct language". A dead language may still be studied through recordings or writings, but it is still considered dead or extinct once there are no more fluent speakers left. Although languages have always become extinct throughout human history, factors currently accelerating the rate of language death include globalization, mass migration, linguistic imperialism, neocolonialism, and linguicide (language killing).

Language shift most commonly occurs when speakers switch to a language associated with social or economic power or one spoken more widely, leading to the gradual decline and eventual death of the endangered language. The process of language shift is often influenced by factors such as globalisation, economic authorities, and the perceived prestige of certain languages. The ultimate result is the loss of linguistic diversity and cultural heritage within affected communities.

The general consensus is that between 6,000 and 7,000 languages are currently spoken. Some linguists estimate that between 50% and 90% of them will be severely endangered or dead by the year 2100. The 20 most common languages, each with more than 50 million speakers, are spoken by 50% of the world's population, but most languages are spoken by fewer than 10,000 people.

The first step towards language death is potential endangerment. This is when a language faces strong external pressure, but there are still communities of speakers who pass the language to their children. The second stage is endangerment. Once a language has reached the endangerment stage, there are only a few speakers left and children are, for the most part, not learning the language. The third stage of language extinction is seriously endangered. During this stage, a language is unlikely to survive another generation and will soon be extinct. The fourth stage is moribund, followed by the fifth stage extinction.

Many projects are under way aimed at preventing or slowing language loss by revitalizing endangered languages and promoting education and literacy in minority languages, often involving joint projects between language communities and linguists. Across the world, many countries have enacted specific legislation aimed at protecting and stabilizing the language of indigenous speech communities. Recognizing that most of the world's endangered languages are unlikely to be revitalized, many linguists are also working on documenting the thousands of languages of the world about which little or nothing is known.

In the present era, dialects of many 'safe' languages are gradually becoming endangered due to various reasons. But this matter is often neglected. Some widely spoken languages have endangered regional dialects, such as the varieties of English spoken on the American east coast, such as Eastern New England English and High Tider dialects.

== Number of languages ==
The total number of contemporary languages in the world is not known, and it is not well defined what constitutes a separate language as opposed to a dialect. Estimates vary depending on the extent and means of the research undertaken, and the definition of a distinct language and the current state of knowledge of remote and isolated language communities. The number of known languages varies over time as some of them become extinct and others are newly discovered. An accurate number of languages in the world was not yet known until the use of universal, systematic surveys in the later half of the twentieth century. The majority of linguists in the early twentieth century refrained from making estimates. Before then, estimates were frequently the product of guesswork and very low.

One of the most active research agencies is SIL International, which maintains a database, Ethnologue, kept up to date by the contributions of linguists globally.

Ethnologue's 2005 count of languages in its database, excluding duplicates in different countries, was 6,912, of which 32.8% (2,269) were in Asia, and 30.3% (2,092) in Africa. This contemporary tally must be regarded as a variable number within a range. Areas with a particularly large number of languages that are nearing extinction include: Eastern Siberia, Central Siberia, Northern Australia, Central America, and the Northwest Pacific Plateau. Other hotspots are Oklahoma and the Southern Cone of South America.

=== Endangered sign languages ===
Almost all of the study of language endangerment has been with spoken languages. A UNESCO study of endangered languages does not mention sign languages. However, some sign languages are also endangered, such as Alipur Village Sign Language (AVSL) of India, Adamorobe Sign Language of Ghana, Ban Khor Sign Language of Thailand, and Plains Indian Sign Language. Many sign languages are used by small communities; small changes in their environment (such as contact with a larger sign language or dispersal of the deaf community) can lead to the endangerment and loss of their traditional sign language. Methods are being developed to assess the vitality of sign languages.

== Defining and measuring endangerment ==
How UNESCO's Atlas of the World's Languages in Danger classifies languages

While there is no definite threshold for identifying a language as endangered, UNESCO's 2003 document entitled Language vitality and endangerment outlines nine factors for determining language vitality:

1. Intergenerational language transmission
2. Absolute number of speakers
3. Proportion of speakers existing within the total (global) population
4. Language use within existing contexts and domains
5. Response to language use in new domains and media
6. Availability of materials for language education and literacy
7. Government and institutional language policies
8. Community attitudes toward their language
9. Amount and quality of documentation

Many languages, for example some in Indonesia, have tens of thousands of speakers, but are endangered because children are no longer learning them, and speakers are shifting to using the national language (e.g. Indonesian) in place of local languages. In contrast, a language with only 500 speakers might be considered very much alive if it is the primary language of a community, and is the first (or only) spoken language of all children in that community.

Asserting that "Language diversity is essential to the human heritage", UNESCO's Ad Hoc Expert Group on Endangered Languages offers this definition of an endangered language: "... when its speakers cease to use it, use it in an increasingly reduced number of communicative domains, and cease to pass it on from one generation to the next. That is, there are no new speakers, adults or children."

UNESCO operates with four levels of language endangerment between "safe" (not endangered) and "extinct" (no living speakers), based on intergenerational transfer: "vulnerable" (not spoken by children outside the home), "definitely endangered" (children no longer learning the language), "severely endangered" (only spoken by older generations), and "critically endangered" (youngest speakers are grandparents and older, often semi-speakers). UNESCO's Atlas of the World's Languages in Danger categorises 2,473 languages by level of endangerment.

As of November 2025, these categories are currently being reviewed by UNESCO to ensure they reflect the most up-to-date information on language vitality worldwide. Updates aim to provide an accurate and reliable representation of the current status of languages, supporting efforts in documentation, preservation, and revitalization.

Using an alternative scheme of classification, linguist Michael E. Krauss defines languages as "safe" if it is considered that children will probably be speaking them in 100 years; "endangered" if children will probably not be speaking them in 100 years (approximately 60–80% of languages fall into this category) and "moribund" if children are not speaking them now.

Many scholars have devised techniques for determining whether languages are endangered. One of the earliest is GIDS (Graded Intergenerational Disruption Scale) proposed by Joshua Fishman in 1991. In 2011 an entire issue of Journal of Multilingual and Multicultural Development was devoted to the study of ethnolinguistic vitality, Vol. 32.2, 2011, with several authors presenting their own tools for measuring language vitality. A number of other published works on measuring language vitality have been published, prepared by authors with varying situations and applications in mind.

== Causes ==
According to the Cambridge Handbook of Endangered Languages, there are four main types of causes of language endangerment:

Causes that put the populations that speak the languages in physical danger, such as:

1. War and genocide. Examples of this are the languages of the native population of Tasmania who died from diseases or were killed by European colonists, and many extinct and endangered languages of the Americas where indigenous peoples have been subjected to genocidal violence. The Miskito language in Nicaragua and the Mayan languages of Guatemala have been affected by civil war.
2. Natural disasters, famine, disease. Any natural disaster severe enough to wipe out an entire population of native language speakers has the capability of endangering a language. An example of this is the languages spoken by the people of the Andaman Islands, who were seriously affected by the 2004 Indian Ocean earthquake and tsunami.

Causes that prevent or discourage speakers from using a language, such as:

1. Cultural, political, or economic marginalization creates a strong incentive for individuals to abandon their language (on behalf of themselves and their children as well) in favor of a more prestigious language; one example of this is assimilatory education. This often happens when indigenous populations and ethnic groups who were once subject to colonization and/or earlier conquest, in order to achieve a higher social status, have a better chance to get employment and/or acceptance in a given social network only when they adopt the cultural and linguistic traits of other groups with enough power imbalance to culturally integrate them, through various means of ingroup and outgroup coercion (see below); examples of this kind of endangerment are the cases of Welsh, Scottish Gaelic, and Scots in Great Britain; Irish in Ireland; Sardinian in Italy; the Ryukyuan languages and Ainu in Japan; and Chamorro in Guam. This is also the most common cause of language endangerment. Ever since the Indian government adopted Hindi as the official language of the union government, Hindi has taken over many languages in India. Other forms of cultural imperialism include religion and technology; religious groups may hold the belief that the use of a certain language is immoral or require its followers to speak one language that is the approved language of the religion (like Arabic as the language of the Quran, with the pressure for many North African groups of Amazigh or Egyptian descent to Arabize). There are also cases where cultural hegemony may often arise not from an earlier history of domination or conquest, but simply from increasing contact with larger and more influential communities through better communications, compared with the relative isolation of past centuries.
2. Political repression. This has often happened when nation-states, as they work to promote a single national culture, limit the opportunities for using minority languages in the public sphere, schools, the media, and elsewhere, sometimes even prohibiting them altogether. Sometimes ethnic groups are forcibly resettled, or children may be removed to be schooled away from home, or otherwise have their chances of cultural and linguistic continuity disrupted. This has happened in the case of many Native American, Louisiana French and Australian languages, as well as European and Asian minority languages such as Breton, Occitan, or Alsatian in France and Kurdish in Turkey.
3. Urbanization. The movement of people into urban areas can force people to learn the language of their new environment. Eventually, later generations will lose the ability to speak their native language, leading to endangerment. Once urbanization takes place, new families who live there will be under pressure to speak the lingua franca of the city.
4. Intermarriage can also cause language endangerment, as there will always be pressure to speak one language to each other. This may lead to children only speaking the more common language spoken between the married couple.

Often multiple of these causes act at the same time. Poverty, disease and disasters often affect minority groups disproportionately, for example causing the dispersal of speaker populations and decreased survival rates for those who stay behind.

=== Marginalization and endangerment ===
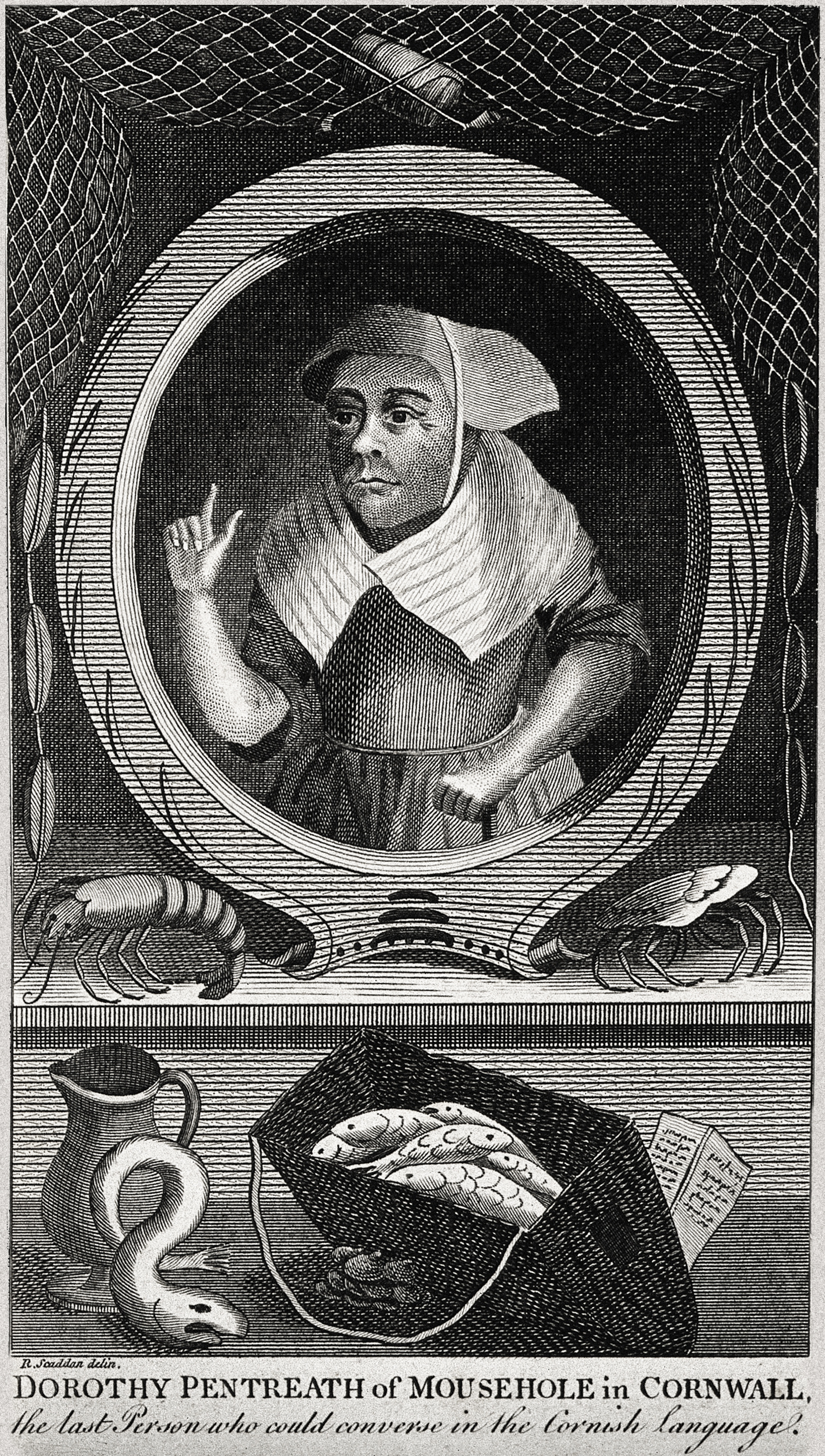
Dolly Pentreath, last known native speaker of the Cornish language, in an engraved portrait published in 1781

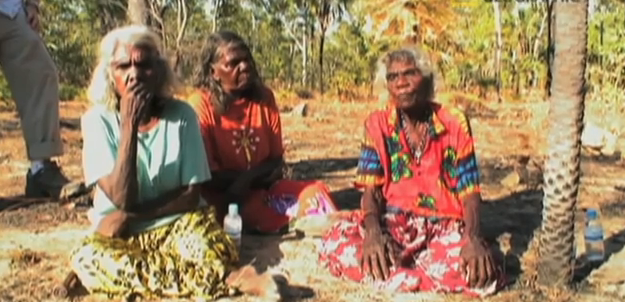
The last three native speakers of Magati Ke

Among the causes of language endangerment cultural, political and economic marginalization accounts for most of the world's language endangerment. Scholars distinguish between several types of marginalization: Economic dominance negatively affects minority languages when poverty leads people to migrate towards the cities or to other countries, thus dispersing the speakers. Cultural dominance occurs when literature and higher education is only accessible in the majority language. Political dominance occurs when education and political activity is carried out exclusively in a majority language.

Historically, in colonies, and elsewhere where speakers of different languages have come into contact, some languages have been considered superior to others: often one language has attained a dominant position in a country. Speakers of endangered languages may themselves come to associate their language with negative values such as poverty, illiteracy and social stigma, causing them to wish to adopt the dominant language that is associated with social and economical progress and modernity. Immigrants moving into an area may lead to the endangerment of the autochthonous language.

Dialects and accents have seen similar levels of endangerment during the 21st century due to similar reasons.

== Effects ==
Language endangerment affects both the languages themselves and the people that speak them. This also affects the essence of a culture.

=== Effects on communities ===
As communities lose their language, they often lose parts of their cultural traditions that are tied to that language. Examples include songs, myths, poetry, local remedies, ecological and geological knowledge, as well as language behaviors that are not easily translated. Furthermore, the social structure of one's community is often reflected through speech and language behavior. This pattern is even more prominent in dialects. This may in turn affect the sense of identity of the individual and the community as a whole, producing a weakened social cohesion as their values and traditions are replaced with new ones. This is sometimes characterized as anomie. Losing a language may also have political consequences as some countries confer different political statuses or privileges on minority ethnic groups, often defining ethnicity in terms of language. In turn, communities that lose their language may also lose political legitimacy as a community with special collective rights. Language can also be considered as scientific knowledge in topics such as medicine, philosophy, botany, and more. It reflects a community's practices when dealing with the environment and each other. When a language is lost, this knowledge is often lost as well.

In contrast, language revitalization is correlated with better health outcomes in indigenous communities.

=== Effects on languages ===
During language loss—sometimes referred to as obsolescence in the linguistic literature—the language that is being lost generally undergoes changes as speakers make their language more similar to the language that they are shifting to. For example, gradually losing grammatical or phonological complexities that are not found in the dominant language.

=== Ethical considerations and attitudes ===
Generally the accelerated pace of language endangerment is considered to be a problem by linguists and by the speakers. However, some linguists, such as the phonetician Peter Ladefoged, have argued that language death is a natural part of the process of human cultural development, and that languages die because communities stop speaking them for their own reasons. Ladefoged argued that linguists should simply document and describe languages scientifically, but not seek to interfere with the processes of language loss. A similar view has been argued at length by linguist Salikoko Mufwene, who sees the cycles of language death and emergence of new languages through creolization as a continuous ongoing process.

A majority of linguists do consider that language loss is an ethical problem, as they consider that most communities would prefer to maintain their languages if given a real choice. They also consider it a scientific problem, because language loss on the scale currently taking place will mean that future linguists will only have access to a fraction of the world's linguistic diversity, therefore their picture of what human language is—and can be—will be limited.

Some linguists consider linguistic diversity to be analogous to biological diversity, and compare language endangerment to wildlife endangerment.

== Response ==
Linguists, members of endangered language communities, governments, nongovernmental organizations, and international organizations such as UNESCO and the European Union are actively working to save and stabilize endangered languages. Once a language is determined to be endangered, there are three steps that can be taken in order to stabilize or rescue the language. The first is language documentation, the second is language revitalization and the third is language maintenance.

Language documentation is the documentation in writing and audio-visual recording of grammar, vocabulary, and oral traditions (e.g. stories, songs, religious texts) of endangered languages. It entails producing descriptive grammars, collections of texts and dictionaries of the languages, and it requires the establishment of a secure archive where the material can be stored once it is produced so that it can be accessed by future generations of speakers or scientists.

Language revitalization, also known as language revival or reversing language shift, is the process by which a language community attempts to increase the number of active speakers of the endangered language, typically through political, community, and educational means. For case studies of this process, see Anderson (2014). Applied linguistics and education are helpful in revitalizing endangered languages. Vocabulary and courses are available online for a number of endangered languages.

Language maintenance refers to the support given to languages that need for their survival to be protected from outsiders who can ultimately affect the number of speakers of a language. UNESCO seeks to prevent language extinction by promoting and supporting the language in education, culture, communication and information, and science.

Another option is "post-vernacular maintenance": the teaching of some words and concepts of the lost language, rather than revival proper.

As of June 2012 the United States has a J-1 specialist visa, which allows indigenous language experts who do not have academic training to enter the U.S. as experts aiming to share their knowledge and expand their skills.

== See also ==
- Lists of endangered languages
- Language death
- List of endangered languages with mobile apps
- Lists of extinct languages
- List of languages by time of extinction
- List of revived languages
- Atlas of the World's Languages in Danger
