= Gamification of learning =

Educational approach using video game design and elements

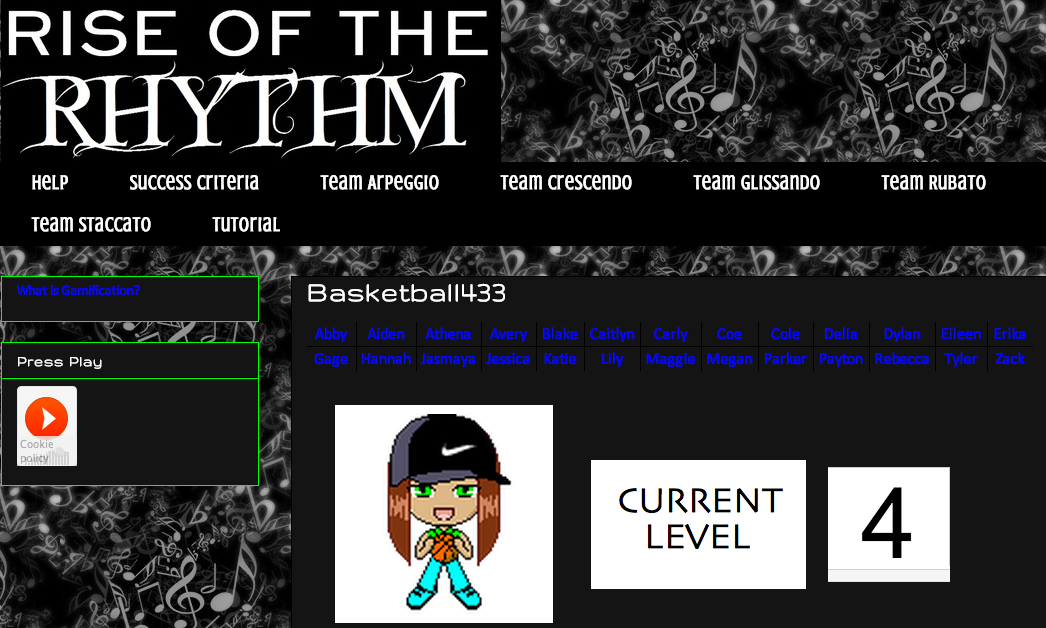
The gamified music learning platform Rise of the Rhythm

The gamification of learning is an educational technology approach that seeks to motivate students by using video game design and game elements in learning environments. The objective is to boost engagement by attracting learners' attention and encouraging their ongoing participation in the learning process. Broadly defined, gamification is the process of defining the elements which comprise games, make those games fun, and motivate players to continue playing, then using those same elements in a non-game context to influence behavior. In other words, gamification is the introduction of game elements into a traditionally non-game situation. In the process of gamification of learning, two primary approaches are commonly used: serious games and structural gamification.

Serious games are intentionally developed with educational objectives at their core. In these games, learning goals are integrated directly into the gameplay, allowing students to acquire knowledge and skills through immersive interactive experiences. For example, DragonBox is a math-based adventure game that teaches algebraic concepts through puzzle-solving. Similarly, iCivics places students in simulated civic roles such as campaigning for office, creating laws, or debating Supreme Court cases to teach government and citizenship. Another widely used example is Minecraft: Education Edition, which enables learners to explore subjects like science, history, and coding in a creative and collaborative environment. In contrast, structural gamification involves adding game-like features such as points, badges, leaderboards, and avatars to traditional classroom activities. Unlike serious games, the core instructional content remains unchanged; instead, these game elements are layered on top to boost motivation and engagement.

Teachers might implement a reward system for completing a standard math worksheet, or use platforms like Kahoot! to deliver competitive quizzes. Tools like Google Forms can also be enhanced with digital badges to recognize student achievement in weekly assessments. While structural gamification can increase classroom participation and motivation, it may not lead to improved academic outcomes on its own. For gamification to be truly effective, it must move beyond superficial incentives and be meaningfully aligned with the desired learning outcomes. In educational settings, desired student behaviors resulting from effective gamification include increased class attendance, sustained focus on meaningful learning tasks, and greater student initiative. In addition to employing game elements in non-game contexts, it can actively foster critical thinking and student engagement. This approach encourages students to explore their own learning processes through reflection and active participation, enabling them to adapt to new academic contexts more effectively. By framing assignments as challenges or quests, gamified strategies help students develop metacognitive skills that enable them to strategize and take ownership of their learning journey.

Gamification of learning does not involve students in designing and creating their own games or in playing commercially produced video games, making it distinguishable from game-based learning, or using educational games to learn a concept. Within game-based learning initiatives, students might use Gamestar Mechanic or GameMaker to create their own video game or explore and create 3D worlds in Minecraft. In these examples, the learning agenda is encompassed within the game itself. Some authors contrast gamification of learning with game-based learning. They argue that gamification occurs only when learning happens in a non-game context, such as a school classroom. Under this classification, when a series of game elements is arranged into a "game layer", or a system which operates in coordination with learning in regular classrooms, then gamification of learning occurs. Other examples of gamified content include games that are created to induce learning.

== Game elements that can facilitate learning ==
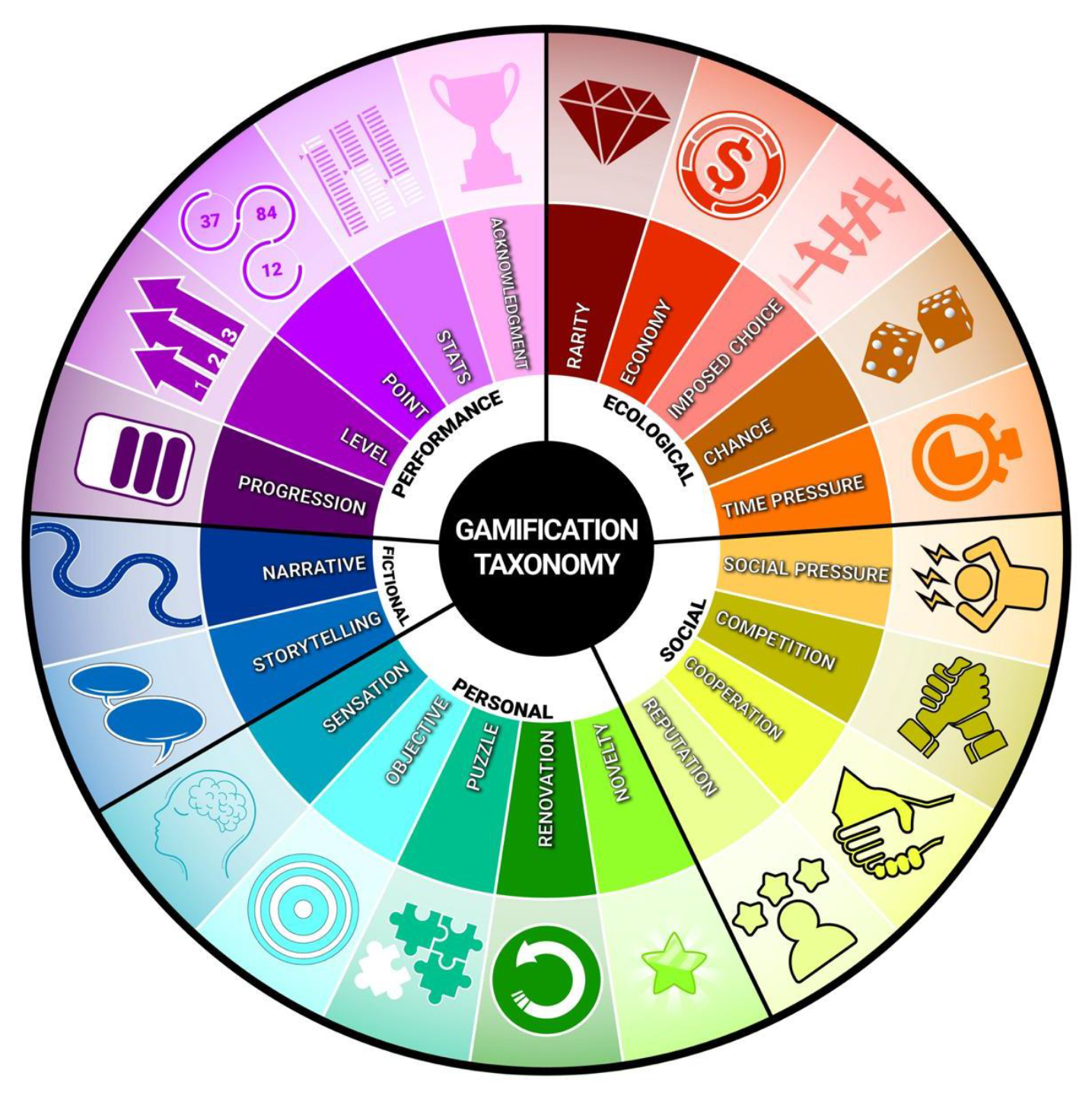
A gamification taxonomy for education

Some elements of games that may be used to motivate learners and facilitate learning include progress mechanics (points/badges/leaderboards, or PBLs), narrative and characters, player control, immediate feedback, opportunities for collaborative problem solving, scaffolded learning with increasing challenges, opportunities for mastery and leveling up, and social connection. A more complete taxonomy of game elements used in educational contexts divide 21 game elements into five dimensions. When a classroom incorporates the use of some of these elements, that environment can be considered "gamified". There is no distinction as to how many elements need to be included to officially constitute gamification, but a guiding principle is that gamification takes into consideration the complex system of reasons a person chooses to act, and not just one single factor. Progress mechanics, which need not make use of advanced technology, are often thought of as constituting a gamified system When used in isolation, these points and opportunities to earn achievements are not necessarily effective motivators for learning.

Engaging video games that can keep players playing for hours on end do not maintain players' interest by simply offering the ability to earn points and beat levels. Rather, the story that carries players along, the chances for players to connect and collaborate with others, the immediate feedback, the increasing challenges, and the powerful choices given to players about how to proceed throughout the game, are immensely significant factors in sustained engagement. Business initiatives designed to use gamification to retain and recruit customers, but do not incorporate a creative and balanced approach to combining game elements, may be destined to fail. Similarly, in learning contexts, the unique needs of each set of learners, along with the specific learning objectives relevant to that context must inform the combination of game elements to shape a compelling gamification system with the potential to motivate learners.

A system of game elements which operates in the classroom is explicit, and consciously experienced by the students in the classroom. There is no hidden agenda by which teachers attempt to coerce or trick students into doing something. Students still make autonomous choices to participate in learning activities. The progress mechanics used in the gamified system can be thought of as lighting the way for learners as they progress, and the other game mechanics and elements of game design are set up as an immersive system to support and maximize students' learning. A study introducing a gamified project-based learning (PBL) framework found that combining hands-on learning with game elements improved student engagement, project completion, and learning outcomes in a university computing course. The framework offers customizable templates and processes for instructors. Although designed for project-centric courses, it shows promise for broader application and integration with learning platforms.

== Benefits ==
Gamification initiatives in learning contexts acknowledge that large numbers of school-aged children play video games, which shapes their identity as people and as learners. While the world of gaming used to be skewed heavily toward male players, recent statistics show that slightly more than half of videogame players are male: in the United States, 59% male, 41% female, and 52% male, 48% female in Canada. Within games and other digital media, students experience opportunities for autonomy, competence and relatedness, and these affordances are what they have come to expect from such environments. Providing these same opportunities in the classroom environment is a way to acknowledge students' reality, and to acknowledge that this reality affects who they are as learners. Incorporating elements from games into classroom scenarios is a way to provide students with opportunities to act autonomously, to display competence, and to learn in relationship to others.

Game elements are a familiar language that children speak, and an additional channel through which teachers can communicate with their students. Game designer Jane McGonigal characterizes video game players as urgent optimists who are part of a social fabric, engaged in blissful productivity, and on the lookout for epic meaning. If teachers can successfully organize their classrooms and curriculum activities to incorporate the elements of games which facilitate such confidence, purpose and integrated sense of mission, students may become engrossed in learning and collaborating such that they do not want to stop. The dynamic combination of intrinsic and extrinsic motivators is a powerful force; if educational contexts can adapt from video games, it may increase student motivation, and student learning. Some of the potential benefits of successful gamification initiatives in the classroom include:

- giving students ownership of their learning;
- opportunities for identity work through taking on alternate selves;
- freedom to fail and try again without negative repercussions;
- chances to increase fun and joy in the classroom;
- opportunities for differentiated instruction;
- making learning visible;
- providing a manageable set of subtasks and tasks; and
- inspiring students to discover intrinsic motivators for learning.

Referring to how video games provide increasingly difficult challenges to players, game designer Amy Jo Kim suggested that every educational scenario could be set up to operate this way. This game mechanic which involves tracking players' learning in the game, and responding by raising the difficulty level of tasks at just the right moment, keeps players from becoming unnecessarily frustrated with tasks that are too difficult, as well as keeps players from becoming bored with tasks that are too easy. This pacing fosters continued engagement and interest which can mean that learners are focused on educational tasks, and may get into a state of flow, or deeply absorbed in learning.

In gamified e-learning platforms, massive amount of data are generated as a result of user interaction and action within the system. These actions and interactions can be properly sampled, recorded, and analyzed. Meaningful insights on performance behaviors and learning objectives can be useful to teachers, learners, and application developers to improve the learning. These insights can be in form of a quick feedback to learners on the learning objectives while the learner still operates within the rules of play. Data generated from games can also be used to uncover patterns and rules to improve the gamified e-learning experience.

Another study shows that adding game-like features to education can help students stay motivated, learn better, and work well with others. The study also shows how gamification can help students build useful skills for school and their future jobs. With mobile technology and cloud storage, students and teachers can access learning tools anytime, even in remote areas. The study points out that gamification is still seen as a side tool, but it could become more important over time. It also recommends more research on how well gamification works in different places and over longer periods, especially in countries that are updating their education systems.

In a large systematic review of the literature regarding the application of gamification in higher education, benefits that were identified included positive effects in student engagement, attitude, performance, and enjoyment although these are mediated by the context and design. A study on gamification in university courses found that thoughtfully integrating game elements into academic content can significantly improve student motivation, participation, and perceived learning. These insights that for gamification to succeed broadly, universities must support educators with hands-on training and opportunities for innovation, making it a promising strategy to enhance both teaching quality and student engagement.

== Impact of gamification on different learning styles and neurodivergent learners ==
A growing body of research highlights gamification as an effective pedagogical strategy for accommodating diverse learning styles through multimodal engagement. According one view, gamification fosters dynamic learning environments that align with a broad spectrum of learner preferences, particularly when students are given the flexibility to interact with content at their own pace. Gamified instructional models typically incorporate visual, auditory, and kinesthetic elements, enabling educators to address individual differences in how learners process and retain information.

For instance, visual learners benefit from features such as badges, progress bars, game maps, and colorful visuals, which enhance their learning experience and motivation. Auditory learners are engaged through sound cues, narration, and auditory feedback, while kinesthetic learners thrive through active participation, decision-making, and hands-on interaction. By addressing multiple learning modalities, gamification fosters an active and participatory learning environment that accommodates various learner needs. In support of this, a study applying the Felder-Silverman Learning Style Model, which categorizes learning preferences into active or reflective, visual or verbal, sensing or intuitive, and sequential or global, found that 78.9% of students responded positively to gamified courses. Elements such as badges, experience points, and ranking lists were shown to increase motivation for 80–95% of students. Interestingly, "mystery" as a game element increased engagement for intuitive learners but reduced motivation for sensing learners. Time limits benefited active and sequential learners but discouraged sensing learners. The study concluded that gamification is most effective when tailored to individual learning styles; when there is a mismatch between game elements and learner preferences, motivation and participation may decrease, leading to poorer academic outcomes.

Gamification is proven to support neurodivergent learners, such as those with ADHD, autism, or dyslexia. Its effectiveness largely depends on thoughtful and inclusive design. When implemented appropriately, gamified instruction can increase motivation and focus in learners with ADHD by breaking content into short, goal-oriented tasks. For autistic learners, the structured format and immediate feedback help clarify expectations and reduce anxiety. Similarly, personalization features such as customizable avatars, adjustable pacing, and visual progress tracking enable learners with dyslexia or processing differences to engage at their own pace, reducing cognitive overload. Evidence from a 2025 study supports these benefits. Among 72 neurodiverse secondary students (aged 12–16) across three inclusive schools, task completion rates rose significantly from 63.2% to 87.4% following the introduction of a gamified hybrid learning model, a 24.2% increase. Additionally, average focus duration improved from 18.5 to 28.7 minutes, and self-reported learning confidence increased from 2.9 to 4.1 on a 5-point scale. These findings illustrate how well-designed gamification can create more inclusive and empowering educational environments for neurodivergent learners. Poorly designed gamified environments may be counterproductive as overstimulation from excessive visuals or sound may distract learners with sensory sensitivities. Additionally, competitive elements can trigger anxiety or frustration in learners with social-emotional challenges, and therefore an inclusive design is critical. When gamification is implemented with accessibility in mind, it can foster a learning environment where all students feel included, empowered, and supported in their learning journey.

== Application ==
Common ways to integrate gamification in education is creating battles, digital games such as Kahoot! or Quizlet, or playing old-school games such as bingo or scavenger hunts. With regard to language, instead of referring to academic requirements with the typical associated terms, game-like names may be used instead. For example, making a course presentation might be referred to as "embarking on a quest", writing an exam might be "defeating monsters", and creating a prototype might be classed as "completing a mission". In terms of grading, the grading scheme for a course might be adapted to make use of experience points (XP) as opposed to letter grades. Each student can begin at level one with zero points; as they progress through the course, completing missions and demonstrating learning, they earn XP. A chart can be developed to illustrate how many XP is required to earn a letter grade. For example, earning 1,500 XP might translate to a C, while 2,000 would earn a B, and 2,500 an A. Some teachers use XP, as well as health points (HP) and knowledge points (KP) to motivate students in the classroom but do not connect these points with the letter grades students get on a report card. Instead these points are connected with earning virtual rewards such as badges or trophies.

In first-year composition (FYC) courses, gamification has been successfully implemented through tasks like "Quest" and "Random Encounters". Quests are designed as extended assignments that encourage students to engage deeply with specific topics, often involving research, collaborative writing, or creative problem-solving. These tasks enable students to develop essential research and collaborative skills, which are critical for academic success and professional growth. By working on complex, multi-step challenges, students learn to approach problems systematically and think critically about their solutions. Random Encounters are shorter, impromptu tasks that require students to apply critical thinking and adaptability in unpredictable scenarios, such as responding to a challenging writing prompt or analyzing an unfamiliar text. Such activities help students build resilience and navigate uncertain or complex situations, equipping them to handle dynamic challenges in academic, professional, and everyday contexts. Gamified tasks also encourage students to actively engage with course material, fostering a sense of exploration and agency in their learning journey. These examples highlight the varied applications of gamified tasks, which also depend on the roles played by teachers and the structure of the learning environment.

The structure of a course or unit may be adapted in various ways to incorporate elements of gamification; these adaptations can affect the role of the student, the role of the teacher, and role of the learning environment. The role of a student in a gamified environment might be to adopt an avatar and a game name with which they navigate through their learning tasks. Students may be organized into teams or guilds, and be invited to embark on learning quests with their fellow guild members. They may be encouraged to help other guild members, as well as those in other guilds, if they have mastered a learning task ahead of others. Students tend to express themselves as one of the following game-player types; player (motivated by extrinsic rewards), socialiser (motivated by relatedness), free spirit (motivated by autonomy), achiever (motivated by mastery), and philanthropist (motivated by purpose). The role of the teacher is to design a gamified application, embedding game dynamics and mechanics that appeal to the target group (i.e. students) and provide the type of rewards that are attractive to the motivation of the majority. Therefore, it is important teachers know their students so they are able to best design a gamified program that not only interests the students but also one in which matches the specific learning goals that hit on elements of knowledge from the curriculum.

The teacher needs to responsibly track student achievements with a web-based platform, such as Open Badges, the WordPress plug-in GameOn, or an online spreadsheet. The teacher may also publish a leaderboard online which illustrates the students who have earned the most XP, or reached the highest level of play. The teacher may define the parameters of the classroom "game", giving the ultimate learning goal a name, defining the learning tasks which make up the unit or the course, and specifying the rewards for completing those tasks. The other important role of the teacher is to provide encouragement and guidance for students as they navigate the gamified environment. The role of a gamified learning environment is often defined by an overarching narrative that frames and unifies all learning activities. For example, learners may be invited to collaborate in a mission where they must thwart a zombie invasion or investigate a murder mystery task that can only be completed through engagement with course content. In these designs, learning remains central, while the narrative acts as an immersive contextual frame. Occasionally, the storyline directly relates to academic subjects such as halting a fictional epidemic through biology lessons, whereas in other cases, it's more abstract, as when music students perform repertoire to symbolically ascend a mountain, facing setbacks and challenges along the way. Beyond narrative, gamified environments also incorporate theme-appropriate music at key moments to enhance immersion, alongside nearly instantaneous feedback loops designed to sustain motivation. A blend of solo and collaborative challenges accommodates different learning preferences, and offers students autonomy such as choosing which learning activities to tackle, how to approach tasks, and in what sequence supports engagement and a sense of agency. These practices are grounded in substantial gamification research: narrative is known to anchor learning via immersive story structures and cognitive scaffolding, while game elements such as autonomy, feedback, and challenge correlate strongly with intrinsically motivated, deeper learning outcomes.

== History ==
Even without the intentional use of gamified elements, traditional schooling has long incorporated features that resemble game mechanics. As early as the 1700s, grading systems were introduced in schools, functioning much like reward points to motivate students to complete assignments and perform well on exams. By the early 20th century, influenced by developments in behavioral psychology, structured reward systems became more common in classrooms, offering students tangible incentives such as free time, school supplies, or treats in exchange for academic or behavioral achievements. This practice aligns with B.F. Skinner's theory of operant conditioning, which posits that behaviors followed by positive reinforcement are more likely to be repeated. In this framework, classroom rewards increase student engagement and cooperation by linking academic success with immediate, motivating outcomes. Building on these long-standing behavioral strategies, the concept of gamification emerged as a more formalized approach to motivation and engagement. The term was first coined in 2002 by British computer programmer Nick Pelling, who has since been referred to as the "Godfather of Gamification". Pelling described it as the application of game elements to non-game contexts, including education, to enhance user engagement; however, the practice of integrating game-like strategies into learning predates the formal use of the term. While some critics argue that gamification is merely a new label for long-standing educational practices, the modern concept extends far beyond simple reward-based systems. Rather than offering incentives for isolated behaviors, gamification in learning has evolved into a multifaceted approach that integrates psychology, design principles, strategy, and technology to influence motivation and participation. The widespread use of gamification has been largely fueled by advancements in digital and mobile technologies.

These developments have enabled scalable, interactive, and socially connected platforms. Outside the classroom, examples include customer loyalty programs like those offered by Starbucks and Shoppers Drug Mart, location-based apps like Foursquare, and health-focused platforms such as Fitbit, Fitocracy, and BACtrack. These applications use game elements like points, badges, and leaderboards to drive behavioral change and encourage continued participation. In education, gamification adopts these same mechanics to boost student engagement and motivation. Although it is difficult to determine precisely when gamification began appearing in educational contexts, online examples shared by classroom teachers began surfacing around 2010, marking the beginning of its more widespread adoption in schools. Teaching machines with gamification features were developed by cyberneticist Gordon Pask from 1956 onwards, after he was granted a patent for an "Apparatus for assisting an operator in performing a skill". Based on this patent, Pask and Robin McKinnon-Wood built the Self-Adaptive Keyboard Instructor (SAKI) for teaching students how to use the Hollerith key punch, a data entry device using punched cards. The punched card was common until the 1970s and there was significant demand for skilled operators. SAKI treats the student as a "black box", building a probabilistic model of their performance as it goes. The machine stores the response times for different exercises, repeating exercises for which the operator has the slowest average response time, and increasing the difficulty of exercises where the operator has performed successfully. SAKI could train an expert key-punch operator in four to six weeks, a reduction of between 30 and 50 percent over other methods. For an operator to perform a skill efficiently, the presented data "should always be of sufficient complexity to maintain his interest and maintain a competitive situation, but not so complex as to discourage the operator". SAKI led to the development of teaching software such as the typing tutor Mavis Beacon Teaches Typing, which is fondly remembered by students of touch typing. According to Ashley Fetters of The Washington Post, Mavis Beacon was a revolutionary tool for teaching an entire generation how to type. By incorporating game-like elements to motivate students, the software was designed to improve typing speed and accuracy through structured lessons, drills, and interactive activities. These components included gamified symbols and mechanics that effectively engaged learners in goal-oriented practice.

== Effectiveness ==
The effectiveness of gamification in education remains a debatable topic, as demonstrated by a study involving 98 undergraduate students enrolled in a Software Engineering course at a tertiary institution. Participants were divided into two groups: a gamified group (46 students) and a control group (52 students). The gamified group used an online platform integrated with game elements such as challenges, badges, leaderboards, and progress tracking, while the control group received the same instructional content through traditional teaching methods. The research challenges common assumptions about the universal benefits of using games in education. While students in the gamified group achieved higher scores in practical assignments and overall performance, they performed more poorly on written tasks and showed lower levels of class participation, despite initially reporting higher motivation. The researchers concluded that gamification in e-learning platforms can enhance certain learning outcomes but may also hinder others, indicating that its use should be carefully tailored to learning objectives and contexts.

On the one hand, qualitative analysis of the study suggests that gamification can have a great emotional and social impact on students, as reward systems and competitive social mechanisms seem to be motivating for them. On the other hand, quantitative analysis suggests that the cognitive impact of gamification on students is not very significant. Students who followed traditional exercises performed similarly in overall score than those who followed gamified exercises. Disadvantages of gamified learning were reported by 57 students who did not want to participate in the gamified experience. The most frequent reason argued by students was "time availability". The second most important reason were technical problems. Other reasons were that there were too many students and that they had to visit so many web pages and applications at the university that they did not want to use a new one. A study on university calculus students found that leaderboards in a gamified environment significantly improved learning performance, although they did not enhance motivation or self-efficacy, suggesting the need for thoughtful design in educational gamification.

Another field where serious games are used to improve learning is health care. Researchers investigated the developing of serious games potential in nursing education and found that few nursing students have long-term exposure to home-care and community situations, and new pedagogical tools are needed to adequately and consistently prepare nurses for the skills needed to care for patients outside acute care settings. Advances in information and communications technologies offer an opportunity to explore innovative pedagogical solutions that could help students develop these skills in a safe environment. For example, Laboratory simulations with high fidelity mannequins have become an integral element in many health care curricula. A 2010 systematic review found evidence suggesting that the use of simulation mannequins significantly improved three outcomes integral to clinical reasoning: knowledge acquisition, critical thinking and the ability to identify deteriorating patients.

A 2012 study investigated Virtual University, an American version of a serious game. Results showed that learning using this serious game has educational values that are based on learning concepts advocated by constructivist psycho-cognitive theories. It guarantees intrinsic motivation, generates cognitive conflicts and provides situated learning. The use of Virtual University allowed the researchers to identify the following key points: from its playfulness combined with video game technologies, the tool was able to motivate learners intrinsically; the simulation game also recreates learning situations extremely close to that of reality, especially considering the complexity, dynamism and all of the interrelations and interactions that exist within the university system. This is a major educational advantage by encouraging an intense interaction that generates real cognitive or socio-cognitive conflicts, providing a solid construction of knowledge; an autonomy in the learning process following a strong metacognitive activity; and an eventual transfer of acquired skills. In another study involving an American-based school, gamification was integrated into all its subjects. Both students and teachers indicated they derived maximum satisfaction from a gamified form of learning; however, results from standardized tests showed a slightly improved performance, and in some cases, below-average performance in comparison to other schools. Enough evidence-based research needs to be carried out to objectively measure the effectiveness of gamification of learning across varying factors.

More recent meta-analyses have found larger positive effects. A 2023 meta-analysis of 41 studies involving 5,071 participants, published in Frontiers in Psychology, found that gamified learning produces a large effect size (Hedges' g = 0.822) on learning outcomes compared to traditional instruction. A 2024 meta-analysis of 22 experimental studies in the British Journal of Educational Technology confirmed this finding, reporting Hedges' g = 0.782 across geographical regions, education levels, and subjects.

== Legal restrictions ==
=== Data privacy and protection ===
Gamification in education must be implemented with careful attention to legal and ethical obligations, which can vary significantly across countries and regions. Key concerns include data privacy, accessibility, intellectual property, and consumer protection. While specific laws may differ, several legal standards are commonly upheld across jurisdictions. One of the most pressing legal issues in gamified education is data privacy. Platforms that collect student information must adhere to national and international data protection laws. In the European Union, the General Data Protection Regulation (GDPR) mandates clear consent for data collection and outlines strict rules for managing personal data In the United States, the Children's Online Privacy Protection Act (COPPA) restricts the collection of data from children under the age of 13, which is especially relevant for gamified tools used in primary and secondary education.

Administrators and instructors have a responsibility to safeguard learners' privacy rights. The collection and use of Personally Identifiable Information (PII) and other user-generated data must be transparently outlined in a privacy policy that is easily accessible to all users. In addition to institutional responsibilities, educators play a crucial role in fostering digital literacy by teaching students how to protect their privacy online. To effectively address privacy concerns, a shared responsibility model was proposed. In this model, developers are expected to design gamified learning systems with built-in privacy protections, while users—especially students must be educated on how to manage their personal information responsibly. Supporting this approach, students should be taught to:

- avoid sharing sensitive personal information (e.g., full name, address, phone number, etc.);
- use nicknames or avatars instead of real names;
- review and adjust privacy settings to control data visibility;
- disable location tracking and other non-essential features; and
- create strong and unique passwords for each platform.

the growing presence of online platforms made some people believe that there is a need to embed critical digital awareness into educational curricula, citing that equipping students with these skills empowers them to navigate gamified learning environments safely and responsibly.

==== Accessibility and Inclusion ====
Beyond data privacy, accessibility and anti-discrimination laws are critical considerations. Educational platforms must ensure that students with disabilities are not excluded, and failure to meet these requirements may result in non-compliance and hinder equal access to education. This aligns with legal requirements such as the Americans with Disabilities Act of 1990 (ADA) in the United States and the Accessibility for Ontarians with Disabilities Act (AODA) in Canada. To comply with these standards, platforms should include features like screen reader compatibility, keyboard navigation, and alternative formats for content.

==== Intellectual property and copyright ====
Gamified e-learning systems often incorporate visual and interactive elements such as avatars, badges, and game-based narratives. Educators must be mindful of intellectual property laws when using such elements. If they rely on existing copyrighted assets, they must obtain appropriate permissions from the rights holders. To avoid legal risks, many educators choose to design and implement original game elements tailored to their educational content and context. LeapFrog, a company that manufactures e-learning toys, smart toys, and educational games for children, was at the center of a hacking scandal in December 2018 involving its LeapPad Ultimate, a rugged gaming and e-learning tablet designed for young users. The tablet had security errors that allowed third-parties to message users, scrape personal information from users and get into the WiFi networks of users, most of whom were minors. This led to concerns regarding pedophiles using the tablets as a way to groom potential victims.

== Criticism ==
Gamification of learning has been criticized for its use of extrinsic motivators, which some teachers believe must be avoided since they have the potential to decrease intrinsic motivation for learning (overjustification). This idea is based on research which emerged first in the early 1970s, and has been made popular in the 2000s by Daniel Pink. Some teachers may criticize gamification for taking a less than serious approach to education. This may be a result of the historical distinction between work and play which perpetuates the notion that the classroom cannot be a place for games, or a place for fun. Gameplay in some views may be seen as being easy, irrelevant to learning, and applicable only to very young children.

Teachers who criticize the gamification of learning might feel that it is not worth their time to implement gaming initiatives, either because they themselves are stretched thin with the number of responsibilities that they already have, or because they fear that the curriculum might not be covered if any time is spent dedicated to anything other than engagement with that curriculum. Gamification of learning has been also criticized as ineffective for certain learners and for certain situations. Videogame theorist Ian Bogost criticized gamification for its tendency to take a simplistic and manipulative approach which does not reflect the real quality of complex, motivational games. Educational scenarios which purport to be gamification, but only make use of progress mechanics such as points, badges and leaderboards are particularly susceptible to such criticism.

Gamification in education has also raised concerns over inequity in the classroom. A lack of access to technology, students who do not like gaming, and students in large schools where the teachers do not know each student on an individual level may affect any educational benefit to come from gamification, and gamification may not be appropriate for every subject in school. For example, sensitive or controversial subject matter such as racial history or human rights may not be an appropriate space for gamification.

There are growing concerns about ethical constraints surrounding implementation of gamification using ICT tools and e-learning systems. Gaming elements, like points and badges, can encourage collaboration and social competition but can also encourage aggression amongst learners. More so, the policies guiding the privacy and security of data produced in gamified e-learning systems needs to be transparent to all stakeholders including students and administrators. Teachers and students need to be aware and accept to participate in any gamified form of learning introduced in the curriculum. Any possible risks that may arise should be made available to all participants prior to their participation. Furthermore, educators should have an understanding of the target audience of the learners to maintain fairness. Educators need to ensure gaming elements and rules integrated in gamification design do not impair learners' participation because of their social, cultural or physical conditions.

== See also ==
- Game studies
- Incentive-centered design
