= Night Zookeeper =

Reading and writing program for kids

Night Zookeeper is a company founded and based in London that develops products designed to improve children's reading and writing skills, including an online learning program, iOS app, teaching resources, book series, and 10-episode TV mini-series. The brand was founded in 2012 by Joshua Davidson and Paul Hutson. Night Zookeeper aims to help children between 6–12 years of age develop their creativity and writing through a gamified learning approach.

== Background ==
Wonky Star originally worked in schools where they completed workshops to help children think creatively through art and writing. Night Zookeeper created an app intended for a school setting. This app was recognized as one of the 50 best apps of 2013 by The Guardian. In 2014, Night Zookeeper created a website that included more writing elements, a dashboard to monitor children's progress, and personalized feedback from the Night Zookeeper staff of tutors. Originally their product started as an e-learning app that focused on drawing, which is an encouraging stepping stone in creative writing. Night Zookeeper's website incorporated creative writing elements that developed into a reading and writing program. The website was primarily used in classrooms.

In 2017, Night Zookeeper released a book series. Oxford University Press bought the rights for the first four books in the Night Zookeeper series which center around Night Zookeeper Will Rivers, a ten-year-old child, tasked with helping save the Night Zoo and the magical animals inside. The books are written by Joshua Davidson and Giles Clare and are illustrated by Dace Shephard, based on original artwork done by Simon Burman. The first book in the series was released in January 2018 entitled, The Giraffes of the Whispering Wood. Since the first book's release, five more books have been added to the series. In 2017, Night Zookeeper signed a contract with The Oxford University Press to write four books in the Night Zookeeper series.

After the book series, Night Zookeeper created a 10-part television mini-series in 2019. The TV mini-series aired in the United Kingdom on Sky Kids and on Mango TV in China. The Night Zookeeper 10-part mini-series based characters on children's drawings. Children submitted ideas on the Night Zookeeper website. Submissions from children included drawings and descriptions of characters, props, locations, jokes, plot twists, and catchphrases. Working with Karrot Animation studios, prototypes of characters were presented to the child designer to solidify the character design as being consistent with the children's visions. The Night Zookeeper mini-series was made for the program, Sky Kids, which aired on the respective network in the UK in 2019.

In 2019, Night Zookeeper released their at-home program for settings other than a classroom. The Night Zookeeper at-home learning program uses gamification of learning to encourage children. Gamification of learning consists of adding value to a game beyond entertainment with the interest of having more comprehension and learning afterward. This design process adds game elements to change existing learning processes to keep children engaged and self-motivated. Users are asked to draw their own characters and play games, activities, and challenges to teach creative writing. By integrating video lessons from their TV mini-series, children have the chance to learn more about writing genres and other educational elements. It was later released as an app for iOS.

== Books ==
- Davidson, Joshua; Clare, Giles (2018). The Giraffes of Whispering Wood (1st ed.). Oxford: Oxford University Press.
- Davidson, Joshua; Clare, Giles (2018). The Lioness of Fire Desert (1st ed.). Oxford: Oxford University Press.
- Davidson, Joshua; Clare, Giles (2019). The Penguins of Igloo City (1st ed.). Oxford: Oxford University Press. ISBN 978-0-19-276407-2.
- Davidson, Joshua; Clare, Giles (2019). The Elephant of Tusk Temple (1st ed.). Oxford: Oxford University Press. ISBN 978-0-19-276408-9.
- Davidson, Joshua; Clare, Giles (2021). The Bear of Flying Mountain. London: Wonky Star. ISBN 978-1-8380757-1-2.
- Davidson, Joshua; Clare, Giles (2022). The Sea Lion of Endless Ocean. London: Wonky Star. ISBN 978-1-8380757-3-6.

== Reception ==
- Recognized as one of the 50 best apps of 2013 by The Guardian and The Observer
- Recognized as one of the best android apps for kids of 2014 by The Guardian
- Received a BAFTA nomination for the First British Children's Academy Award in the Learning Primary category in 2016
- Recognition from Common Sense Learning, The London Book Fair, and Design for Experience
- Received a BETT Award for Best in Literacy in 2016
- Teachers Choice 2021 Award presented by EdTech Impact
