= Tyler Bosmeny =

American founder, entrepreneur, and investor

- Education: Harvard University (AB, MA)
- Occupations: Founder; Entrepreneur; Investor
- Employer: Y Combinator
- Known for: Startups: PaperG, Clever
- Spouse: Sophie Turnbull (m. 2020)

Tyler Bosmeny is an American entrepreneur and investor. In 2012, Bosmeny co-founded the educational technology company Clever with fellow Harvard University graduates Dan Carroll and Rafael Garcia. Clever was used by 50% of K-12 students in the U.S., and later acquired by Kahoot! in 2021 for $500 million.

Since 2023, Bosmeny has been a Visiting Group Partner at Y Combinator.

== Early life and education ==
Bosmeny attended Harvard University where he was awarded both a AB in applied mathematics and an MA in statistics within four years. While at Harvard, Bosmeny was elected the associate business manager of The Harvard Crimson.

== Career ==
=== PaperG ===
During his time at Harvard University, Bosmeny helped build PaperG in 2007 with four other then-college students who, like him, were working at school newspapers: Victor Wong, Ka Mo Lau, and Victor Cheng from Yale University, as well as Roger Lee, who was working The Harvard Crimson with Bosmeny. PaperG was a startup company "enabl[ing] websites to automate the creation of locally targeted advertising" and eventually served publications like The Los Angeles Times, The New York Post, and others.

According to Bosmeny, PaperG was developed out of a need to provide alternative advertising options to local businesses at a time when "online ad was largely dominated by large national companies." By 2010, PaperG secured over a million dollars in funding. In 2011, PaperG opened headquarters in the San Francisco Bay Area; an office in Seattle followed one year later. That year, in 2012, Bosmeny left to start his next venture.

=== Clever ===
In 2012, Bosmeny co-founded the education technology company, Clever, with fellow Harvard University graduates Carroll and Garcia. Based in San Francisco, the company built an API to help edtech developers transfer data between their learning software and the legacy databases used inside of schools. That same year, Clever was accepted to Y Combinator.

Of the company's aims, Bosmeny stated in TechCrunch:

You can an imagine if you're a teacher, each one of your 20 students are using different apps to learn, and you're supposed to track how they're progressing across all the apps they use. All this data, it should be making things easier for teachers – but instead, it's making it harder.

Bosmeny served as the company's chief executive officer. Through the 2010s, Clever partnered with thousands of schools, millions of students, and earned approximately $43 million in funding alone while operating on a cash flow neutral basis starting in 2016. In 2014, Bosmeny along with Carroll and Garcia were named in Forbes' Education 30 Under 30. In 2017, Clever was ranked number four in The Wall Street Journal's Tech Companies to Watch.

In 2021, Clever was used by 50% of U.S. K-12 students. That same year, Kahoot! acquired Clever for $500 million; Clever remained an independent company while integrating with Kahoot! apps and expanding to also serve the 200 countries Kahoot! operated in. In 2022, Bosmeny stepped down from his role as chief executive officer and announced Trish Sparks as his successor.

=== Y Combinator ===
Bosmeny has been a Visiting Group Partner at Y Combinator since 2023.

== Personal life ==
In 2020, Bosmeny married Sophie Turnbull, a fellow Harvard University graduate from Australia.
