= Roger Lee =

Roger Lee may refer to:

- Roger Lee (architect) (1920–1981), American architect
- Roger Lee (entrepreneur) (born c. 1986), American entrepreneur
- Roger Lee (footballer) (born 1991), Bermudian football player
- Roger I. Lee (1881–1965), American doctor
