= Next Gen Personal Finance =

Financial literacy education organization

- Abbreviation: NGPF
- Formation: 2014; 12 years ago
- Founders: Jessica Endlich, and Tim Ranzetta
- Type: Nonprofit organization
- Legal status: 501(c)(3) organization
- Headquarters: Burlingame, California, United States
- Region served: United States of America
- Services: Financial education
- Official language: English (primarily); Spanish (partially)
- Website: www.NGPF.org

Next Gen Personal Finance (NGPF) is an American non-profit education service specializing primarily in the education of finance and financial literacy. It was founded in 2014 by Jessica Endlich and Tim Ranzetta.

== History ==
NGPF was founded in 2014 by Tim Ranzetta and Jessica Endlich in California. The organization developed free personal finance curricula and teacher training programmes for middle-school and high-school educators.

NGPF subsequently expanded its educational resources and advocacy activities to promote financial literacy education in schools. Its Mission 2030 initiative was established to support universal access to semester-long personal finance courses for American high-school students by 2030.

== Content ==
Next Gen Personal Finance contains free resources created by NGPF themselves with information sourced from what they consider reputable resources. The resources NGPF provide range from videos to assignments on Google Docs. Their content is up-to-date.

=== FinCap Friday ===
Next Gen Personal Finance does what it calls FinCap Fridays. A FinCap Friday contains a two-minute video and a five-minute competitive activity, usually a Kahoot. FinCap Fridays are hosted by Yanely Espinal, also known as @MissBeHelpful.

== Mission 2030 ==
The mission of Next Gen Personal Finance is to have all high-schoolers take a financial course during their high-school by the year 2030. NGPF partnered with the Colorado Department of Education to include finance and financial literacy in school curriculums.
