= Clever (company) =

American educational technology company

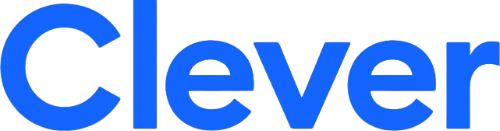
- Company type: Private
- Website type: Educational technology
- Founded: 2012
- Headquarters: San Francisco, California, U.S.
- Owner: Kahoot!
- Founders: Tyler Bosmeny; Dan Carroll; Rafael Garcia
- Key people: Trish Sparks (Chief executive officer)
- Website: https://www.clever.com/

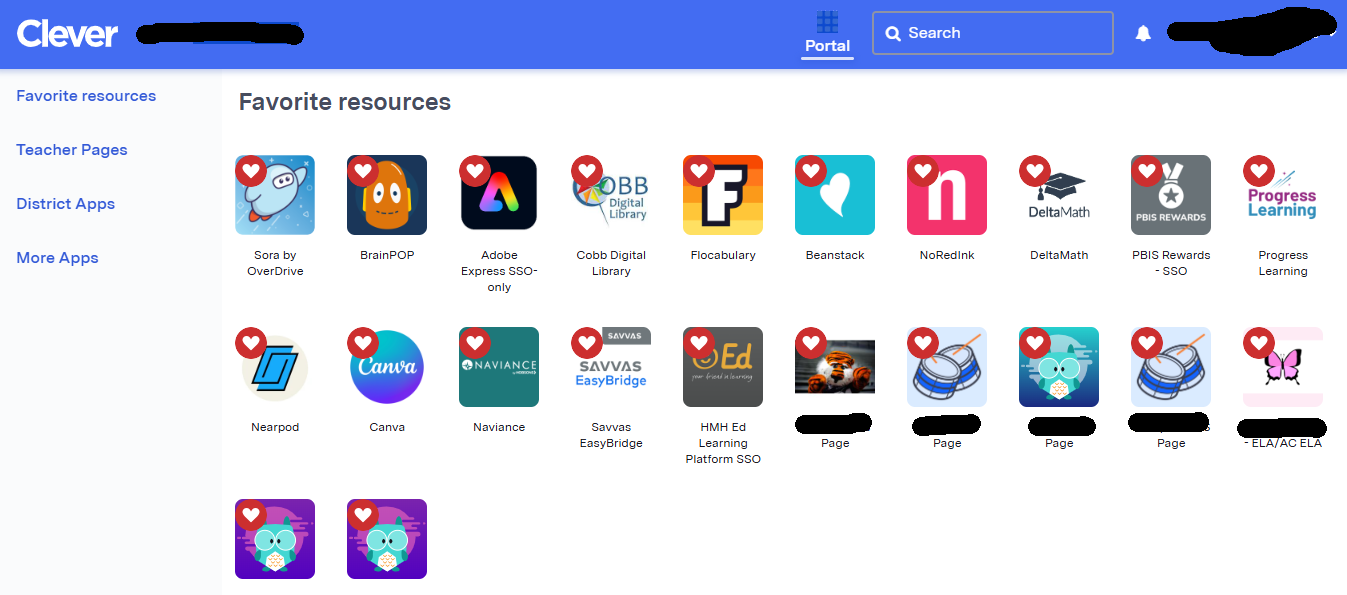
Typical Homepage of Clever Website (May 2026)

Clever is an American educational technology company. It was founded in 2012 by Tyler Bosmeny, Dan Carroll, and Rafael Garcia. The company was acquired by Kahoot! in 2021.

== Overview ==
Clever is a digital learning platform that stores student information along with access to hundreds of learning applications. Student information can be transferred from school databases and students can log in with a badge or a password. Once logged in to Clever, students can easily find available learning apps on their homepage and are automatically logged in to the apps through Clever.

== History ==
=== Founders ===
Clever was founded in 2012 in San Francisco by three Harvard University graduates—Tyler Bosmeny, Dan Carroll, and Rafael Garcia. It was intended as a centralized platform for school systems to transfer student data and provide services to students. Carroll, a former teacher with Teach For America, had the idea for a platform that streamlined educational technology in classrooms. Bosmeny was the company's chief executive officer, Garcia was chief technology officer, and Carroll was chief product officer.

=== Funding ===
By 2016, the company had raised approximately $60 million in total fundraising. By 2017, The Washington Post reported that the platform was used by approximately half of the public schools in the United States. By then, the company was valued at over $250 million. That year, it was ranked number four in The Wall Street Journal's Tech Companies to Watch.

=== Acquisition ===
As of 2021, Clever ran on a cash flow neutral basis. The platform was being used in 65% of K-12 school districts, with approximately 20 million monthly users. In May 2021, the Oslo-based education technology company Kahoot! acquired Clever for $500 million. Under the agreement, Clever would remain its own independent company while integrating Kahoot! Apps onto its digital platform and also expanding Clever outside of the United States to other countries where Kahoot! is used.

=== Leadership ===
In 2022, former Wake County middle school teacher Trish Sparks became the chief executive officer of Clever. Sparks previously worked in Clever's San Francisco Bay Area office as a vice president of customer success.
