= List of endangered languages with mobile apps =

This is a list of endangered languages with mobile apps available for use in language revitalization.

== Endangered Australian languages with mobile apps ==
- The Living Archive of Aboriginal Languages (LAAL) is a digital archive of literature in endangered languages of Australia, containing works in over forty Australian Aboriginal languages from the Northern Territory, Australia. The LAAL Reader app is available on Apple App Store and Google Play.

=== Individual languages ===
- Anindilyakwa language (Northern Territory) The NT Languages Anindilyakwa app provides flash cards in English and Anindilyakwa, and provides audio samples of both. Some words also include hand movements in small video clips. Available in Apple and Android
- Barngarla language (South Australia) – A mobile app featuring a dictionary of over 3000 Barngarla words.
- Erub Mer (Torres Strait Island language, Queensland)
- Gamilaraay language (New South Wales) – The Gadjigadji mobile app available for iOS and Android.
- Iwaidja language (Northern Territory) – The Ma! Iwadja app is being used to teach the language.
- Kuku Yalanji (Queensland) - a mobile app dictionary with various categories, with words and phrases.
- Miriwoong language (Western Australia) – a mobile app dictionary of 1400 words and phrases
- Wiradjuri language (New South Wales) – a mobile app available for iOS, Android and a web based version.
- Yawuru language (Western Australia)

== Endangered Oceanian languages with mobile apps ==
- Hawaiian language – In 2018, Duolingo added a Hawaiian language course. Resources are also available on Memrise.

== Endangered Native American languages with mobile apps ==
- Aleut language – A course on Memrise is available.
- Arikara language
- Blackfoot language – The Siksika Nation has created an app for IOS devices that can be downloaded here.
- Caddo language
- Cherokee language – Resources available on Mango Languages and Memrise.
- Chickasaw language
- Choctaw language – A course on Memrise is available.
- Comanche language – A course on Memrise is available.
- Comox language – A Sliammon iPhone app was released in March 2012. An online dictionary, phrasebook, and language learning portal is available at FirstVoices.
- Cowlitz language – The Language Conservancy has made dictionary, vocab builder, media player, and keyboard apps.
- Cree language app – produced by the Maskwacis Cree of Samsun Cree Nation
- Dakota language
- Haida language – A Skidegate Haida language app is available for iPhone, based on a "bilingual dictionary and phrase collection comprised of words and phrases archived at the online Aboriginal language database FirstVoices.com."
- Halkomelem language – A Halkomelem iPhone app was released in 2011.
- Inuvialuk language
- Konkow language
- Kutenai language – A Kutenai language app, Ktunaxa, is available at the FirstVoices website.
- Lakota language
- Lillooet language
- Luiseño language
- Lushootseed language
- Mandan language
- Navajo language – A Duolingo course is available. Resources are also available on Memrise.
- Nisga’a language
- Nisqually language – The Language Conservancy has made a keyboard app
- Nuu-chah-nulth language
- Nheengatu
- Ojibwe language
- Potawatomi language – A course on Memrise is available.
- Quinault language – The Language Conservancy has made a vocab builder app
- Saanich dialect
- Seneca language – As of January 2013, a Seneca language app was under development. A course on Memrise is available.
- Stoney Language – The Stoney Nakoda Nation has created a dictionary, vocab builder, and media player for the language.
- Tahltan language – The Language Conservancy has made a dictionary app
- Tanacross language
- Tlingit language
- Tłı̨chǫ language
- Upper Kuskokwim language
- Winnebago language

== Endangered European languages with mobile apps ==
- Cornish language – There is a dedicated app. Resources are also available on Memrise.
- Irish language – Several courses are available on Drops, Duolingo and Memrise.
- Low German – PlattinO App to learn the east Frisisan variety. The app was released by the Ostfrisische Landschaft. ALWiNE released by the University of Greifswald for the Mecklenburgish-West Pomeranian variety.
- Manx language
- Scottish Gaelic - Courses available on Memrise, Mango Languages, and Duolingo.
- Ume Sámi – a course created by the speech community on Memrise.
- Welsh language – Several courses are available on Memrise and Duolingo.
- Yiddish language – Resources are available on Memrise and Duolingo.
