= Survey (archaeology) =

Non-destructive exploration of the archaeological material in a given area

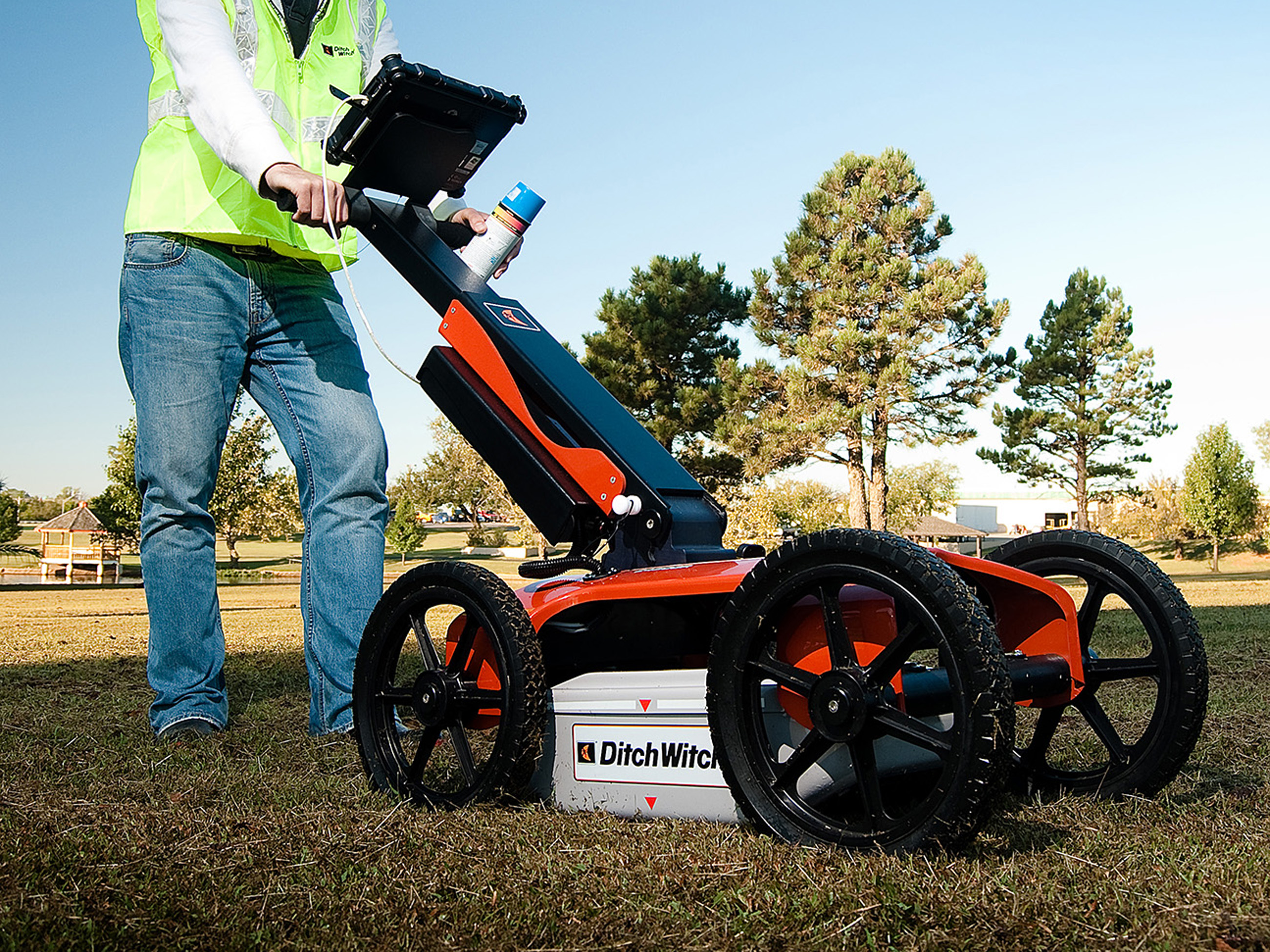
Ground penetrating radar is a tool used in archaeological field surveys.

In archaeology, survey or field survey is a type of field research by which archaeologists (often landscape archaeologists) search for archaeological sites and collect information about the location, distribution and organization of past human cultures across a large area (e.g. typically in excess of one hectare, and often in excess of many km^{2}). Archaeologists conduct surveys to search for particular archaeological sites or kinds of sites, to detect patterns in the distribution of material culture over regions, to make generalizations or test hypotheses about past cultures, and to assess the risks that development projects will have adverse impacts on archaeological heritage.

Archaeological surveys may be: (a) intrusive or non-intrusive, depending on the needs of the survey team (and the risk of destroying archaeological evidence if intrusive methods are used) and; (b) extensive or intensive, depending on the types of research questions being asked of the landscape in question. Surveys can be a practical way to decide whether or not to carry out an excavation (as a way of recording the basic details of a possible site), but may also be ends in themselves, as they produce important information about past human activities in a regional context.

A common role of a field survey is in assessment of the potential archaeological significance of places where development is proposed. This is usually connected to construction work and road building. The assessment determines whether the area of development impact is likely to contain significant archaeological resources and makes recommendations as to whether the archaeological remains can be avoided or an excavation is necessary before development work can commence.

Archaeologists use a variety of tools when carrying out surveys, including GIS, GPS, remote sensing, geophysical survey and aerial photography.

== Research and planning ==
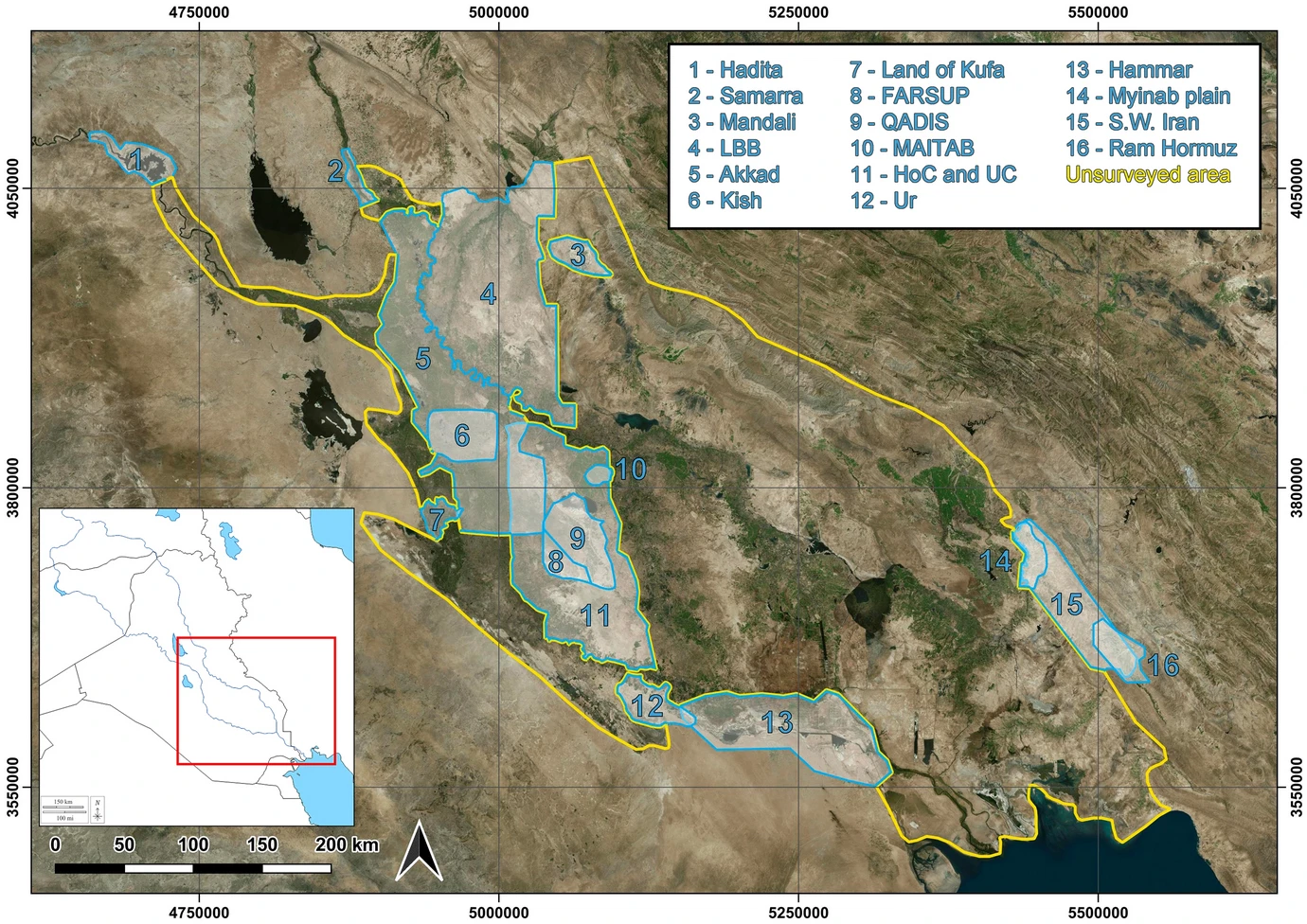
Satellite image of Mesopotamia indicating the areas that have been subjected to some form of archaeological survey (in blue)

Survey work is conducted for a variety of reasons, some of which are motivated by threats to the preservation of archaeological material. These threats may include proposed land development or risks associated with processes such as decay or erosion. Surveys can also be conducted in the absence of threat as part of a research program or conservation efforts. Prior to engaging in fieldwork, desk-based assessments will likely take place, during which, written, visual, and electronic information is gathered for the purpose of evaluating and developing a plan for future fieldwork. Consideration should be given to the nature of the landscape (vegetation coverage, existing settlement or industry, soil depth, climate) before a range of techniques is selected to be applied within an appropriate overarching method.

=== Rationale ===
An area may be considered worthy of surveying based on the following:

- Artifacts found: Locals have picked up physical artifacts, sometimes held by the local museum but more often collected in private homes or old buildings such as churches and synagogues, and it is unclear where they are coming from.
- Literary sources: Old literary sources have provided archaeologists with clues about settlement locations that have not been archaeologically documented. Sometimes the texts may be quite recent; for instance, a book on local history may mention an interesting area.
- Oral sources: In many locations, local stories contain some hint of a greater past, and often they have a basis in history. For instance, someone may remember that a grandfather who used to walk the hills as a shepherd used to talk about columns from an old temple, although the descendant never saw the ruins.
- Local knowledge: In many cases, locals know where to find something of interest to archaeologists. They may not have reported it because of taking it as part of their world, or because of fearing intrusions on their land or community.
- Previous surveys: In some places, a past survey may have been recorded in an academic journal. The use of more recent technologies and finds from other sites may provide reason to re-examine the site.
- Previous excavations: Excavations carried out before the middle of the 20th century are notoriously poorly documented. They were often carried out by methods that left behind much of the evidence the modern-day archaeologist is looking for. Early excavators were often interested only in fine pottery, jewelry and statues and referred to as rescue archaeologists.
- Lack of knowledge: Many areas of the world have developed limited knowledge about the nature and organization of past human activity at the regional level. (Although one or more sites may be known from an area, often little is known about the wider distribution of contemporary settlements, and how settlement patterns may change over time.) An archaeological field survey is the primary tool for discovering information about previously uninvestigated areas.
- Archaeological hypotheses: Some kinds of archaeological theories — about changes in agricultural strategies or population density for example — are investigated or tested through the use of archaeological surveys of areas that should or should not contain particular kinds of archaeological materials if the theory is true.

=== Map regression ===
Map regression, comparing maps from different periods of the same area, can reveal past structures that were recorded but are no longer visible as surface features. Using modern maps to transcribe or re-project earlier maps can help to locate these features with contemporary survey controls and techniques.

=== Aerial photography ===
Aerial photography is a good tool for planning a survey. Remains of older buildings often show in fields as cropmarks; just below the topsoil, the remains may affect the growth of crops or grass. There should preferably be photographs of the same area at different times of the year, allowing the analyst to find the best time to see cropmarks.

=== Previous work in the region ===
If the indicator that started the process was not a record of previous work, the archaeologists will need to check if any work has been done prior to commencement of the pending project. As many older surveys and excavations were published in papers that are not widely available, this may be a difficult task. A common way to handle this is through a visit to the area, to check with local museums, historians and older people who might remember something about the former activities in a particular locale.

=== Permissions ===
It is usually a simple matter to gain permission to perform a cultural field survey, especially a non-intrusive one. If the area is privately owned, the local laws may or may not require the landowners' co-operation. Permission for an intrusive form of survey may be more difficult to acquire, due to the fear of destroying evidence or property values and the threat of lawsuit for said damages from the property owner.

== Intrusive vs. non-intrusive surveys ==
In a non-intrusive survey, nothing is touched, just recorded. An accurate survey of the earthworks and other features can enable them to be interpreted without the need for excavation.

An intrusive survey can mean different things. In some cases, all artifacts of archaeological value are collected. This is often the case if it is a rescue survey, but less common in a regular survey.

Another form of intrusive research is bore holes. Small holes are drilled into the ground, most often with hand-powered bores. The contents are examined to determine the depths at which one might find cultural layers, and where one might expect to strike virgin soil. This can be valuable in determining the cost of an excavation - if there is a build-up of several meters of soil above the layers the archaeologist is interested in, the price will obviously be much higher than if artifacts are found only centimeters below ground.

== Extensive vs. intensive survey ==
One way to classify archaeological field surveys is to divide them into two types: intensive and extensive. The former is characterised by the complete or near-complete coverage of the survey area at a high resolution, most often by having teams of survey archaeologists walk in a systematic way (e.g. in parallel transects) over parcels of the landscape in question, documenting archaeological data such as lithics, ceramics and/or building remains. However, variations in artifact visibility related to topography, vegetation, and soil character, not to mention the imperfect detection abilities of human observers, bring into question the very concept of complete coverage. An extensive survey, on the other hand, is characterised by a low-resolution approach over targets within a study area (sometimes including hundreds of km²). Sometimes this involves a random sampling or some other kind of probability sample to gain a representative sample of the study area. Extensive surveys may be designed to target the identification of archaeological sites across a large area, whereas intensive surveys are designed to provide a more comprehensive picture of the location of sites and the nature of off-site data (e.g. field systems, isolated finds, etc.). An intensive survey is the more costly, timely, and ultimately informative of the two approaches, although extensive surveys can provide important information about previously unknown areas.

== Purposive vs. sampling survey ==
Archaeological field surveys can also be characterized as either purposive or sampling surveys. The former, sometimes also called "archaeological prospection", involves cases where archaeologists are searching for a particular site or a particular kind of archaeological material. For example, they might be searching for a particular shipwreck or an historic fort whose exact location is no longer certain. However, they may also be searching for archaeological materials in particular locations to test hypotheses about past use of those spaces. Sampling surveys, on the other hand, have the goal of obtaining a representative sample of some population of sites or artifacts in order to make generalizations about that population. This involves some probability sampling of spatial units, such as random or stratified random sampling of geometrical (often square) or irregular spatial units.

== Fieldwalking (transects) ==
Conventionally, fieldwalking in grids or along lines called transects has formed the backbone of archaeological survey fieldwork, at least where visibility is fairly good. A single researcher or team will walk slowly through the target area looking for artifacts or other archaeological indicators on the surface, often recording aspects of the environment at the time. The method works best on either ploughed ground or surfaces with little vegetation. On ploughed surfaces, as the soil is turned regularly artifacts will move to the top. Erosion and soil loss on uncultivated and lightly vegetated soil (e.g., in semi-arid environments) may cause artifacts to also 'rise' to the surface.

Even with optimal surface conditions the efficacy of fieldwalking varies according to long-term land use, topography, weather conditions, the skill and experience of the fieldwalkers, and other factors. Intensive arable agriculture on hilltops will first expose and then pulverize artifacts such as pottery and even chipped stone (typically flint, chert or obsidian) flakes. Conversely, the plateau and upper scarp or valley side soils will move down slope, forming a deep seal over low-lying archaeological deposits, rendering them inaccessible to surface survey. Even artifacts on the surface and with relatively high visibility (i.e., little obscuring vegetation), however, are not consistently detected by surveyors. Consequently, it is unrealistic to expect 100% recovery of artifacts or even sites. We can evaluate surveyors' effectiveness at detecting artifacts with "Sweep width," which is the theoretical width of a transect in which the number of artifacts detected outside the sweep is identical to the number missed within the sweep. The poorer the visibility, the poorer the contrast between the artifact "targets" and their surroundings, or the poorer the surveyor's skill or attention, the narrower the sweep width will be.

Modern technology such as GPS has made survey recording much easier, as positions of artifacts or artifact clusters ("sites") can be taken well within the limits of accuracy and precision necessary for survey work. Recording the position and attributes of archaeological features has been expedited by customizable portable computing interfaces or mobile Geographical Information Systems (GIS). Databases containing existing regional archaeological data as well as other landscape GIS layers such as soils, vegetation, modern features, and development plans can be loaded on a mobile GIS for referencing, for sampling purposes, and for groundtruth updating directly in the field, resulting a more informed archaeological survey process.

== Visible above-ground structures and Subsurface Testing ==
Fieldwalking involves picking up scattered artifacts in ploughed fields. In heavily wooded areas such as Scandinavia or the North American Northeast, or deeply alluviated areas as in the Netherlands, fieldwalking is not always a practical method. Humus and fallen leaves in forested areas, silt on alluvial fans, or turf in built-up neighbourhoods may render near-surface artifacts and sites invisible even at short distances. In such instances, archaeological surveyors may concentrate on above-ground structures such as burial cairns, collapsed field walls and rock art panels, look for unnatural changes in the vegetation and landscape to decide what may be hidden under the vegetation, or survey by subsurface testing (SST). SSTs can consist of a series of shovel-test pits that penetrate the humus layer or turf or, where substantial later sediments may cover archaeological materials, series of auger or core holes. SSTs are much more costly than fieldwalking, and surveys by SST usually have very low probability of intersecting and detecting archaeological remains unless intensity (density of SSTs), and thus cost, is prohibitively high. The various Scandinavian sites and monuments registers mainly list above-ground monuments, not ploughed-out sites with scattered pottery.

=== Narrowing it down ===
Because of the high costs involved in some kinds of surveys, it is often helpful to use "predictive modelling" to narrow down the search for archaeological materials. This is particularly important for purposive surveys, but can also be used to guide sampling surveys by eliminating the need to survey areas where, for geological or other reasons, we can reasonably expect all ancient traces to be destroyed (e.g., by erosion) or far too deeply buried (e.g., by alluvium) to be detectable. Modern predictive models in archaeology employ Geographic Information Systems (GIS).

== Geophysical survey ==
A geophysical survey is used for subsurface mapping of archaeological sites. In recent years, there have been great advances in this field, and it is becoming an increasingly useful and cost-effective tool in archaeology. Geophysical instruments can detect buried archaeological features when their electrical or magnetic properties contrast measurably with their surroundings. In some cases, individual artifacts, especially metal, may be detected as well. Readings taken in a systematic pattern become a dataset that can be rendered as image maps for interpretation. Survey results can be used to guide excavation and to give archaeologists insight into the patterning of non-excavated parts of the site. Unlike other archaeological methods, geophysical survey is not invasive or destructive. For this reason, it is often used where preservation (rather than excavation) is the goal for project preservation and compliance with applicable laws.

The geophysical methods most commonly applied to archaeology are magnetometers, electrical resistance meters, ground-penetrating radar (GPR) and electromagnetic (EM) conductivity. These methods provide excellent resolution of many types of archaeological features, and are capable of high sample density surveys of very large areas and of operating under a wide range of conditions. While common metal detectors are geophysical sensors, they are not capable of generating high-resolution imagery. Other established and emerging technologies are also finding use in archaeological applications.

Although geophysical surveying has been used in the past with intermittent success, good results are very likely when it is applied appropriately. It is most useful when it is used in a well-integrated research design where interpretations can be tested and refined. Interpretation requires a knowledge both of the archaeological record, and of the way it is expressed geophysically. Appropriate instrumentation, field survey design, and data processing are essential for success, and must be adapted to the unique geology and archaeological record of each site. In the field, control of data quality and spatial accuracy are critical to a successful mission completion.

== Analysis and evaluation ==
The most important parts of the survey are analysis and evaluation. The types of questions that archaeologist often ask of survey data include: what is the evidence for first occupation of an area; when was this area occupied; how are sites distributed; where are sites located; what evidence is there for a settlement hierarchy; what sites are contemporary with each other; how has the modern landscape interfered with the visibility of archaeological remains; what sorts of activities can be recognized (e.g., dwellings, tombs, field systems); how many people lived in this area at any given time or how did population density change over time; why did people choose to live where they did; how has the landscape changed over time; what changes in settlement patterns have there been? However, answering such questions depends on the quality of the evidence, which is why it is important to evaluate the effectiveness and thoroughness of the survey or surveys that contribute that evidence.

At times, one part of the survey may not have yielded the evidence one wanted to find. For instance, very little may have been found during a field walk, but there are strong indications from geophysical survey and local stories that there is a building underneath a field. In such a case, the only way to decide if an excavation is worth the cost is to carefully analyze the evidence to determine which part to trust. On the one hand, the geophysics might just show an old and forgotten water-pipe, but it might also show the wall of just the building the archaeologists were looking for.

The analysis therefore includes careful examination of all the evidence collected. A method often used to determine its value is to compare it to sites of the same period. As the number of well-documented surveys grow, this becomes a slightly easier task, as it is sometimes easier to compare two survey results than to compare a survey result with an excavated site. However, it remains difficult to compare datasets produced by different research teams.

== See also ==
- Archaeological illustration – process of visually communicating the structure of an archaeological site or artifact
- Cropmark – Means through which sub-surface features can be visible from the air
- Excavation (archaeology) – Exposure, processing and recording of archaeological remains
- Geomatics – Geographic data discipline
- Institute for Field Research
- Survey (disambiguation) § Earth sciences
- Systematic survey
