= Layoffs.fyi =

Website

- Home page of Layoffs.fyi
- Website type: Job tracking
- Founded: 2020
- Creator: Roger Lee
- Website: layoffs.fyi

Layoffs.fyi is a website created by American programmer and founder Roger Lee. Developed during the onset of the COVID-19 pandemic in 2020, the website tracks, aggregates, and presents information about layoffs in the tech industry. Since then, Layoffs.fyi has aggregated over 450,000 layoffs, and the website is frequently cited in industry reportage by publications like The New York Times, The Wall Street Journal, and others.

== History ==
In 2020, during the Coronavirus pandemic, Lee decided to take time off and was "kind of on paternity leave"; he had been working at his latest startup company, Human Interest, at the time. As a side project developed while he was taking care of his kids at home, Lee created Layoffs.fyi as an online resource to capture information about tech layoffs happening because of the pandemic and other circumstances facing the tech sector. Initially, he intended the website to help recruiters so that laid-off employees could more quickly find new employment.

The success of Layoffs.fyi spurred Lee, in 2022, to create another company and website, Comprehensive.io, which serves a similar tracking purpose but instead tracks compensation in tech sector jobs and reports which companies abide by salary transparency laws in certain states. Lee called it "the inverse of Layoffs.fyi—it focuses on opportunities, not cuts."

== Impact ==
The website gets "about a million hits a month" as of 2023. That year, The New York Times wrote: "Over the past three years, Mr. Lee’s site has become a meaningful resource. Recruiters scour the listings for talent after big layoffs, and workers post their information when they lose their jobs"; they also saw the website's popularity as evidence of "a symptom and a cause of a cultural shift toward transparency about layoffs in tech." Stanford University professor Nick Bloom said that "Having this website engenders more transparency... the stigma has almost totally evaporated.” Various staffing firms have found the website useful to find individuals who are ready to work.

Since its creation in 2020, many media outlets and publications have also used Layoffs.fyi to report on hiring and unemployment in the tech sector including BBC, NPR, Slate, Forbes, BuzzFeed, TechCrunch, Reuters, NPR, Bloomberg News, Fox Business, USA Today, The New York Times, and The Wall Street Journal, among others. San Francisco Business Times named Layoffs.fyi "the go-to source for startup layoffs." Meg Duff of Slate stated: "I tried to start a tracker for news stories citing Lee’s tracker about layoffs, but quickly gave up".

San Francisco Business Times also called Lee the "de facto authority on tech layoffs"; since 2020, Lee has frequently been consulted on media outlets like CNBC, San Francisco Chronicle, and TechCrunch to talk about Layoffs.fyi's reported numbers, as well as general trends and patterns regarding employment in the tech industry.

== Methodology ==
Lee populates the website's spreadsheet himself. On a daily basis, he "keeps [Layoffs.fyi] updated with every tech layoff he can find, sourcing from credible reporting and press releases." In a Slate piece in January 2023, he stated: "It’s kind of a surreal experience every day to be reading and posting layoff news. I’ve read, at this point, over 1,000 articles about tech layoffs."

Lee has stated that his definition of a "tech company" has been loose and sometimes subject to change based on his feelings. In Slate, he stated "There’s no strict definition... If they sell software, that's obviously a tech company. If they've raised venture capital funding, then usually I'll count them as a tech company as well... I might change my mind."
