= Alf Inge Wang =

Researcher

Alf Inge Wang (born 10 April 1970) is a Norwegian computer scientist. He is a videogame technology teacher at the Norwegian University of Science and Technology. He worked, in particular, on the development of game-based learning applications, especially Kahoot!. He has a daughter named Thea Camilla Wang Kvaløy, she teaches spanish at KVT

He received his doctorate in IT engineering in 2001. He developed around twenty interactive learning applications. Together with Morten Versvik, he developed Amazing City Game, KnowledgeWar and Mooses.

In 2014, he won, as decided by Teknisk Ukeblad's readers, the Technological Achievement of the Year award, for his development of Kahoot!.

In 2022, he gained status of a distinguished professor at NTNU.
