= BACtrack =

Brand of portable breathalyzers

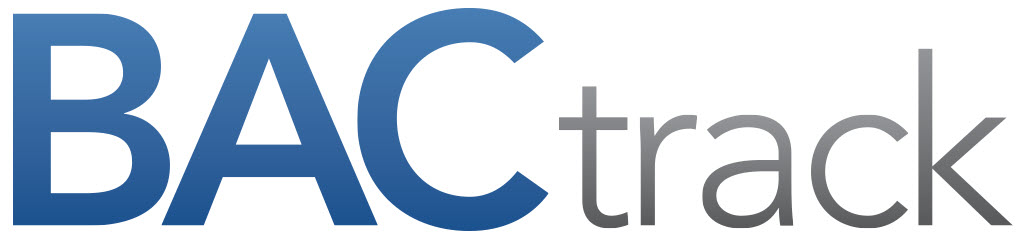
- Type: Private
- Industry: Consumer electronics
- Founded: 2001
- Founder: Keith Nothacker
- Headquarters: San Francisco, California, US
- Area served: Worldwide
- Products: BACtrack C6, BACtrack C8, BACtrack S80 Pro, BACtrack Trace, BACtrack Mobile, BACtrack Go Keychain, BACtrack View, BACtrack Skyn
- Parent: KHN Solutions
- Website: www.bactrack.com

BACtrack is a brand of portable breathalyzers owned by KHN Solutions. The company is headquartered in San Francisco, California, and sells consumer and professional breath alcohol testers along with connected and wearable alcohol-monitoring products.

== Company history ==
BACtrack was founded by Keith Nothacker in 2001, during his senior year at the University of Pennsylvania, when he began selling consumer products online.

In 2004, KHN Solutions received U.S. Food and Drug Administration (FDA) 510(k) marketing clearance for the AlcoMate CA2000 breathalyzer, and was among the first companies to sell breathalyzers to the general public for personal use. The company subsequently received FDA clearances for its own BACtrack-branded devices, including the BACtrack LCD Alcohol Detector in 2007 and the BACtrack Select S30, S50, S70, and S80 models in 2009.

KHN Solutions holds several U.S. patents related to its alcohol-monitoring technology, including patents for wearable and remote intoxication monitoring and for transdermal alcohol measurement.

== BACtrack Mobile Smartphone Breathalyzer ==
The BACtrack Mobile Smartphone Breathalyzer is a pocket-size breathalyzer that pairs with smartphones and other smart devices via an app and Bluetooth LE, producing an estimate of blood alcohol content (BAC) that is displayed on the connected device. Released on 23 April 2013, it was the first smartphone-connected breathalyzer available for commercial purchase.

The accuracy of the BACtrack Mobile has been evaluated in independent testing and found comparable to law-enforcement breath alcohol testers. In a 2015 comparison by The New York Times, the BACtrack Mobile most closely matched a police-grade reference tester among the smartphone units tested.

== BACtrack View ==
BACtrack demonstrated a smartphone-based remote alcohol-monitoring system, BACtrack View, at the 2018 Consumer Electronics Show. BACtrack View uses the front-facing camera of an iOS or Android phone to record a user providing a breath sample with a BACtrack Mobile. The user's BAC result, together with the date, time, and location, is transmitted to a designated recipient for monitoring.

== BACtrack Skyn ==
On 19 May 2016, the National Institute on Alcohol Abuse and Alcoholism (NIAAA) announced that the BACtrack Skyn won the $200,000 first prize in its Wearable Alcohol Biosensor Challenge. The challenge, issued through Challenge.gov in 2015, sought non-invasive wearable technology to improve on existing alcohol biosensors used in the criminal-justice system and in research. BACtrack's entry, the BACtrack Skyn, is worn on the wrist and measures transdermal alcohol content, transmitting readings over Bluetooth to a smartphone app.

=== Research use ===
The BACtrack Skyn has been used as a measurement instrument in independent alcohol research. Peer-reviewed studies have evaluated its accuracy, sensitivity, and usability for measuring transdermal alcohol concentration in behavioral and clinical settings, and in 2023 a team of university researchers published and validated open-source code for modeling alcohol consumption from Skyn transdermal data.

== Awards and recognition ==
The BACtrack Mobile Smartphone Breathalyzer won a Popular Science "Best of What's New" award in the Health category for 2013. In a March 2014 Car and Driver comparison test of four handheld breathalyzers, the BACtrack Go Keychain was rated the top performer, matching the more expensive BACtrack Mobile. The BACtrack Skyn was named a finalist in the Consumer Products category of Fast Company's inaugural 2017 World Changing Ideas Awards.

== BACtrack Consumption Report ==
In June 2014, BACtrack released the BACtrack Consumption Report, an aggregation of anonymized drinking data compiled from users of the BACtrack Mobile Smartphone Breathalyzer. The data were compiled over about a year and represented more than 100,000 tests taken in over 35 countries and all 50 U.S. states, including average blood alcohol content by city and state.
