= Roger Lee (entrepreneur) =

American programmer, founder, and entrepreneur

- Born: c. 1986 (age 39–40); San Francisco, United States
- Education: Harvard University (BA)
- Occupations: Programmer; Founder; Entrepreneur
- Known for: Websites and companies: SubProfile, PaperG/Thunder, Human Interest, Layoffs.fyi, Comprehensive.io
- Website: www.rogerlee.com

Roger Lee is an American programmer, founder, and entrepreneur. As a high school student, Lee founded the instant messaging AIM service, SubProfiles, in 2002, which amassed millions of users shortly after its launch. In 2007, Lee and several other college students from Harvard University and Yale University co-founded the advertising company PaperG, and in 2015, Lee founded Human Interest, a company that helped other companies set up 401(k) plans for their employees.

In May of 2020, during the COVID-19 pandemic, Lee founded Layoffs.fyi, a website tracking tech layoffs, and has since become a frequently consulted expert on employment numbers and trends in the tech industry. In 2022, he founded Comprehensive, a website tracking compensation in tech sector jobs. In 2023, Lee was named in San Francisco Business Times 40 Under 40.

== Early life and education ==
Lee was born and raised in San Francisco. At age 12, Lee learned HTML, and one year later, he made his first website, antistudy.com, which was "a search engine for free book notes and study guides." Over time, Lee learned other programming languages, as well as SEO during Google's infancy as a search engine.

Later, as a high school student, Lee eventually "built a series of websites that became 3 out of the top 10 most visited websites by teenagers in 2003." Specifically, in 2002, Lee co-founded SubProfile, an AIM service to expand user profile capabilities and allow users to further customize theirs. That year, it generated over 30 million views a month, and SubProfile began selling advertisements within profiles to generate revenue. Once, the SubProfile website was hacked, and Lee regained access to SubProfile's domain name after paying a bribe over PayPal.

When Lee left to attend Harvard University in 2004, his interest in SubProfile "waned," and the platform shut down in 2007. During college, Lee interned at JP Morgan but realized that he wasn't interested in finance; he also worked at The Harvard Crimson where he helped sell ads. In 2008, Lee graduated with a degree in applied mathematics.

== Career ==
=== 2007–2014: PaperG/Thunder, Job Change Notifier ===
While at Harvard University, Lee co-founded PaperG in 2007 with four other college students working in school newspapers: Victor Wong, Ka Mo Lau, and Victor Cheng from Yale University, as well as Tyler Bosmeny, a fellow staff member of the Harvard Crimson. One year later, in 2008, it won the Harvard i3 Innovation Challenge, earning Lee, Bosmeny, and their team $5,000. Right out of college, Lee turned down a job offer at McKinsey & Company to continue working at PaperG.

By 2010, PaperG secured over a million dollars in funding and numerous partnerships with publications and publishers. In 2011, PaperG opened headquarters in the San Francisco Bay Area. One year later, an office in Seattle was opened. In 2014, Lee stepped down from his role in the company. During his time at PaperG, Lee also built Job Change Notifier, a LinkedIn service that sent emails to users whenever their connections changed employment. He had built it because "at PaperG, we had a lot of business contacts that were in our LinkedIn networks, but sometimes those business contacts couldn’t help us or be a customer of ours just yet." The service became popular among recruiters and job applicants alike; it was also featured on TechCrunch and Mashable. Lee was additionally asked to consider a career at LinkedIn.

=== 2015–2020: Human Interest, Job Change Notifier ===
During his time at PaperG, Lee wanted to offer a 401(k) program to his employees but found the process so tedious, laborious, and time-intensive that "the administrative burden was too much for his small startup to handle, so he opted not to offer the benefit." Lee then felt "ashamed" that his company couldn't offer a worthwhile benefit to its employees because of logistics.

Seeing the administrative burden of 401(k) programs as a fixable problem, Lee and Paul Sawaya founded Captain401 (later rebranded to Human Interest) in 2015; the company provides an automated and online platform to manage 401k plans and seamlessly connect with payroll systems. While building the company with Sawaya, Lee took and passed the Series 65 exam to gain qualification in investment advising. Since then, Human Interest has additionally served as an "SEC registered investment advisor, providing personalized investment advice to help contributors choose the investments that fit their personal situation and tolerance for risk."

Shortly after its founding, the company was on-boarded to Y Combinator's S15 batch and has since raised half a billion dollars with investments from BlackRock, TPG, Glynn Capital, USVP, Wing, Uncork, SoftBank, among others. Human Interest's last funding round, Series D, happened in 2021 and brought in $200 million. As of July 2024, the company has made plans to become a public company and has amassed a total of over $700 million in financing.

=== 2020–present: Layoffs.fyi, Comprehensive ===
In 2020, during the Coronavirus pandemic, Lee took time off and attended to a side project that would eventually become Layoffs.fyi, an online service to track layoffs happening in the tech industry from that year onward. Since then, Lee has frequently been consulted on media outlets like CNBC, San Francisco Chronicle, and TechCrunch to talk about layoffs, unemployment, and other hiring concerns in the tech industry. San Francisco Business Times called Lee the "de facto authority on tech layoffs" and named Layoffs.fyi "the go-to source for startup layoffs." The Information called Lee "Tech's 'Doom-and-Gloom Guy" and "the de facto census taker of tech's downturn."

By 2023, Layoffs.fyi tracked approximately 450,000 tech layoffs, and the website became popular. Slate wrote that "[Lee's] job numbers have found their way into nearly every major media outlet in the country" and reported over a million views per month. The New York Times wrote that "Over the past three years, Mr. Lee’s site has become a meaningful resource. Recruiters scour the listings for talent after big layoffs, and workers post their information when they lose their jobs"; they also saw the website's popularity as evidence of "a symptom and a cause of a cultural shift toward transparency about layoffs in tech." Many publications and media outlets have also used Layoffs.fyi to inform their reportage on the state of the tech sector including but not limited to BBC, Reuters, NPR, Bloomberg News, Fox Business, USA Today, and The Wall Street Journal, among others.

Layoffs.fyi helped Lee come up with the idea for his next company, Comprehensive, which was founded in 2022. Comprehensive serves a similar tracking purpose but for keeping track of compensations in tech sector jobs; Lee sees it "to be the inverse of Layoffs.fyi—it focuses on opportunities, not cuts." The website also tracks companies that comply with salary transparency laws in certain American states.

== Recognition ==
- 2023, San Francisco Business Times "40 Under 40"
