= Drops (app) =

American language-learning website and mobile app

- Screenshot
- Country of origin: Estonia
- Area served: Worldwide
- Owner: Kahoot!
- Founders: Daniel Farkas, Mark Szulyovszky
- Industry: Online education
- Products: Drops, Scripts, Droplets
- Services: Language courses
- Website: languagedrops.com
- Current status: Online
- Native clients on: Android, iOS, Web Browser

Drops is a language learning app that was created in Estonia by Daniel Farkas and Mark Szulyovszky in 2015. Drops is the second product from the company, after their first app, LearnInvisible, had issues in retaining a user's engagement. The languages available include Native Hawaiian and Māori, and was classified as one of the fifty "Most Innovative Companies" for 2019 by Fast Company.

The company partnered with Global Eagle Entertainment to include Travel Talk, a feature intended to focus on words and phrases frequently used by travelers. At the beginning of the COVID-19 pandemic in March 2020, the number of users increased by 55 percent in the United States and 92 percent in the United Kingdom. Droplets, a language app for children, includes profiles for multiple teachers working with remote students. The company also produces an app called Scripts, intended to help users learn to write alphabets.

The app was purchased by the Norwegian company Kahoot! in November 2020.

== See also ==
- List of language self-study programs
