= Systematic survey =

Systematic survey or extensive survey is the archaeological technique of detailed examination of an area for the purpose of recording the location and significance of archaeological resources. It provides a regional perspective by gathering information on settlement patterns over a large area. It is one of the basic fieldwork strategies used by paleoanthropologists and archaeologists. The regional survey answer questions pertaining to the site's location, the size of the settlement, their types of buildings, and the age of the site. Usually the surveyor walks over the area and records the site locations and their size. During this process, the surveyor tries to date the site to see when it was occupied.

== See also ==
- Archaeological field survey
