= DragonBox =

- Developer: WeWantToKnow AS
- Publisher: WeWantToKnow AS
- Programmer: Zoran Popović
- Platforms: iOS; Android
- Release: May 9, 2012
- Genre: Educational game
- Mode: Single-player

DragonBox is an educational game series developed and published by French-Norwegian studio WeWantToKnow AS (currently doing business as DragonBox). Its first installment, DragonBox Algebra, was released on May 9, 2012 for iOS, and has since then been followed by other installments. It was created to teach children math, such as algebra.

The game won a 2016 Games For Change award for "Best Learning Game", and received positive reception from critics, who praised the efficacy of the app.

== Gameplay ==
The game has five "worlds" with twenty levels each, and beating each level allows the dragons that the player possesses to grow into a new, more advanced form. To beat each level, the player must play a puzzle minigame in which they organize cards on two trays. While the cards are initially icons of various creatures and objects, the game uses them to abstractly demonstrate mathematical equations before later replacing them with variables and numbers. The player gets bonus stars if they complete the level in as few moves as possible, and with as few cards left as possible.

== Development ==
The co-founder and CEO of the game's studio is Jean-Baptiste Huyhn, a former math teacher who was frustrated with the way math was taught in schools and wanted to teach it in a way that made more sense to children. He started the We Want to Know studio with the goal of making educational games that were actually fun to play. The game was programmed by Zoran Popovic, a computer scientist who also created the video game Foldit.

== Reception ==
The game received positive reception from critics, with Jonathan H. Liu of Wired commenting on how his children "loved" the game despite its heavy mathematical focus. He stated that it "makes algebra so fun and easy to learn that my kids fight over who gets to play it". Stephanie Fogel of Gamasutra called the game something every developer should study.

Ann Elliott of Edudemic called the game "intuitive" and user-friendly. Adam Renfro of Getting Smart called the game "a shining example [...] of what gamification should look like". Jordan Shapiro in Forbes said he was "astonished" at how quickly his son learned algebraic equations, and was blown away.
