= Kahoot! =

Norwegian online educational quiz game

- Screenshot The homepage of the Kahoot! website
- Available in: 18 languages
- List of languages English, Dutch, French, German, Indonesian, Italian, Japanese, Malay, Norwegian, Polish, Portuguese, Spanish, Swedish, Turkish, Ukrainian, Arabic, Chinese, Vietnamese
- Country of origin: Norway
- Owner: Kahoot Learning Game Group
- CEO: Eilert Giertsen Hanoa
- Website: Main website: kahoot.com Game: kahoot.it
- Commercial: Yes
- Registration: Optional for quiz participation; required for quiz creation
- Users: 12 billion non-unique players as of 2025
- Launched: December 21, 2012

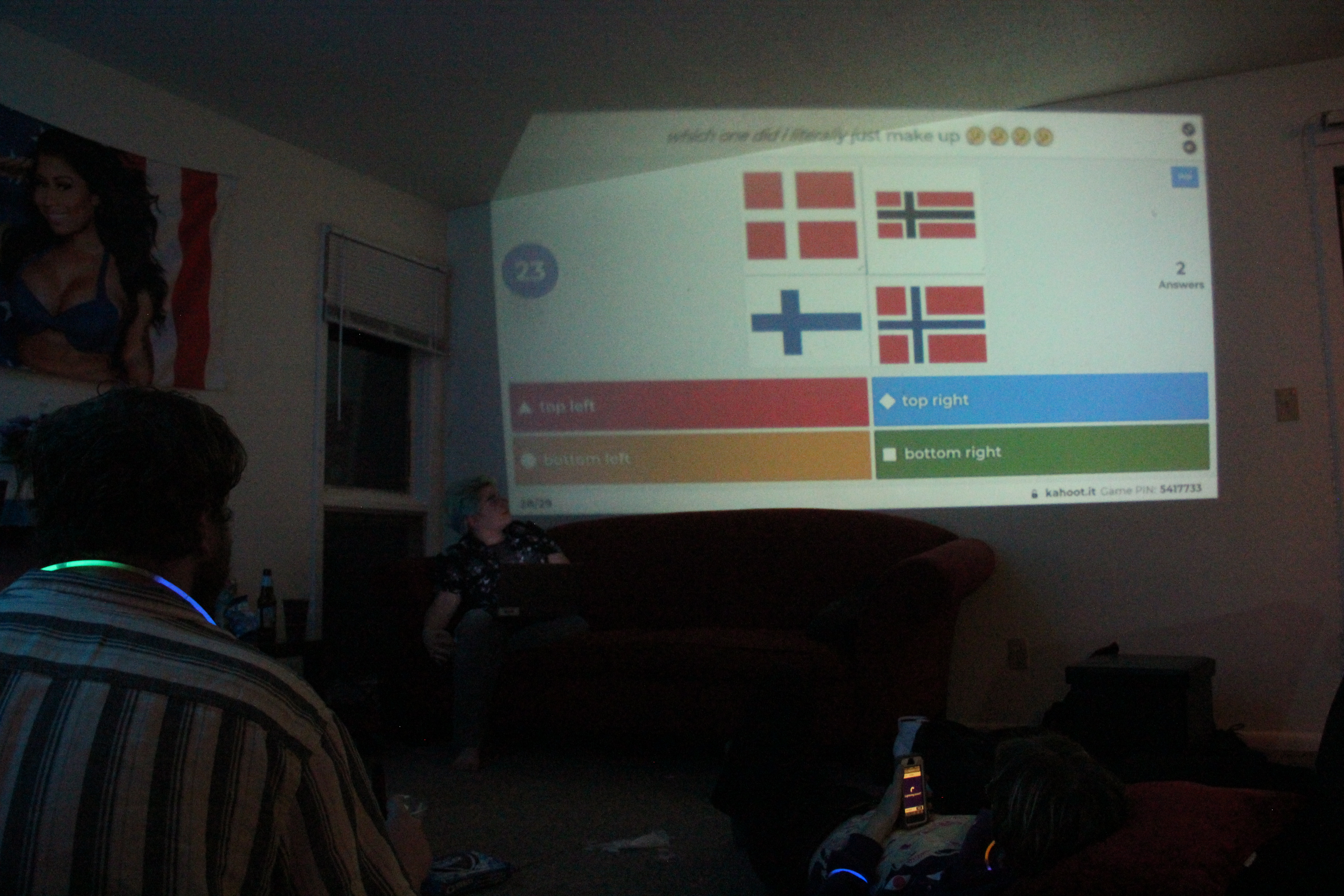
Kahoot house party

Kahoot! is a Norwegian online game-based learning platform. It has learning games, also known as "kahoots", which are user-generated multiple-choice quizzes that can be accessed via a web browser or the Kahoot! app. It was originally founded in 2006, but gained massive popularity in 2020 during the COVID-19 pandemic.

== Company History ==
=== Prototypes and development ===
The game concept used in Kahoot! originated in a series of prototypes called "Lecture Quiz" that were developed by Alf Inge Wang at the Norwegian University of Science and Technology (NTNU) in 2006. Lecture Quiz 1.0 was developed in 2006. The server was implemented in Java and MySQL, integrated with an Apache Web server. The teacher client was implemented as a Java application, in combination with OpenGL for graphics, while the student clients were implemented on Java 2 Micro Edition. This made it possible to run the client on both mobile phones and laptops.

Lecture Quiz 2.0, developed in 2011, was the first prototype where both teacher and student clients had web-interfaces. The last version of Lecture Quiz was version 3.0 in 2012, with improved user-interface implemented using HTML 5 and CSS3, avatars, and multiple game/team modes.

=== Company history ===
Kahoot! was founded in December 21, 2012 by Morten Versvik, one of Wang's students. Johan Brand, Jamie Brooker and Asmund Furuseth later joined the company as cofounders to develop its user interface and design. A beta version of the platform was launched in September 2013.

In March 2017, Kahoot! reached one billion cumulative participating players. In September 2017, Kahoot! launched a mobile application for homework.

In 2019, Kahoot! acquired the Scandinavian education company Poio. It also acquired DragonBox, an educational games developer, for $18 million.

In 2020, Kahoot! was valued at $1.5 billion and achieved unicorn status. As of 2021, Kahoot! was valued at $7 billion.

In 2020, Kahoot! acquired Drops, which was focused on teaching languages, for $50 million. This was followed by Whiteboard.fi, which develops software for digital, online whiteboards. Kahoot! also acquired the Danish startup Actimo, which developed employee training software, for $33 million. It was acquired to expand Kahoot!'s features for business users. In March 2021, Kahoot! went public on the Oslo stock exchange. In April 2021, Kahoot! acquired Motimate, a corporate learning company based in Norway, for $25 million. In 2021, Kahoot! announced that it would acquire SSO digital learning platform Clever, Inc. for $500 million.

In 2023, Kahoot! was acquired by a group of investors, including Goldman Sachs Asset Management for $1.72 billion in cash. In January 2024, Kahoot!'s shares were delisted from the Oslo Stock Exchange.

== Research ==
In 2016, an evaluation of Kahoot!'s pedagogical quality by Education Alliance Finland (formerly Kokoa Standard) suggested that Kahoot!'s educational value was highest when students are creating quizzes of relevant topics themselves, because it uses creativity and practices 21st-century skills.

A literature review containing 93 studies on the effect of using Kahoot! for learning was published in the journal Computers & Education in 2020, it found that using the platform had an overall positive effect on classroom dynamics, learning and anxiety.

A 2023 meta-analysis of 41 studies involving 5,071 participants, published in Frontiers in Psychology, found that gamified learning produces a large effect size (Hedges' g = 0.822) on learning outcomes compared to traditional instruction.

== See also ==
- Quizlet
- Anki
- Chegg
- Course Hero
