= French as a foreign language =

Use of French by non-Francophones

French as a foreign language (French pronunciation: [fʁɑ̃sɛ lɑ̃ɡ etʁɑ̃ʒɛʁ]; français langue étrangère, FLE) is the use of French by non-native speakers in a country where French is not normally spoken, similar to English as a foreign language. There is no single test like the TOEFL, but instead a variety of possible tests used to measure language proficiency of non-francophones in non-francophone countries. It is specifically different from Français langue seconde (FLS) which is used when referring to prospective immigrants to francophone countries. It is related to, but not identical from French immersion, which is a strategy for teaching French as a second (never "foreign") language to children, especially in English Canada.

== Learning ==
=== Teaching in French-speaking countries ===
==== For adults ====
Several types of institutions cater to adults:

===== Language school =====
Private language schools, whether commercial or nonprofit, or university language centers welcome nearly 100,000 students annually (citation needed), who learn French as part of their studies. With the increase in student mobility, these centers have multiplied. Since 2007, the French ministries of Education, Higher Education and Research, Foreign Affairs, and Culture and Communication have implemented the "Qualité FLE" label, which evaluates four criteria: accommodation and hospitality, the quality of teaching and courses, facilities, and management.

In Switzerland, a "French as a Foreign Language School" is affiliated with the Faculty of Letters at the University of Lausanne (canton of Vaud). FLE is integrated into both bachelor's and master's degree programs. Additional courses, such as Satellite classes and the EFLE Free Plan, are available to exchange students and non-native speakers enrolled in other studies. These programs cater to over 1,000 students from more than 70 countries each year.

===== Alliance Française =====
Nonprofit organizations, the Alliance Française network promotes the French language and Francophone culture worldwide. Certified since 2007 under the "Qualité FLE" label, the Alliances Françaises in French-speaking and non-French-speaking countries are key players in teaching French as a Foreign Language.

With over 9,000 students from 160 nationalities annually, the Alliance Française Paris Île-de-France is the largest French language school in France. It was also at the Alliance Française in Paris that the first methods for teaching French as a Foreign Language were developed, including the Mauger Bleu, officially published in 1953 but in use as early as 1894.

===== Nonprofit organizations =====
Nonprofit organizations, such as community centers and social centers, often provide free or low-cost French lessons, sometimes taught by volunteers. However, some nonprofit organizations or local authorities aiming to promote the social integration of foreign residents hire professional instructors to teach FLE or literacy programs.

In France, these programs can be part of the Republican Integration Contract (CIR), signed by newcomers and the French Office for Immigration and Integration (OFII), which acts on behalf of the state.

===== Business =====
In France, the teaching of FLE in businesses has grown following the 2004 law recognizing French proficiency as a professional skill. Training may be funded under continuous professional development programs or through the French Individual Right to Training.

==== For Children ====
Within the French national education system, specialized classes called Units for Newly Arrived Allophone Students (UPE2A) cater to non-French-speaking minors who have recently arrived in France.

=== Teaching in non-French-speaking countries ===
The vast majority of institutions within the cultural network of the French Ministry of Foreign Affairs (such as cultural centers and Institut Français) teach French to foreigners. Exceptions exist in cities where they coexist with an Alliance Française, such as Lisbon or Zagreb, where the Alliance Française handles language courses while the Institut Français focuses on cultural events and library resources.

The Alliances Françaises, as nonprofit local entities, are officially recognized by the French government for teaching French as a Foreign Language. These institutions sign agreements with French embassies to establish joint objectives and allocate resources as necessary.

In addition to these public entities, many private schools and centers also teach French worldwide.

French language attachés and educational cooperation officers posted in French embassies abroad play a significant role in promoting French in foreign education systems. Their efforts include developing bilingual programs, funding training for school and university teachers, and supporting partnerships between institutions.

=== Exclusively online FLE teaching ===
With the rise of digital technologies, French as a Foreign Language (FLE) has adapted to online formats, enabling learners worldwide to access quality educational content from anywhere. Online courses provide flexibility and personalized instruction based on the learner's goals, needs, and proficiency level. Classes may be one-on-one or in groups.

==== Online schools for children ====
Some platforms and schools specialize in teaching FLE to children using methods tailored to their cognitive development and specific needs. These courses integrate interactive and engaging activities to stimulate interest and enhance learning. Unlike teaching methods for adults, teaching children focuses more on repetition, contextual learning, and natural acquisition through games and creative activities.

Additionally, teachers in this field adapt their methods to meet parents’ expectations while adhering to international standards, such as the Common European Framework of Reference for Languages (CEFR). These practices ensure a structured learning progression that matches the child's age and language level.

=== Self-learning ===
French can be learned through platforms like Babbel, Busuu, Duolingo, Gymglish (+ Aimigo Coach), Lingvist, or Cmonprof (an online FLE school dedicated to children).

== Diplomas, certifications and examinations ==
The Centre international d'études pédagogiques (CIEP) of the French Ministry of Education offers three diplomas and an examination. The Diplôme Initial de Langue Française (DILF), DELF and DALF certify a certain level of French, and the Test de connaissance du français (TCF) to demonstrate language proficiency for university admission.

The Alliance française offers 2 certificates and 2 diplomas: Certificat d’Études de Français Pratique 1 and 2 (CEFP1 and CEFP2), the Diplôme de Langue (DL) and the Diplôme Supérieur Langue et Culture Françaises (DSLCF).

The Paris Chamber of Commerce (Chambre de commerce et d'industrie de Paris or CCIP) offers a variety of diplomas as well as the Test d'évaluation du français (TEF).

== See also ==
=== Language terminology ===
- Second language
- Foreign language

=== General language teaching and learning ===
- Language education
- Second language acquisition
- Applied linguistics
