= List of language self-study programs =

Self-study language acquisition programs allow learning without having a teacher present, and the courses can supplement or replace classroom instruction. Universities use self-study programs for less-commonly taught languages, where having professors is not feasible. Self-study programs are available on paper, audio files, video files, smartphone apps, computers, or any combination.

This list is limited to programs that teach four or more languages. There are many others that teach one language.

Alphabetical lists of languages show the courses available to learn each language, at All Language Resources, Lang1234, Martindale's Language Center, Omniglot, and Rüdiger Köppe. (UCLA Language Materials Project has ended.) For the thousands of languages not listed on those sites, for which no course exists, Global Recordings Network has recorded a standard set of Bible stories in 6,000 languages. With effort, learners can study any language by comparing their recordings to the same story in a language they know.

The list of self-study programs, below, shows the number of languages taught by each program, the name of the program, and the number of different languages used for instruction. Multiple languages of instruction may be available for some but not all courses. For example, Reise Know-How uses six languages to teach German, but only German to teach the other languages. On the other hand Eurotalk, Pronunciator and 50Languages use all languages to teach all the other languages.

== List ==
Self-study program	Number of languages taught	Interface languages	Media	Business Model
50Languages	56	56	Web	Free audio, apps, downloads, sell optional books
Alison	6	1 (English)		Free
Assimil	76	12	Books, USB drive	
Babbel	14	9 (English, French, German, Italian, Polish, Portuguese, Spanish, Swedish, Ukrainian)	Application	Subscription
BBC Online	40	1 (English)	Web	Free
Behind the Wheel by Macmillan Publishers	9	1 (English)	Physical media	
Berlitz Corporation	23	1 (English)	Online classes, offline classes, books, PE (physical media)	Varies
Bilingual Books, Inc.	12	2 (English, German)	Physical media	
Busuu	14	15	Application	Freemium
Central Institute of Indian Languages	47	1 (English)	Physical media	sell books
Colloquial by Routledge	56	1 (English)	Physical media	Sell books, CDs
Cortina Method by Rafael Díez de la Cortina y Olaeta	10	1 (English)	Physical media	
Drive Time by Random House	5	1 (English)	Physical media	
Drops	51	24	Application	Freemium
Duolingo	43	25	Application, Web	Freemium with all learning features free
Durium by Durium Records	4	1 (Italian)	Physical media	
Eurotalk	132	119	Application	
FirstVoices	82	1 (English)		Free
For Dummies	17	2 (English, German)	Physical media	
Foreign Service Institute	42	1 (English)	Web	Free
Gloss by Defense Language Institute	29	1 (English)	Web	Free
Hugo by Dorling Kindersley	5	1 (English)	Physical media	
Idiot's Guide	10	2 (English, Spanish)	Physical media	
L'Harmattan	167	1 (French)	Books	
Langenscheidt	17	2 (English, German)	Physical media	
Language Reactor	40	28	Browser extension, website	Freemium
LingQ	50	17	Application, Web	Freemium
Linguaphone	16	2 (English, German)	Physical media	
Lingvist	8	8 (Arabic, Chinese, English, Estonian, German, Japanese, Portuguese, Russian)	Online, mobile app	Freemium
Living Language (publisher)	18	7 (Arabic, English, Chinese, Japanese, Korean, Russian, Spanish)	Physical media	
Living Tongues Institute for Endangered Languages	6	1 (English)		Free
Lonely Planet	6	1 (English)	Physical media	
Made Simple by Broadway Books	7	1 (English)	Physical media	
Mango Languages	71	17	Application	Free to library patrons if library pays, or monthly subscription
Memrise	35 (official courses); Hundreds (user-created courses)	15	Application	Freemium
Michel Thomas Method	12	1 (English)	Physical media	
Mondly	41	30	Application	Freemium
Paul Noble Method by Collins	5	1 (English)	Physical media	
Peace Corps	101	1 (English)	Web	Free
Pimsleur Language Programs (company)	51	51	Application, Web	One-time/subscription
Pronunciator	87	50		Free to library patrons if library pays
Quizlet	18	8 (Chinese, English, French, German, Japanese, Korean, Russian, Spanish)	Online	Freemium
Reise Know-How	200	7	Books	
Rosetta Stone	25	1 (English)	Software	One-time/subscription
Schaum's Outlines	6	1 (English)	Physical media	
Smigin	4	3 (English, Portuguese, Turkish)		Subscription
Tandem	300+	1 (English)	App	Freemium
Teach Yourself	58	1 (English)	Books, CDs	
Teach Yourself Business by McGraw-Hill Education	4	1 (English)	Physical media	
Transparent Language Online	130	6	Online, mobile app	Monthly or yearly subscription, or free to library patrons if library pays

== See also ==
- Computer-assisted language learning
- Language learning video games
- Language MOOC
- List of flashcard software
- Virtual world language learning
