= Reise =

Reise may refer to:

== People ==
- Jay Reise (born 1950), American composer
- Leo Reise, Sr
- Leo Reise Jr.
- Reise Allassani (born 1996), English football player

== Arts ==
- Die Reise or The Journey (1986 film), 1986 Swiss-German film
- Die Reise (album), 2018 Max Giesinger album
- Reise, Reise, 2004 Neue Deutsche album

== Other ==
- Reise Know-How, German company group
