= Odette Melono =

Cameroonian diplomat

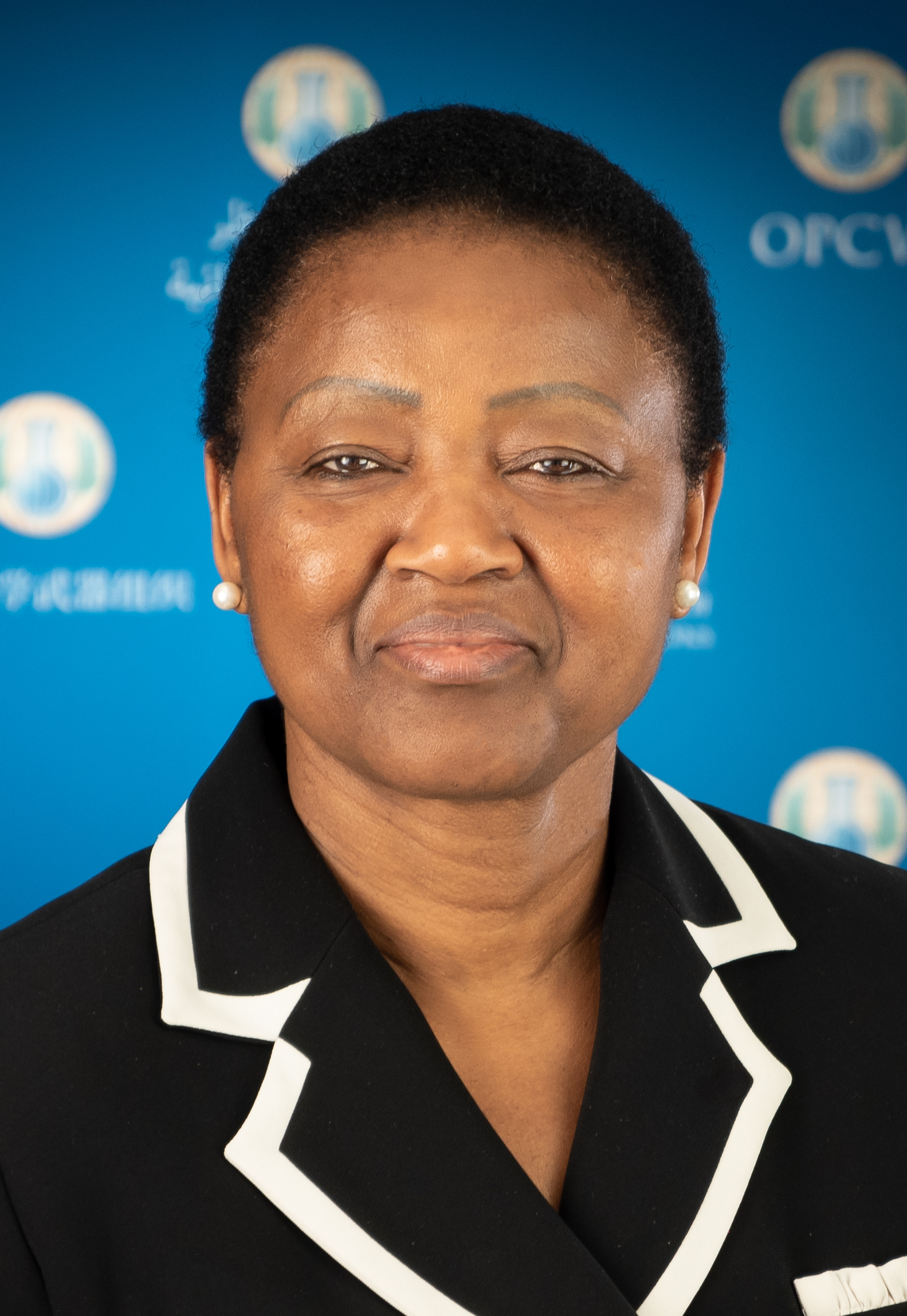
- Melono in 2019

Deputy Director-General of the Organisation for the Prohibition of Chemical Weapons (OPCW)
- Incumbent
- Assumed office January 14, 2019
- Preceded by: Hamid Ali Rao

Odette Melono is a Cameroonian diplomat. She has served as Ambassador of Cameroon to the Netherlands and Luxembourg, Permanent Representative of Cameroon to the Organisation for the Prohibition of Chemical Weapons (OPCW) and has been Deputy Director-General of the OPCW since 2019.

== Education ==
Melono graduated from the University of Paris X with a Bachelor's and a master's degree in Law before going on to earn a master's degree in Corporate Tax Management from the University of Paris-Dauphine and a master's degree as well as a Doctorate in International Relations from the University of Yaoundé II.

== Career ==
Melono served as Ambassador of Cameroon to the Netherlands and the Grand Duchy of Luxembourg and the Permanent Representative of Cameroon to the Organisation for the Prohibition of Chemical Weapons (OPCW) from 2008 to 2018. She was the first full Cameroonian Ambassador to serve in the Netherlands.

In 2015, Melono was Dean of the African Group of Ambassadors, succeeding Nigerian diplomat Nimota Nihinlola Akanbi.

Melono chaired the OPCW Executive Council from May 2016 to May 2017. She became Deputy Director-General of the Organisation for the Prohibition of Chemical Weapons (OPCW) on January 14, 2019.
