= Bitame Lucia International School =

School in Cameroon

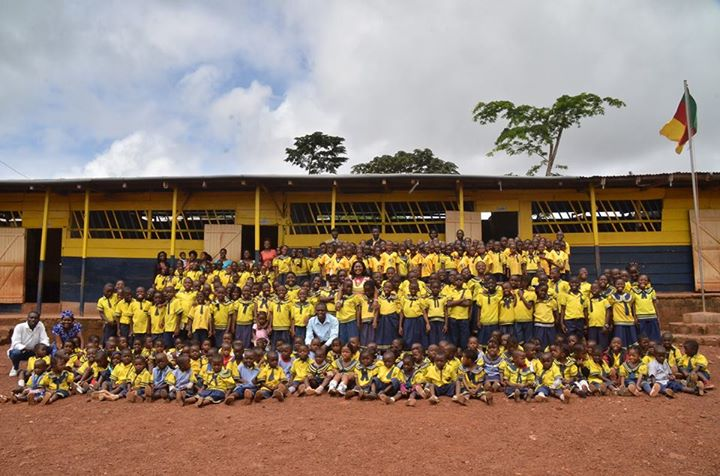
Pupils and teachers in summer 2014

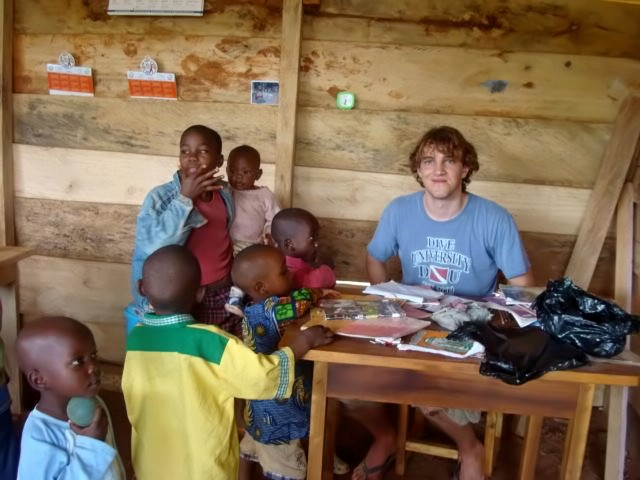
First international volunteer from United Kingdom teaches kids in February 2009

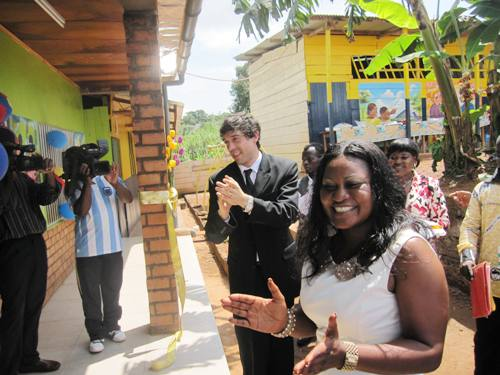
US Embassy officer Luke Ortega opened new BLIS classroom in November 2012

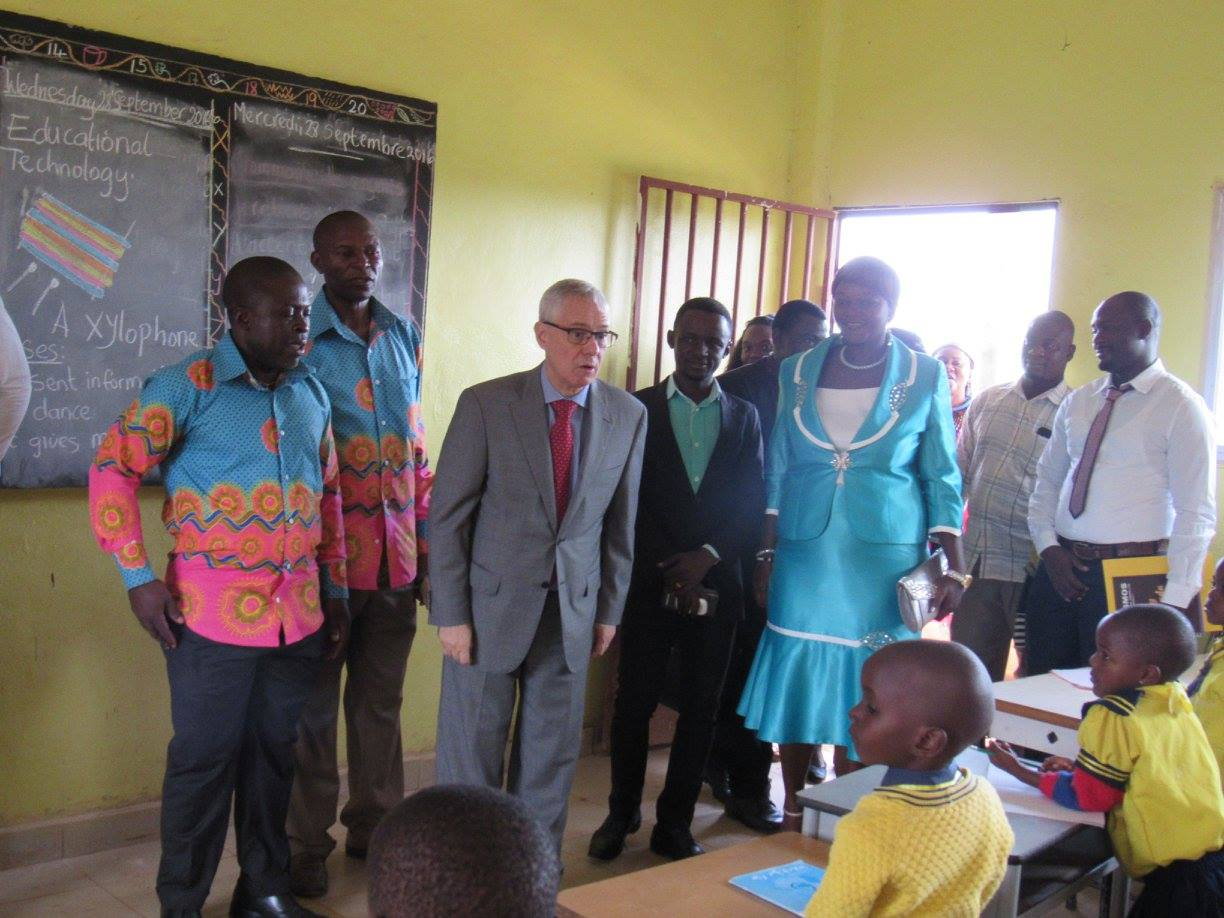
Official visit of Brazilian Ambassador at BLIS on 29 September 2016

Bitame Lucia International School (BLIS) provides the preschool and the primary bilingual school (English and French) in Nkolfoulou village located 12 km from Yaoundé, Cameroon. The school was founded in February 2009 by the teacher Lucia Bitame and managing director Ajomuzu Collette Bekaku, founder of the Cameroon Association for the Protection and Education of the Child (CAPEC).

== History ==
The school started in February 2009 with the help of international volunteers from United Kingdom, Netherlands, etc. On 20 November 2012, was opened a new classroom constructed with the help of US Embassy Ambassador's Program. In 2014 after the crowdfunding at Indiegogo was built a new concrete 3-floor school building. Beside classrooms, the school has a big hall where various events are organized for students and their parents. On 29 September 2016, Brazilian Ambassador Dr Nei Futuro Bitencourt visited BLIS and taught Bitame Lucia International College students a lesson about Brazil

== International volunteers and sponsors ==
The school offers teaching opportunities for international volunteers. Partners and sponsors include Busuu, Develop Africa, Google, OLPC, etc.
