= Tigrinya language =

Semitic language spoken in Ethiopia and Eritrea

Tigrinya
- ትግርኛ (Təgrəñña)
- Pronunciation: [tɨɡrɨɲːä]
- Native to: Eritrea, Ethiopia
- Ethnicity: Tigrayans; Tigrinya
- Native speakers: 9.9 million (2022–2023)
- Language family: Afro-Asiatic: Semitic; West Semitic; South Semitic; Ethiopic; North; Tigrinya
- Writing system: Geʽez script (Tigrinya abugida)

Official status
- Official language in: Eritrea; Ethiopia

Language codes
- ISO 639-1: ti
- ISO 639-2: tir
- ISO 639-3: tir
- Glottolog: tigr1271
- Countries where Tigrinya holds official status: Eritrea Ethiopia

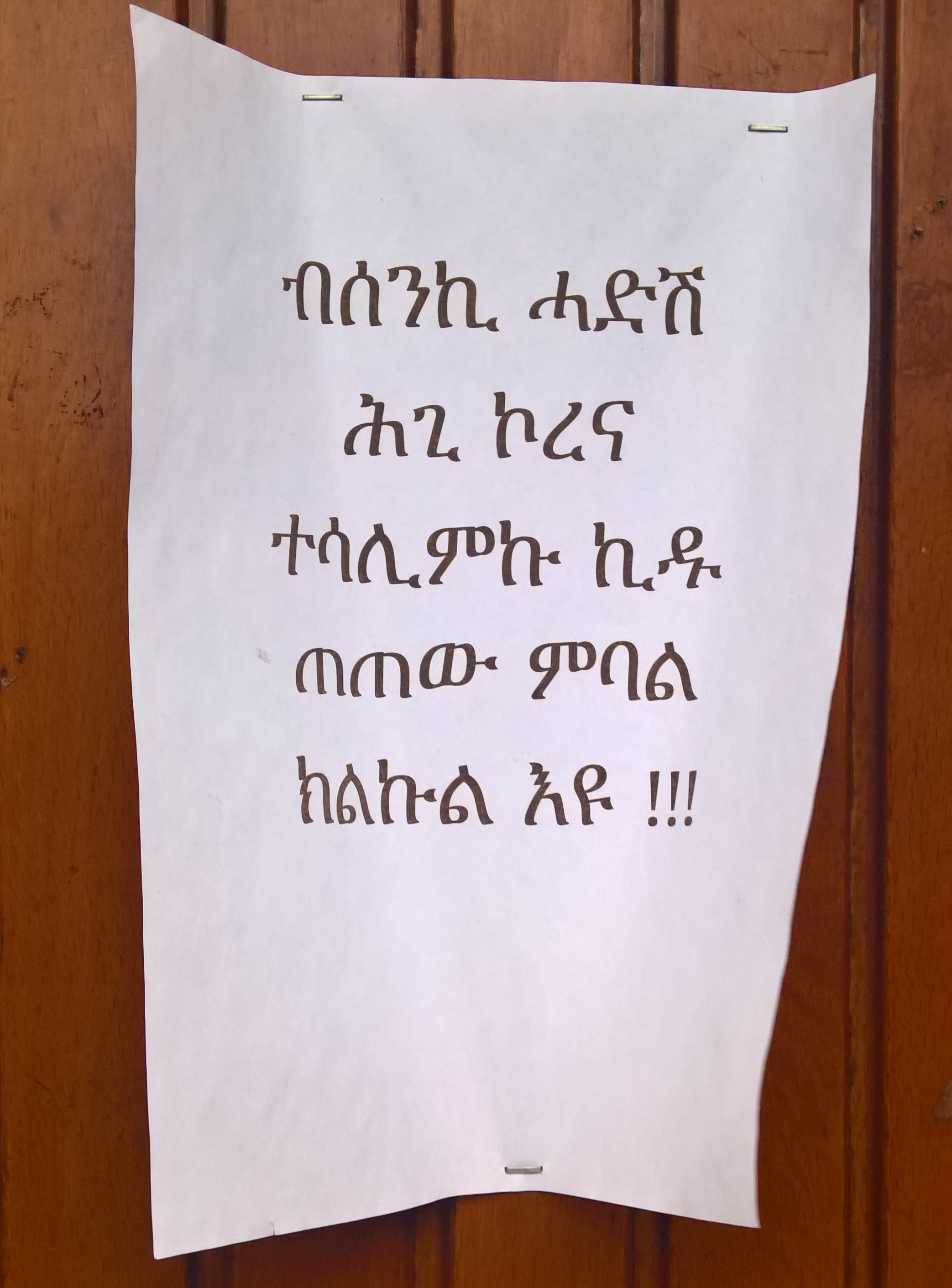
Tigrinya notices at an Eritrean Orthodox Church in Schiebroek, Rotterdam, Netherlands.

Tigrinya, (Note: ትግርኛ, Təgrəñña, IPA: [tɨɡrɨɲːä]) sometimes romanized according to Italian spelling rules as Tigrigna, is an Ethio-Semitic language, which is a subgrouping within the Semitic branch of the Afroasiatic languages. It is primarily spoken by the Tigrinya and Tigrayan peoples, native to Eritrea and to the Tigray Region of Ethiopia, respectively. It is also spoken by the global diaspora of these regions.

== History and literature ==
Although it differs markedly from the Geʽez (Classical Ethiopic) language, for instance in having phrasal verbs, and in using a word order that places the main verb last instead of first in the sentence, there is a strong influence of Geʽez on Tigrinya literature, especially with terms relating to Christian life, Biblical names, and so on. Ge'ez, because of its status in Eritrean and Ethiopian culture, and possibly also its simple structure, acted as a literary medium until relatively recent times. Tigrinya is lexically 68% similar to Geʽez, slightly higher than the lexical similarity of Amharic to the ancient language at 62%.

Despite a rich oral tradition, Tigrinya historically lacked a written literary tradition, which Carlo Conti Rossini attributed to the use of Ge'ez in church texts and within rural learned circles, along with Amharic's status as the official language of the ruling authorities. The earliest known example of Tigrinya literature is a text of local laws found in the district of Loggo Sarda (located in present-day Debub Region of Eritrea), believed to be from the 19th century. The legal code was found inserted within a Ge'ez manuscript of the Gospels dated to approximately the late 15th or early 16th century.

In Eritrea, during British administration, the Ministry of Information put out a weekly newspaper in Tigrinya that cost 5 cents and sold 5,000 copies weekly. At the time, it was reported to be the first of its kind.

Tigrinya (along with Arabic) was one of Eritrea's official languages during its short-lived federation with Ethiopia. In 1958, it was replaced by the Southern Ethiopic language Amharic prior to Eritrea's annexation. Upon Eritrea's independence in 1991, Tigrinya retained the status of working language in the country. Eritrea was the only state in the world to officially recognize Tigrinya until 2020, when Ethiopia made changes to recognize Tigrinya on a national level.

== Speakers ==
There is no general name for the people who speak Tigrinya. In Eritrea, Tigrinya speakers are officially known as the Bəher-Təgrəñña ('nation of Tigrinya speakers') or Tigrinya people. In Ethiopia, a Tigrayan, that is a native of Tigray, who also speaks the Tigrinya language, is referred to in Tigrinya as təgraway (male), təgrawäyti (female), tägaru (plural). Bəher roughly means "nation" in the ethnic sense of the word in Tigrinya, Tigre, Amharic and Ge'ez. The Jeberti in Eritrea also speak Tigrinya.

Tigrinya is the most widely spoken language in Eritrea, and the fourth most spoken language in Ethiopia after Amharic, Oromo, and Somali. It is also spoken by large immigrant communities around the world, in countries including Sudan, Saudi Arabia, Israel, Denmark, Germany, Uganda, Italy, Sweden, the United Kingdom, Canada and the United States. In Australia, Tigrinya is one of the languages broadcast on public radio via the multicultural Special Broadcasting Service.

Tigrinya dialects differ phonetically, lexically, and grammatically. No dialect appears to be accepted as a standard. Even though the most spread and used in, for example books, movies and news is the Asmara dialect.

== Phonology ==
For the representation of Tigrinya sounds, this article uses a modification of a system that is common (though not universal) among linguists who work on Ethiopian Semitic languages, but differs somewhat from the conventions of the International Phonetic Alphabet.

=== Consonant phonemes ===
Tigrinya has a fairly typical set of phonemes for an Ethiopian Semitic language. That is, there is a set of ejective consonants and the usual seven-vowel system. Unlike many of the modern Ethiopian Semitic languages, Tigrinya has preserved the two pharyngeal consonants which were apparently part of the ancient Geʽez language and which, along with [xʼ], voiceless velar ejective fricative or voiceless uvular ejective fricative, make it easy to distinguish spoken Tigrinya from related languages such as Amharic, though not from Tigre, which has also maintained the pharyngeal consonants.

The charts below show the phonemes of Tigrinya. The sounds are shown using the same system for representing the sounds as in the rest of the article. When the IPA symbol is different, the orthography is indicated in brackets.

Consonants
		Labial	Dental/ Alveolar	Postalveolar/ Palatal	Velar		Pharyngeal	Glottal
		Labial	Dental/ Alveolar	Postalveolar/ Palatal	Plain	Lab.	Pharyngeal	Glottal
Nasal		m	n	ɲ ⟨ñ⟩				
Plosive/affricate	voiceless	p	t	tʃ ⟨č⟩	k	kʷ		ʔ ⟨’⟩
Plosive/affricate	voiced	b	d	dʒ ⟨ǧ⟩	ɡ	ɡʷ		
Plosive/affricate	ejective	pʼ ⟨p̣⟩	tʼ ⟨ṭ⟩	tʃʼ ⟨č̣⟩	kʼ ⟨q⟩	kʷʼ ⟨qʷ⟩		
Fricative	voiceless	f	s	ʃ ⟨š⟩	x (Note: The fricative sounds [x], [xʷ], [xʼ] and [xʷʼ] occur as allophones of the corresponding velar plosives.) ⟨ḵ⟩	xʷ ⟨ḵʷ⟩	ħ ⟨ḥ⟩	h
Fricative	voiced	v (Note: The consonant /v/ occurs only in recent borrowings from European languages.)	z	ʒ ⟨ž⟩			ʕ ⟨ʽ⟩	
Fricative	ejective		tsʼ ⟨ṣ⟩		xʼ ⟨q̱⟩	xʷʼ ⟨q̱ʷ⟩		
Approximant			l	j ⟨y⟩		w		
Rhotic			r					

=== Vowel phonemes ===
The sounds are shown using the same system for representing the sounds as in the rest of the article. When the IPA symbol is different, the orthography is indicated in brackets.

Vowels
	Front	Central	Back
Close	i	ɨ ⟨ə⟩	u
Mid	e	ɐ ⟨ä⟩	o
Open		a	

=== Gemination ===
Gemination, the doubling of a consonantal sound, is meaningful in Tigrinya, i.e. it affects the meaning of words. While gemination plays an important role in the morphology of the Tigrinya verb, it is normally accompanied by other marks. But there is a small number of pairs of words which are only differentiable from each other by gemination, e.g. /kʼɐrrɐbɐ/, ('he brought forth'); /kʼɐrɐbɐ/, ('he came closer'). All consonants, with the exception of the pharyngeal and glottal ones, can be geminated.

=== Allophones ===
The velar consonants /k/ and /kʼ/ are pronounced differently when they appear immediately after a vowel and are not geminated. In these circumstances, /k/ is pronounced as a velar fricative. /kʼ/ is pronounced as a fricative, or sometimes as an affricate. This fricative or affricate is more often pronounced further back, in the uvular place of articulation (although it is represented in this article as [xʼ]). All of these possible realizations – velar ejective fricative, uvular ejective fricative, velar ejective affricate and uvular ejective affricate – are cross-linguistically very rare sounds.

Since these two sounds are completely conditioned by their environments, they can be considered allophones of /k/ and /kʼ/. This is especially clear from verb roots in which one consonant is realized as one or the other allophone depending on what precedes it. For example, for the verb meaning 'cry', which has the triconsonantal root √b-k-y, there are forms such as ምብካይ /məbkaj/ ('to cry') and በኸየ /bɐxɐjɐ/ ('he cried'), and for the verb meaning 'steal', which has the triconsonantal root √s-r-kʼ, there are forms such as ይሰርቁ /jəsɐrkʼu/ ('they steal') and ይሰርቕ /jəsɐrrəxʼ/ ('he steals').

What is especially interesting about these pairs of phones is that they are distinguished in Tigrinya orthography. Because allophones are completely predictable, it is quite unusual for them to be represented with distinct symbols in the written form of a language.

=== Syllables ===
A Tigrinya syllable may consist of a consonant-vowel or a consonant-vowel-consonant sequence. When three consonants (or one geminated consonant and one simple consonant) come together within a word, the cluster is broken up with the introduction of an epenthetic vowel -ə-, and when two consonants (or one geminated consonant) would otherwise end a word, the vowel -i appears after them, or (when this happens because of the presence of a suffix) -ə- is introduced before the suffix. For example,

Root	ከብድ √k-b-d	ልብ √l-b-b
-ኢ -i '∅'	ከብዲ käbdi 'stomach'	ልቢ ləbbi 'heart'
-አይ -äy 'my'	ከብደይ käbdäy 'my stomach'	ልበይ ləbbäy 'my heart'
-ካ -ka 'your (masc.)'	ከብድኻ käbdəxa 'your (masc.) stomach'	ልብኻ ləbbəxa 'your (masc.) heart'
-ን…-ን -n… -n 'and'	ከብድን ልብን käbdən ləbbən 'stomach and heart'	

Stress is neither contrastive nor particularly salient in Tigrinya. It seems to depend on gemination, but it has apparently not been systematically investigated.

== Grammar ==
=== Typical grammatical features ===
Grammatically, Tigrinya is a typical Ethiopian Semitic (ES) language in most ways:

- A Tigrinya noun is treated as either masculine or feminine. However, most inanimate nouns do not have a fixed gender.
- Tigrinya nouns have plural, as well as singular, forms, though the plural is not obligatory when the linguistic or pragmatic context makes the number clear. As in Tigre and Geʼez (as well as Arabic), noun plurals may be formed through internal changes ("broken" plural) as well as through the addition of suffixes. For example, ፈረስ färäs 'horse', ኣፍራሰ ʼafras 'horses'.
- Adjectives behave in most ways like nouns. Most Tigrinya adjectives, like those in Tigre and Ge'ez, have feminine and plural (both genders) forms. For example, ጽቡቕ ṣǝbbuq̱ 'good (m.sg.)', ጽብቕቲ ṣǝbbǝq̱ti 'good (f.sg.)', ጽቡቓት ṣǝbbuq̱at 'good (m./f. pl.)'
- Within personal pronouns and subject agreement inflections on verbs, gender is distinguished in second person as well as third. For example, ተዛረብ täzaräb 'speak! (m.sg.)', ተዛረቢ täzaräbi 'speak (f.sg.)'.
- Possessive adjectives take the form of noun suffixes: ገዛ gäza 'house', ገዛይ gäza-y 'my house', ገዛኺ gäza-ḵi 'your (f.sg.) house'.
- Verbs are based on consonantal roots, most consisting of three consonants: √sbr 'break', ሰበረ säbärä 'he broke', ይሰብር yǝsäbbǝr 'he breaks', ምስባር mǝsbar 'to break'.
- Within the tense system there is a basic distinction between the perfective form—conjugated with suffixes and denoting the past—and the imperfective form—conjugated with prefixes and in some cases suffixes—and denoting the present or future: ሰበሩ säbär-u 'they broke', ይሰብሩ yǝ-säbr-u 'they break'.
- As in Ge'ez and Amharic, there is also a separate "gerundive" form of the verb, conjugated with suffixes and used to link verbs within a sentence: ገዲፍካ ተዛረብ gädifka täzaräb 'stop (that) and speak (m.sg.)'.
- Verbs also have a separate jussive/imperative form, similar to the imperfective: ይስበሩ yǝ-sbär-u 'let them break'.
- Through the addition of derivational morphology (internal changes to verb stems and/or prefixes), verbs may be made passive, reflexive, causative, frequentative, reciprocal, or reciprocal causative: ፈለጡ fäläṭ-u 'they knew', ተፈልጡ tä-fälṭ-u 'they were known', ኣፈልጡ ʼa-fälṭ-u 'they caused to know (they introduced)', ተፋለጡ tä-faläṭ-u 'they knew each other', ኣፋለጡ ʼa-f-faläṭ-u 'they caused to know each other'.
- Verbs may take direct object and prepositional pronoun suffixes: ፈለጠኒ fäläṭä-nni 'he knew me', ፈለጠለይ fäläṭä-lläy 'he knew for me'.
- Negation is expressed through the prefix ay- and, in independent clauses, the suffix -n: ኣይፈለጠን ʼay-fäläṭä-n 'he didn't know'.
- The copula and the verb of existence in the present are irregular: ኣሎ ʼallo 'there is, he exists', እዩ ʼǝyyu 'he is', የለን or የልቦን yällän or yälbon 'there isn't, he doesn't exist', ኣይኰነን ʼaykʷänän 'he isn't, it isn't', ነበረ näbärä 'he existed, he was, there was', ይኸውን yǝ-ḵäwwǝn 'he will be', ይነብር yǝ-näbbǝr 'he will exist, there will be'.
- The verb of existence together with object suffixes for the possessor expresses possession ('have') and obligation ('must'): ኣሎኒ ʼallo-nni 'I have, I must' (lit. 'there is to') me').
- Relative clauses are expressed by a prefix attached to the verb: ዝፈለጠ zǝ-fäläṭä 'who knew'
- Cleft sentences, with relative clauses normally following the copula, are very common: መን እዩ ዝፈለጠ män ʼǝyyu zǝ-fäläṭä 'who knew?' (lit. 'who is he who knew?').
- There is an accusative marker used on definite direct objects. In Tigrinya this is the prefix nǝ-. For example, ሓጐስ ንኣልማዝ ረኺቡዋ ḥagʷäs nǝ’almaz räḵibuwwa 'Hagos met Almaz'.
- As in other modern Ethiopian Semitic languages, the default word order in clauses is subject–object–verb, and noun modifiers usually (though not always in Tigrinya) precede their head nouns.

=== Innovations ===
Tigrinya grammar is unique within the Ethiopian Semitic language family in several ways:

- For second-person pronouns, there is a separate vocative form, used to get a person's attention: ንስኻ nǝssǝḵa 'you (m.sg.)', ኣታ ʼatta 'you! (m.sg.)'.
- There is a definite article, related (as in English) to the demonstrative adjective meaning 'that': እታ ጓል ʼǝta gʷal 'the girl'.
- The gerundive form is used for past tense, as well as for the linking function as in Ge'ez and Amharic: ተዛሪቡ täzaribu '(he) speaking, he spoke'.
- Yes–no questions are marked by the particle ዶ do following the questioned word or the verb, if there is none: ሓፍተይዶ ርኢኺ ḥaftäydo rǝʼiḵi 'did you (f.sg.) see my sister?'.
- The negative circumfix ʼay- -n may mark nouns, pronouns, and adjectives as well as verbs: ኣይኣነን ʼay-ʼanä-n 'not me', ኣይዓብይን ʼayʽabǝy-ǝn 'not big'
- Tigrinya has an unusually complex tense–aspect–mood system, with many nuances achieved using combinations of the three basic aspectual forms (perfect, imperfect, gerundive) and various auxiliary verbs including the copula (እዩ ʼǝyyu, etc.), the verb of existence (ኣሎ ʼallo, etc.), and the verbs ነበረ näbärä 'exist, live', ኮነ konä 'become', ጸንሔ s'änḥe 'stay'.
- Tigrinya has compound prepositions corresponding to the preposition–postposition compounds found in Amharic: ኣብ ልዕሊ ዓራት ʼab lǝʽli ʽarat 'on (top of) the bed', ኣብ ትሕቲ ዓራት ʼab tǝḥti ʽarat 'under the bed'
- Unlike most Ethiopian Semitic languages, Tigrinya has only one set of applicative suffixes, used both for the dative and benefactive and for locative and adversative senses: ተቐሚጣሉ täq̱ämmiṭa-llu 'she sat down for him' or 'she sat down on it' or 'she sat down to his detriment'.

== Writing system ==
Tigrinya is written in the Geʽez script, originally developed for Geʽez. The Ethiopic script is an abugida: each symbol represents a consonant+vowel syllable, and the symbols are organized in groups of similar symbols on the basis of both the consonant and the vowel. In the table below the columns are assigned to the seven vowels of Tigrinya; they appear in the traditional order. The rows are assigned to the consonants, again in the traditional order.

For each consonant in an abugida, there is an unmarked symbol representing that consonant followed by a canonical or inherent vowel. For the Ethiopic abugida, this canonical vowel is ä, the first column in the table. However, since the pharyngeal and glottal consonants of Tigrinya (and other Ethiopian Semitic languages) cannot be followed by this vowel, the symbols in the first column for those consonants are pronounced with the vowel a, exactly as in the fourth column. These redundant symbols are falling into disuse in Tigrinya and are shown with a dark gray background in the table. When it is necessary to represent a consonant with no following vowel, the consonant+ə form is used (the symbol in the sixth column). For example, the word ʼǝntay 'what?' is written እንታይ, literally ʼǝ-nǝ-ta-yǝ.

Since some of the distinctions that were apparently made in Ge'ez have been lost in Tigrinya, there are two rows of symbols each for the consonants ‹ḥ›, ‹s›, and ‹sʼ›. In Eritrea, for ‹s› and ‹sʼ›, at least, one of these has fallen into disuse in Tigrinya and is now considered old-fashioned. These less-used series are shown with a dark gray background in the chart.

The orthography does not mark gemination, so the pair of words qärräbä 'he approached', qäräbä 'he was near' are both written ቀረበ. Since such minimal pairs are very rare, this presents no problem to readers of the language.

Tigrinya writing system
	ä	u	i	a	e	(ə)	o	wä	wi	wa	we	wə
h	ሀ	ሁ	ሂ	ሃ	ሄ	ህ	ሆ					
l	ለ	ሉ	ሊ	ላ	ሌ	ል	ሎ					
ḥ	ሐ	ሑ	ሒ	ሓ	ሔ	ሕ	ሖ					
m	መ	ሙ	ሚ	ማ	ሜ	ም	ሞ					
r	ረ	ሩ	ሪ	ራ	ሬ	ር	ሮ					
s	ሰ	ሱ	ሲ	ሳ	ሴ	ስ	ሶ					
š	ሸ	ሹ	ሺ	ሻ	ሼ	ሽ	ሾ					
q	ቀ	ቁ	ቂ	ቃ	ቄ	ቅ	ቆ	ቈ	ቊ	ቋ	ቌ	ቍ
q̱	ቐ	ቑ	ቒ	ቓ	ቔ	ቕ	ቖ	ቘ	ቚ	ቛ	ቜ	ቝ
b	በ	ቡ	ቢ	ባ	ቤ	ብ	ቦ					
v	ቨ	ቩ	ቪ	ቫ	ቬ	ቭ	ቮ					
t	ተ	ቱ	ቲ	ታ	ቴ	ት	ቶ					
č	ቸ	ቹ	ቺ	ቻ	ቼ	ች	ቾ					
n	ነ	ኑ	ኒ	ና	ኔ	ን	ኖ					
ñ	ኘ	ኙ	ኚ	ኛ	ኜ	ኝ	ኞ					
ʼ	አ	ኡ	ኢ	ኣ	ኤ	እ	ኦ					
k	ከ	ኩ	ኪ	ካ	ኬ	ክ	ኮ	ኰ	ኲ	ኳ	ኴ	ኵ
ḵ	ኸ	ኹ	ኺ	ኻ	ኼ	ኽ	ኾ	ዀ	ዂ	ዃ	ዄ	ዅ
w	ወ	ዉ	ዊ	ዋ	ዌ	ው	ዎ					
ʽ	ዐ	ዑ	ዒ	ዓ	ዔ	ዕ	ዖ					
z	ዘ	ዙ	ዚ	ዛ	ዜ	ዝ	ዞ					
ž	ዠ	ዡ	ዢ	ዣ	ዤ	ዥ	ዦ					
y	የ	ዩ	ዪ	ያ	ዬ	ይ	ዮ					
d	ደ	ዱ	ዲ	ዳ	ዴ	ድ	ዶ					
ǧ	ጀ	ጁ	ጂ	ጃ	ጄ	ጅ	ጆ					
g	ገ	ጉ	ጊ	ጋ	ጌ	ግ	ጎ	ጐ	ጒ	ጓ	ጔ	ጕ
ṭ	ጠ	ጡ	ጢ	ጣ	ጤ	ጥ	ጦ					
č̣	ጨ	ጩ	ጪ	ጫ	ጬ	ጭ	ጮ					
p̣	ጰ	ጱ	ጲ	ጳ	ጴ	ጵ	ጶ					
ṣ	ጸ	ጹ	ጺ	ጻ	ጼ	ጽ	ጾ					
f	ፈ	ፉ	ፊ	ፋ	ፌ	ፍ	ፎ					
p	ፐ	ፑ	ፒ	ፓ	ፔ	ፕ	ፖ					
	ä	u	i	a	e	(ə)	o	wä	wi	wa	we	wə

== See also ==
- UCLA Language Materials Project
