= Ajomuzu Collette Bekaku =

Cameroon activist

- Born: September 23, 1975 (age 51); Mambanda Village, Cameroon
- Citizenship: Cameroonian
- Education: University of Yaounde II
- Occupation: Activist
- Known for: Founder of Cameroon Association for the Protection and Education of the Child (CAPEC)

Ajomuzu Collette Bekaku (born 23 September 1975) is a human rights activist, CEO and founder of the Cameroon Association for the Protection and Education of the Child (CAPEC) that manages various community projects including the primary and secondary school.

== Early life ==
She was born in Mambanda Village, Southwest Region of Cameroon, and was raised by a single mother, a primary school teacher. She and her classmates had to work on banana and rubber plantations to help their families. It was often dangerous work and this inspired her to become an activist.

== Education ==
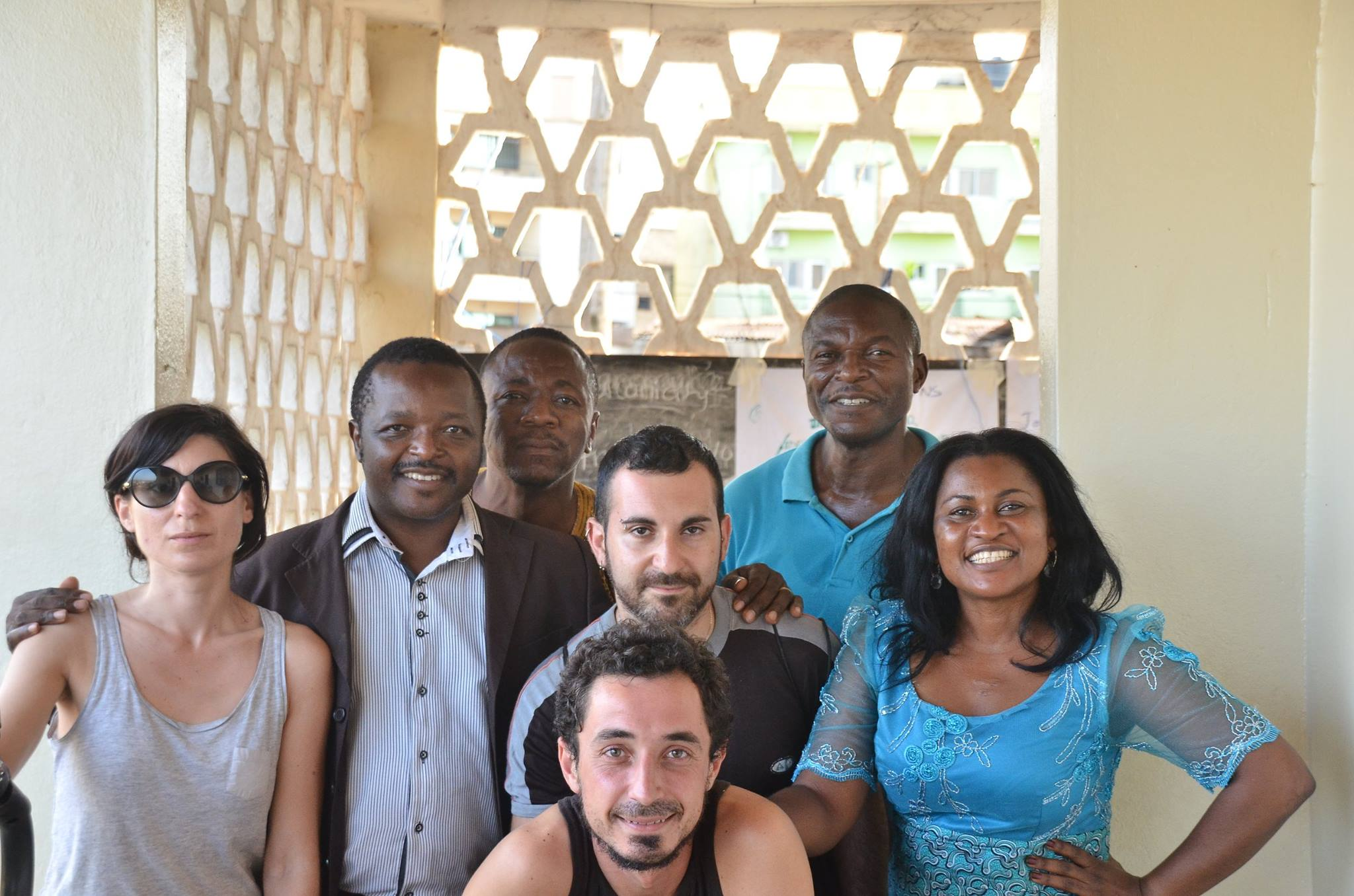
A.C. Bekaku (right) with domestic and international teachers in April 2014

In 2003 she graduated from University of Yaoundé II as a Master of Business Law and Management.

== Career ==
During university study she worked for the British Council Cameroon. In 2003 after graduation she founded the CAPEC and later 2 educational institutions. For the fundraising she used GlobalGiving, Indiegogo, and other web portals.

=== Cameroon Association for the Protection and Education of the Child (CAPEC) ===
CAPEC is a non-profit and non-governmental organization based in Yaoundé. Since 2003 it worked on many community projects, now it has offices in Yaoundé and Kumba and over 30 employees. The core activities include:

- gender and capacity building
- health / HIV / OVC (orphans and vulnerable children)
- education project.

Popular is its program for international volunteers. CAPEC is considered to be one of Cameroon's best child welfare organizations.

=== Bitame Lucia International School (BLIS) ===
In 2009 she co-founded the Bitame Lucia International School (BLIS) providing a nursery and a primary bilingual school (English and French). The school offers teaching opportunities for international volunteers. On 20 November 2012 was opened a new classroom constructed with the help of US Embassy Ambassador's Program. Partners and sponsors include Busuu, Develop Africa, Google, OLPC, etc.

=== Bitame Lucia International College (BLIC) ===
BLIC provides secondary education since 2015, in September 2016 it welcome the visit and a geographic lesson of the Brazilian ambassador Dr. Nei Futuro Bitencourt.
