= Die Reise =

Die Reise may refer to:

- The Journey (1986 film), a 1986 Swiss-German drama film
- Die Reise (album), a 2018 album by Max Giesinger
