= 50Languages =

Language learning software

50Languages, formerly Book2, is a set of webpages, downloadable audio files, mobile apps and books for learning any of 56 languages. Explanations are also available in the same 56 languages. It is free except for the optional books, and is cited in research on online language learning.

== Methods of teaching ==
For each language, the apps, website and books have 100 lessons, covering a broad range of topics for beginners and intermediate students: numbers, colors, travel situations, verb forms, and a small amount of business conversation. Users can click any phrase to repeat it as needed. Users can also download audio files (MP3) containing one or two languages. There are no pauses in the audio files to listen and repeat, so learners need to speak along with the recording (shadowing). In the app, learners can record their own voice for comparison with the recorded voice.

The recorded voices are native speakers of each language, usually both a man and woman.

They offer written tests in 25 languages, but no oral tests.

== Languages taught ==
Adyghe, Afrikaans, Albanian, Amharic, Arabic, Armenian, Belarusian, Bengali, Bosnian, Bulgarian, Catalan, Chinese, Croatian, Czech, Danish, Dutch, English-UK, English-US, Esperanto, Estonian, Finnish, French, Georgian, German, Greek, Hebrew, Hindi, Hungarian, Indonesian, Italian, Japanese, Kannada, Kazakh, Korean, Kurdish (Kurmanji), Kyrgyz, Latvian, Lithuanian, Macedonian, Marathi, Norwegian, Nynorsk, Persian, Polish, Portuguese-BR, Portuguese-PT, Punjabi, Romanian, Russian, Serbian, Slovak, Slovene, Spanish, Swedish, Tagalog, Tamil, Telugu, Thai, Tigrinya, Turkish, Ukrainian, Urdu, Vietnamese

== Business model ==
The publisher is Goethe Verlag, Starnberg, Germany. The books cost $10. Apps and web access are free, and audio files have a Creative Commons Attribution-NonCommercial-NoDerivatives license.

== See also ==
- Language education
- Language pedagogy
- List of Language Self-Study Programs
