= Eurotalk =

Educational publisher based in London

EuroTalk, also Utalk, is an educational publisher based in London, known primarily for its interactive language learning software. The company was established in 1991 by the company directors, Richard Howeson and Andrew Ashe. In 2016, EuroTalk rebranded as uTalk, and launched a new multi-platform app, also called uTalk.

== Language learning ==
uTalk's language software was originally available on CD-ROM, DVD-ROM, and later as a USB storage device and as a download. The company's range includes over 140 languages or dialects, including lesser-known languages such as Kinyarwanda, Chibemba, Esperanto, Greenlandic, Oromo and Cockney.

The company's products are sold worldwide through their website and distributors; 70% of their revenue comes from outside the UK. Their content is also sold under the Instant Immersion brand in the US.

uTalk has won The Queen's Award for Innovation.

== uTalk Language Games ==
In 2004 uTalk started to host an annual competition for children under 11 across Britain called the uTalk Junior Language Challenge. Now it is open to students of all ages under the name uTalk Language Games. Entrants are able to win prizes with a choice of over 150 languages to learn.

The goal of the competition is to encourage children to start learning languages at a young age. It also raises money for the company's sister charity, onebillion, funding educational resources in Malawi.

These games are a fun way of boosting speaking and listening skills in another language.

In 2019, uTalk won the Threlford Cup for their work on the uTalk Junior Language Challenge.

== See also ==
- Language education
- List of language self-study programs
