= Der Junge, der rennt =

Studio album by Max Giesinger
- Released: 8 April 2016
- Length: 44:57
- Label: BMG
- Producer: David Jürgens; Alexander Knolle; Jens Schneider

Max Giesinger chronology
Laufen lernen (2014)	Der Junge, der rennt (2016)	Die Reise (2018)

Der Junge, der rennt (English: The Boy Who Runs) is the second studio album by German recording artist Max Giesinger. It was released by BMG Rights Management on 8 April 2016 in German-speaking Europe.

== Critical reception ==
Professional ratings
Review scores
Source	Rating
laut.de	2/5 stars
Plattentests	3/10

Jeremias Heppeler from laut.de rated the album two out of five stars. He found that Giesinger was "putting everything on the line for a hit; the production has a clear objective in mind and pursues it single-mindedly. As a result, this album will undoubtedly find its audience. However, I predict it will be forgotten just as quickly. Sadly, Der Junge, Der Rennt resembles the work of a Voice of Germany finalist rather than that of a dedicated artist. With a bit more individuality, it could have been so much more." Johannes Mihram from Plattentests felt that while his "debut album Laufen lernen [...] still had its moments that went against the grain, every moment on Der Junge, der rennt is smoothed out."

== Commercial performance ==
Der Junge, der rennt debuted at number 20 on the German Albums Chart in the week of 15 April 2016. It was not until 27 January 2017, that it peaked at number 17 on the chart. The same year, the album was certified Platinum by the Bundesverband Musikindustrie (BVMI) for sales and streaming figures in excess of 200,000 units.

== Track listing ==
Credits adapted from the liner notes of Der Junge, der rennt.

Der Junge, der rennt – Standard edition
No.	Title	Writer(s)	Producer(s)	Length
1.	"Barfuß und allein"	Giesinger; Jens Schneider	Schneider	3:42
2.	"Roulette"	Giesinger; Schneider	Schneider	3:27
3.	"80 Millionen"	Giesinger; Alexander Zuckowski; Martin Fliegenschmidt; David Jürgens	Jürgens; Schneider	3:35
4.	"Ins Blaue" (featuring Elif)	Giesinger; Schneider; Mia Aegerter	Schneider	3:16
5.	"Wenn sie tanzt"	Giesinger; Schneider; Martin Haller	Schneider	3:33
6.	"Nicht so schnell"	Giesinger; Schneider; Julian Schwizler	Schneider	3:20
7.	"Für dich, für mich"	Giesinger; Schneider	Schneider	4:01
8.	"Die guten Tage strahlen"	Giesinger; Schneider	Schneider	3:27
9.	"Nicht anders gelernt"	Giesinger; Jan Platt; Steffen Graefe	Schneider	3:07
10.	"In Balance"	Giesinger; Schneider	Schneider	3:15
11.	"Vielleicht im nächsten Leben"	Giesinger; Schneider	Jürgens; Schneider	3:22
12.	"Melancholiker"	Giesinger; Schneider	Schneider	3:21
13.	"Der Junge, der rennt"	Giesinger; Alexander Knolle	Schneider; Knolle	3:23
Total length:				44:57

== Charts ==
=== Weekly charts ===
Weekly chart performance for Der Junge, der rennt
Chart (2016–17)	Peak position
Austrian Albums (Ö3 Austria)	41
German Albums (Offizielle Top 100)	17
Swiss Albums (Schweizer Hitparade)	27

=== Year-end charts ===
2016 year-end chart performance for Der Junge, der rennt
Chart (2016)	Position
German Albums (Offizielle Top 100)	71

2017 year-end chart performance for Der Junge, der rennt
Chart (2017)	Position
German Albums (Offizielle Top 100)	46

== Certifications ==
Certifications for Der Junge, der rennt
Region	Certification	Certified units/sales
Germany (BVMI)	Platinum	200,000^{‡}
^{‡} Sales+streaming figures based on certification alone.

== Release history ==
Der Junge, der rennt release history
Region	Date	Format	Label	Ref.
Various	8 April 2016	CD; digital download	Max Giesinger; BMG Rights Management	
