= The Queen's Award for Enterprise: Innovation (Technology) (2002) =

The Queen's Award for Enterprise: Innovation (Technology) (2002) was awarded on 21 April 2002, by Queen Elizabeth II.

== Recipients ==
The following organisations were awarded this year.

- Architectural Plants of Horsham, West Sussex for ‘Architectural Plants’ range of garden plants.
- BAE Systems Avionics Limited, Avionic Systems of Rochester, Kent for Helmet systems for aircrew.
- Vacuum and Exhaust Management Division, BOC Edwards, part of The BOC Group plc of Crawley, West Sussex for High performance vacuum pump for the semiconductor manufacturing industry.
- Beardow & Adams (Adhesives) Limited of Milton Keynes for BAMFutura - advanced hot melt adhesive technology.
- BioInteractions Ltd of Reading, Berkshire for ‘Trillium Biopassive Surface’ (Trademark of Medtronic Inc) - non-thrombogenic and antithrombogenic polymer coating.
- Cambridge Neurotechnology Ltd of Papworth Everard, Cambridge for ‘Actiwatch activity monitoring system’.
- Cintec International Ltd of Newport, for ‘Archtec’ method of masonry bridge reinforcement.
- ClinPhone Group Limited of Nottingham for Electronic trial management solutions - telephone and web-based services for managing global clinical trials.
- ColorMatrix Europe Ltd of Knowsley, Merseyside for Acetaldehyde reducer (additive).
- Cooper Cameron (UK) Limited (Oil-Tool Branch) of Leeds for Offshore wellhead pressure control equipment - ‘SpoolTree’.
- Elekta Oncology Systems Ltd of Crawley, West Sussex for Patient support system for radiotherapy treatment.
- Elementis Chromium of Stockton-on-Tees for CA21 Chromic acid.
- EuroDirect Database Marketing Limited of Bradford for Transforming raw data into valuable marketing intelligence.
- Eurotalk Ltd of London SW6 for Design and production of ‘Talk Now!’ Language Learning software.
- Flexipol Packaging Ltd of Haslingden, Lancashire for ‘Ripp’n’Flow’ sack - reduction of foreign body contamination in the food industry.
- Formpave Limited of Coleford, Gloucestershire for ‘Formpave’ stormwater source control system.
- Fujifilm Electronic Imaging Ltd of Hemel Hempstead, for Hertfordshire Multibeam laser imaging on Luxel F-9000.
- Garnett Farms Engineering Ltd of Knutsford, Cheshire for AG Dispenser - range of machinery for animal bedding cubicles and poultry houses.
- Gifford and Partners of Southampton for ‘Archtec’ method of masonry bridge reinforcement.
- HoldFast Level Crossings Limited of Cheltenham, Gloucestershire for ‘HoldFast’ level crossing system.
- Holset Engineering Company Limited of Huddersfield for Variable geometry turbocharger.
- domnick hunter limited of Gateshead for ‘Maxigas’ - generators for on-site production of industrial nitrogen gas.
- McConnel Limited of Ludlow, Shropshire for ‘McConnel EasyDrive’ system for verge mowing.
- Norfolk Frames Ltd of Marsham, Norfolk for Doors with unique glass fibre design.
- Pama & Co Ltd of Manchester for ‘Plug n Go’ mobile phone portable car kit.
- Paradise Datacom Limited of Witham, Essex for Design of custom ASIC (Application Specific Integrated Circuit).
- Penlon Limited of Abingdon, Oxfordshire for Delta anaesthetic vaporiser.
- Point Source Ltd of Southampton for ‘iFLEX 1000’ - temperature controlled fibre coupled laser.
- R D Trading Ltd t/a RDC of Witham, Essex for End of life computer asset management.
- Rockfield Software Limited of Swansea, Wales for ELFEN discrete element numerical analysis software for the ‘Archtec’ reinforcement system.
- SYR Limited t/a Syr Clean.com of Stourbridge, West Midlands for Integrated floor mopping system.
- Shackerley (Holdings) Group Limited of Chorley, Lancashire for Glass block wall construction and timber dry fit construction system.
- Sophos PLC of Abingdon, Oxfordshire for Anti-virus software.
- Toolroom Technology Limited (TTL) of Aylesbury, Buckinghamshire for Adaptive machining for the gas turbine industry.
- Valiant Technology Ltd of London SW12 for ‘Roamer’ the educational robot.
- Variable Message Signs Limited of Gateshead for ‘Rigel’ LED technology for enhanced optical performance of variable message signs.
- Andrew Wilkes & Associates Limited of Lymington, Hampshire for Telecom site design and planning.
