= M. A. Khan =

Indian politician

Governor of Madhya Pradesh
- In office 1990–1993

Personal details
- Born: 16 June 1920
- Died: 22 April 2001
- Children: Hamid Ali Rao (son)

Kunwar Mahmud Ali Khan (16 June 1920 – 22 April 2001) was an Indian politician from Meerut. He served as the Governor of Madhya Pradesh from 1990 to 1993.

== Early life and education ==
He was born on 16 June 1920, in Jogipura village of Meerut. He was an Advocate by profession and a farmer. He completed a Bachelor of Laws from Meerut College, Meerut, Uttar Pradesh.

He was fluent in Urdu, Persian, Hindi, and English, His family can be traced back to the King Vikramaditya of Ujjain, who later converted to Islam.

== Political career ==
- Governor of Madhya Pradesh (1990–93)
- Member of Uttar Pradesh Legislative Assembly Congress Party Daasna constituency (1957–62)
- Member of Uttar Pradesh Public Service Commission (1968–74)
- Re-entered active politics in 1974
- Active involvement in Lok Nayak Jaya Prakash Narayan Movement (1974–77)
- Detained during Emergency under MISA (June 1975 to January 1977)
- Lok Sabha Member Janata Party from Hapur constituency (1977–80)
- Member of Central Haj Committee
- Member of AMU court
- Member of Government Assurances Committee
- Member of the Consultative Committee on Law, Justice and Company Affairs
- Member of National Language Committee
- Leader of Indian delegation to Russia on Indo-Soviet Friendship Committee
- Deputy Leader of Janata Parliamentary Party in Lok Sabha (1979)
- Member of Janata Party Central Parliamentary Board
- Member of Chandrashekhar-led Janata Party
