= Max Giesinger =

German singer-songwriter and musician

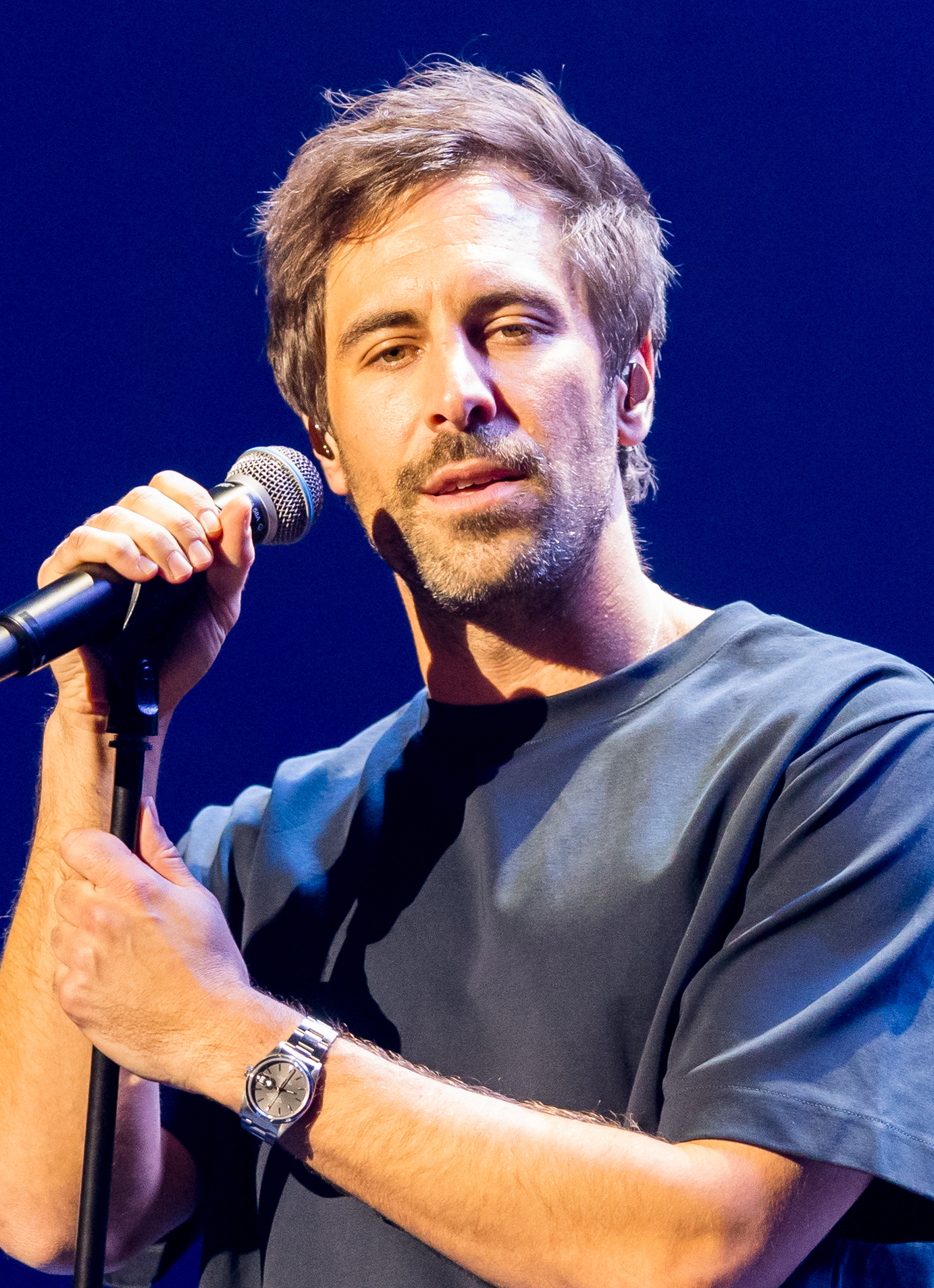
- Giesinger in 2024

Background information
- Born: 3 October 1988 (age 37); Waldbronn, West Germany
- Genres: Pop; pop rock
- Occupations: Singer-songwriter; musician
- Instruments: Vocals; guitar
- Years active: 2012–present
- Label: BMG
- Website: maxgiesinger.de

Max Giesinger (born 3 October 1988) is a German singer-songwriter and musician. He first gained widespread popularity with his single "80 Millionen", placing as high as second position in the German charts. His music is usually labeled as pop and pop-rock.

== Early life ==
Giesinger was born and raised in Waldbronn, Baden-Württemberg. At the age of 13, he played in his first band the Deadly Punks. At the age of 20, he played in the bands Bud Spencer Group, Sovereign Point and as solo project Maxville, and completed 70 performances per year. He completed his high school diploma at the Gymnasium Karlsbad. After graduating from high school, he travelled to Australia and New Zealand where he worked as a street musician for a work-and-travel program.

== Career ==
Following his return to Germany, Giesinger applied to the Baden-Württemberg Pop Academy in Mannheim but was not admitted as a student because he did not pass the entrance examination. He participated in the singing casting show The Voice of Germany in 2011 after being approached by the producers. With the help of his coach Xavier Naidoo, he reached the final of the show on 10 February 2012, in which he finished fourth. His song "Dach der Welt" reached 14th place on the German charts. This was followed by a tour of Germany with performances in twelve cities. In 2013, Giesinger published his EP Unser Sommer and then went on his second tour of Germany.

After separating himself from his label for personal differences, Giesinger launched a crowdfunding campaign in February 2014 to finance his first album. He reached the financing goal within 24 hours. His debut album Laufen lernen was published by Giesinger himself with the help of Rent a Record Company. However, he failed to build on the success of his time at The Voice of Germany.

In April 2016, Giesinger released his second album, Der Junge, der rennt, managing to win label rights with BMG. In addition, the pre-released single "80 Millionen" developed into a radio success and rose into the German charts in April 2016. Two weeks later, the album reached 20th place in the charts in Germany and also rose to the Swiss charts. He recorded a new version of "80 Millionen" for the UEFA Euro 2016, which quickly rose and finished second in the German charts. On 16 September 2016, Giesinger released a second single "Wenn sie tanzt" which reached the top 10 of the German singles chart.

== Discography ==
=== Studio albums ===
List of albums, with selected chart positions and certifications
Title	Album details	Peak chart positions			Certifications
Title	Album details	GER	AUT	SWI	Certifications
Laufen lernen	Released: 20 May 2012; Label: Motor Music; Formats: CD, digital download	—	—	—	
Der Junge, der rennt	Released: 8 April 2016; Label: BMG; Formats: CD, digital download	17	41	27	BVMI: Platinum
Die Reise	Released: 23 November 2018; Label: BMG; Formats: CD, digital download	2	25	14	BVMI: Gold
Vier	Released: 12 November 2021; Label: BMG; Formats: CD, digital download	9	38	23	
Glück auf den Straßen	Released: 26 September 2025; Label: umn Entertainment; Formats: CD, digital download	10	—	56	

=== Singles ===
List of singles, with selected chart positions and parent album
Title	Year	Peak chart positions			Certifications	Album
Title	Year	GER	AUT	SWI	Certifications	Album
"Fix You"	2012	70	—	—		Non-album singles
"Dach der Welt"	2012	14	39	65		Non-album singles
"Unser Sommer"	2013	—	—	—		Laufen lernen
"Irgendwas mit L"	2014	—	—	—		Laufen lernen
"Karlifornien"	2014	—	—	—		Laufen lernen
"Für immer"	2015	—	—	—		Laufen lernen
"80 Millionen"	2016	2	52	53	BVMI: 3× Gold	Der Junge, der rennt
"Wenn sie tanzt"	2016	9	18	16	BVMI: Platinum; IFPI SWI: Gold	Der Junge, der rennt
"Roulette"	2017	—	—	—		Der Junge, der rennt
"Nicht so schnell"	2017	—	—	—		Der Junge, der rennt
"Legenden"	2018	38	—	92		Die Reise
"Zuhause"	2018	—	—	—		Die Reise
"Die Reise"	2019	—	—	—		Die Reise
"Auf das, was da noch kommt" (with Lotte)	2019	40	—	—		Die Reise
"Nie besser als jetzt" (featuring MoTrip)	2020	—	—	—		Non-album single
"Ultraviolett (Akustik-Version)"	2020	—	—	—		Die Reise (Akustik-Version)
"Australien (Akustik-Version)"	2020	—	—	—		Die Reise (Akustik-Version)
"Deine Zweifel"	2021	—	—	—		Vier
"Irgendwann ist jetzt"	2021	64	—	—		Vier
"In meinen Gedanken"	2021	—	—	—		Vier
"Der letzte Tag"	2021	—	—	—		Vier
"Nur kurz glücklich" (with Madeline Juno)	2021	—	—	—		Non-album single
"—" denotes a recording that did not chart or was not released in that territory.

== Awards ==
- 2016: Goldenne Henne 2016 for Newcomer of the Year
- 2016: MTV Europe Music Awards for Best German Act
- 2017: Radio Rogenbogen Awards for the Best Newcomer of 2016
