= Pronunciator =

Language learning resource

Pronunciator is a set of webpages, audio and video files, and mobile apps for learning any of 315 languages. Explanations are available in 144 languages. 1,500 libraries in the US and Canada subscribe and make it available free to their members, including state-wide in Arkansas, Alabama and Wyoming.

== Methods of teaching ==
In each lesson (drop-down menus) students have to learn words in order, and can click to repeat when needed. The software can listen and score pronunciation, and students can record their voice, and compare it to the lesson. Some languages have grammar lessons as well as vocabulary. The "Main course" has "Core Vocabulary" with 100 categories from beginner to intermediate, Powerful Phrases with 50 travel categories, Conversations with 70 conversations, Creating Sentences with 2,223 instructional phrases, 100 verbs conjugated. Grammar notes and phrase analysis are available for all instructional phrase. Some languages have audio downloads of songs, with lyrics, called ProRadio. Some languages have videos with subtitles which let learners loop any phrase in the video. There are lessons to prepare for the US citizenship exam and Canadian citizenship exam.

The recorded voices are native speakers of each language.

== Sample languages taught ==
Afrikaans, Albanian, Amharic, Arabic, Armenian, Azerbaijani, Basque, Belarusian, Bengali, Bulgarian, Catalan, Cebuano, Chinese (Cantonese), Chinese (Mandarin), Chinese (Pinyin), Chinese (Xiang), Croatian, Czech, Danish, Dutch, English (American), English (British), Estonian, Finnish, French, Galician, German, Greek, Gujarati, Haitian Creole, Hebrew, Hiligaynon, Hindi, Hungarian, Icelandic, Indonesian, Irish, Italian, Japanese, Japanese (Romaji), Javanese, Korean, Kurdish, Lao, Latvian, Lithuanian, Macedonian, Malagasy, Malay, Malayalam, Maltese, Marathi, Mongolian, Nepali, Norwegian, Pashto, Persian, Polish, Portuguese (Brazil), Portuguese (Portugal), Romanian, Russian, Serbian, Sindhi, Sinhala, Slovak, Slovene, Somali, Spanish (Latin America), Spanish (Spain), Swahili, Swedish, Tagalog, Tamil, Telugu, Thai, Tibetan, Turkish, Ukrainian, Urdu, Uzbek, Vietnamese, Welsh, Xhosa

== Public reception ==
Pronunciator has been reviewed by Library Journal and was "Highly recommended" with three stars in Choice: Current Reviews for Academic Libraries. It is used to teach undergraduates at major universities, and used for the public at major city libraries. It is cited in reporting on libraries.

== See also ==
- Language education
- Language pedagogy
- List of language self-study programs
