= University of Yaoundé II =

Public university in Cameroon

- Université de Yaoundé II
- Motto: Scientia - Artes - Ingenium
- Type: Public
- Established: 1993; 33 years ago
- Rector: Pr. Laurent Omgba
- Location: Yaounde, Centre, Cameroon; 3.9637°N 11.5866°E
- Campus: Soa (main campus)
- Language: French, English
- Website: www.univ-yaounde2.org

The University of Yaoundé II (UYII; French: Université de Yaoundé II) is a public university in Cameroon, located in the capital Yaoundé. It was formed in 1993 following a university reform that split the country's oldest university, the University of Yaoundé, into two separate entities: the University of Yaoundé I and the University of Yaoundé II.

== Notable alumni ==
- Arnaud Djoubaye Abazène, Minister of Justice of Central African Republic
- Ajomuzu Collette Bekaku, CEO and founder of Cameroon Association of the Protection and Education of the Child
- Odette Melono, Deputy Director-General of the Organisation for the Prohibition of Chemical Weapons, Ambassador of Cameroon to the Netherlands and Luxembourg
- Lambert Sonna Momo, CEO de Global ID, specialized in Multi-View Finger Vein Biometric Authentication
- Solange Yijika, actress
