= Hamid Ali Rao =

Indian diplomat

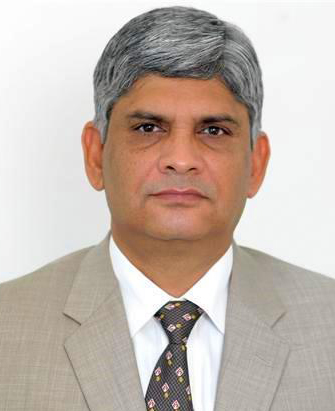

Joint Secretary to the External Affairs Minister
- In office August 2004 – December 2007

India's Permanent Representative to the Conference on Disarmament
- In office 18 December 2007 – 10 September 2011

Indian Ambassador to Saudi Arabia
- In office 24 September 2011 – April 2015

Deputy Director-General of the Organisation for the Prohibition of Chemical Weapons (OPCW)
- In office April 2015 – January 2019

Personal details
- Born: 1954 (age 71–72) Meerut, India
- Spouse: Asiya Hamid Rao
- Children: 2
- Parent: M. A. Khan (father)
- Education: M.A. in Political Science

Hamid Ali Rao (born 1954) is a retired Indian Foreign Service (IFS) officer who served as India's Ambassador to Saudi Arabia from 2011 to 2015, and as Permanent Representative to the Conference on Disarmament in Geneva from 2007 to 2011. He also held the position of Deputy Director-General at the Organisation for the Prohibition of Chemical Weapons (OPCW).

== Early life and education ==
Hamid Ali Rao was born in 1954 in Meerut, Uttar Pradesh, India, to Kunwar Mahmood Ali Khan, a former governor of Madhya Pradesh.

He holds a Master's degree in Political Science and a Bachelor of Laws (LLB).

== Career ==
Rao joined the Indian Foreign Service in 1981. Early in his career, he served as Private Secretary to the External Affairs Minister from 1993 to 1995 and held diplomatic postings in Vienna, Dhaka, and Geneva.

As Joint Secretary in the Ministry of External Affairs, he managed portfolios in Disarmament & International Security Affairs and United Nations Economic and Social Affairs.

From 2007 to 2011, Rao was India's Permanent Representative to the Conference on Disarmament in Geneva, representing India in multilateral disarmament negotiations.

In 2011, he was appointed Ambassador to Saudi Arabia, succeeding Talmiz Ahmad.

During his tenure, Rao addressed consular and labor-welfare issues, notably managing the regularization of 75,000 Indian workers during a 2013 Saudi labor law grace period and resolving passport-related challenges in Jeddah.

In 2015, Rao was appointed as the Deputy Director-General of the OPCW, and during this period he conducted capacity-building visits to countries including Algeria, Mexico, Bangladesh, Russia, and Croatia, and spoke at the 23rd Session of the Conference of States Parties in 2018.

== Personal life ==
Rao is married to Dr. Asiya Hamid Rao, and they have two daughters.
