= Language Reactor =

Language learning browser extension

- Developer: dioco
- Operating system: Cross-platform (via browser)
- Platform: Chrome, Microsoft Edge
- Type: Language learning tool
- License: Freemium
- Website: languagereactor.com

Language Reactor, previously known as Language Learning with Netflix, is a browser extension and website designed to support language acquisition by modifying how subtitles are displayed on Netflix and YouTube streaming platforms.

The tool was initially released under the name Language Learning with Netflix (LLN) but renamed as its scope expanded to support additional platforms and features.

Language Reactor has been featured in several publications such as The Verge, The Guardian, and Lifehacker. The tool has also been discussed in academic and educational sources regarding its impact on vocabulary acquisition and learner engagement.
