= Mondly =

Language learning company

- Mondly Official Logo
- Company type: Language Learning App
- Available in: 41 languages
- List of languages Spanish, American English, British English, French, German, Portuguese, Italian, Russian, Norwegian, Danish, Dutch, Swedish, Arabic, Korean, Japanese, Chinese, Greek, Romanian, Vietnamese, Indonesian, Hindi, Hebrew, Polish, Bulgarian, Ukrainian, Hungarian, Czech, Croatian, Finnish, Persian, Thai, Afrikaans, Turkish, Bengali, Latin, Catalan, Latvian, Lithuanian, Slovak, Tagalog and Urdu.
- Founded: 28 May 2014
- Headquarters: Brașov, Romania
- Area served: Worldwide
- Founders: Alex Iliescu, Tudor Iliescu
- Key people: Alex Iliescu (CEO, co-founder); Tudor Iliescu (Co-founder)
- Industry: Language Learning Software, Self-Study Programs
- Products: Mondly App, Mondly VR, Mondly AR, Mondly Kids
- Services: Language Learning
- Website: https://www.mondly.com/
- Launched: 2014
- Current status: Online
- Native clients on: iOS, Android, Oculus Rift, Web

Mondly is a language learning company that operates a website and a number of free and paid language apps. The company was acquired in May 2022 by the British educational giant Pearson.

Mondly is a freemium language-learning platform using a method that combines vocabulary and phrase learning with speech recognition and chatbot technologies. Mondly is also a pioneer in VR Education, with its launch on Meta Quest, one of the world's top 10 virtual reality apps.

== History ==
Mondly was founded in 2013 by Alexandru Iliescu and Tudor Iliescu in Brașov, Romania.

The company launched the first app in May 2014 on AppStore and on Google Play in June 2015. A year later, in August 2016, launched the first chatbot with speech recognition on both iTunes and Google Play. This was followed in February 2017 with the launch of MondlyVR, a virtual reality language app with speech recognition.

In May 2017, the company released the MondlyKids app for children aged 5 to 12. The following year, in March 2018, the company introduced MondlyAR, the first augmented reality language app with speech recognition. Following a rise in interest in VR education, the company launched Mondly VR on the Oculus Quest store in August 2021.

In the third quarter of 2021, Mondly became the second most downloaded language learning app worldwide.

== Products ==
The company offers four primary products:

- Mondly Languages - a language learning app that integrates chatbot and speech recognition technologies.
- Mondly Kids - a language learning app for toddlers and kids.
- MondlyVR - a virtual reality language learning app, available on Steam and in the Oculus Store.
- MondlyAR - an augmented reality app featuring an avatar teacher that use virtual objects (eg. planets, animals, musical instruments) as teaching tools to engage the user in conversations and provide instant feedback on pronunciation using the chatbot technology.

== Language courses ==
As of 2017, Mondly had courses for 33 languages for beginner, intermediate and advanced users. In 2020, the app added 8 additional languages for a total of 41.

Mondly offers courses in the following 41 languages:

Arabic; Afrikaans; Bengali; Bulgarian; Catalan; Chinese; Czech	Danish; Dutch; American English; British English; French; Finnish; German	Greek; Hebrew; Hindi; Hungarian; Italian; Indonesian; Japanese	Korean; Latin; Latvian; Lithuanian; Norwegian; Persian; Polish	Portuguese; Romanian; Russian; Slovak; Spanish; Swedish; Tagalog	Thai; Turkish; Ukrainian; Urdu; Vietnamese

== Recognition and awards ==
In January 2016, Mondly Languages was named "Best New App" by Apple and a year later it received the FbStart “App of the Year” award for Europe, Middle East & Africa offered by Facebook.

In December 2017, Mondly Languages and MondlyKids were both chosen as "Editors' Choice" in Google Play.

In 2018, Mondly was named a "Cool Vendor" in Consumer Mobile Applications and Bots by Gartner and included in Deloitte’s Fast 50 Rising Stars. Alexandru Iliescu, the CEO and co-founder of Mondly, was also named Founder of the Year at the Central European Startup Awards.

In February 2019, the Mondly founders were awarded the "Emerging Entrepreneur of the Year: Technology & Innovation" prize by Ernst & Young. In July, Mondly was named "Best Online Language Learning Portal” in Germany by the Deutsches Institut für Service-Qualität.

In November 2021, Mondly won the Chairman's Award at the WITSA Global ICT Excellence Awards.
