= Babbel =

Online language learning platform

Babbel GmbH
- Website type: Private
- Available in: List: Danish; Dutch; English; French; German; Indonesian; Italian; Norwegian; Polish; Portuguese; Russian; Spanish; Swedish; Turkish
- Headquarters: Berlin, Germany
- Key people: Markus Witte (CEO), Thomas Holl (Co-Founder), Julie Hansen (CEO Babbel, Inc.)
- Industry: E-learning, online education
- Revenue: €247 million (2022)
- Employees: 1000 globally
- Website: www.babbel.com
- Registration: yes
- Launched: August 2007; 19 years ago
- Current status: Online

Babbel GmbH, operating as Babbel, is a German company operating a subscription-based language learning software and e-learning platform.

With 1000 employees, Babbel is headquartered in Berlin (Babbel GmbH) and has an office in New York City, operating as Babbel Inc. Babbel's app is available for web, iOS and Android offering lessons in 14 languages. The company develops its learning content in-house.

== History ==
The company was founded in August 2007 by Thomas Holl, Toine Diepstraten, Lorenz Heine and Markus Witte. In January 2008, the language learning platform went online with community features as a free beta version.

In March 2013, Babbel acquired San Francisco startup PlaySay Inc. to expand into the United States. As part of the acquisition, PlaySay's founder and CEO joined Babbel as a strategic advisor. Later that year, a third funding round led by Scottish Equity Partners raised another $22 million. Other participants in this round include previous investors Reed Elsevier Ventures, Nokia Growth Partners, and VC Fonds Technology Berlin.

In 2019, co-founder Markus Witte stepped down as CEO and was replaced by Arne Schepker. In March 2020, a works council was elected in the Berlin office.

In March 2022, Babbel provided free access codes to Ukrainian refugees, allowing those with prior knowledge of languages offered by Babbel to learn relevant languages such as German, Polish, and English. In February 2023, Babbel was awarded the "CSR (Corporate Social Responsibility) Silver Anthem Award for Humanitarian Action & Services" for its efforts to help displaced people affected by the Russian invasion of Ukraine. At the time, over 500,000 Ukrainians accessed Babbel courses under the program.

In 2023, Babbel acquired Toucan (a language-learning browser extension). At the time, it had around 1000 full-time employees and freelancers. As of October 2024, Markus Witte has returned as CEO.

== See also ==
- Educational technology
- Language education
- Computer-assisted language learning
- List of language self-study programs
