= Reise Know-How =

German publishing company group

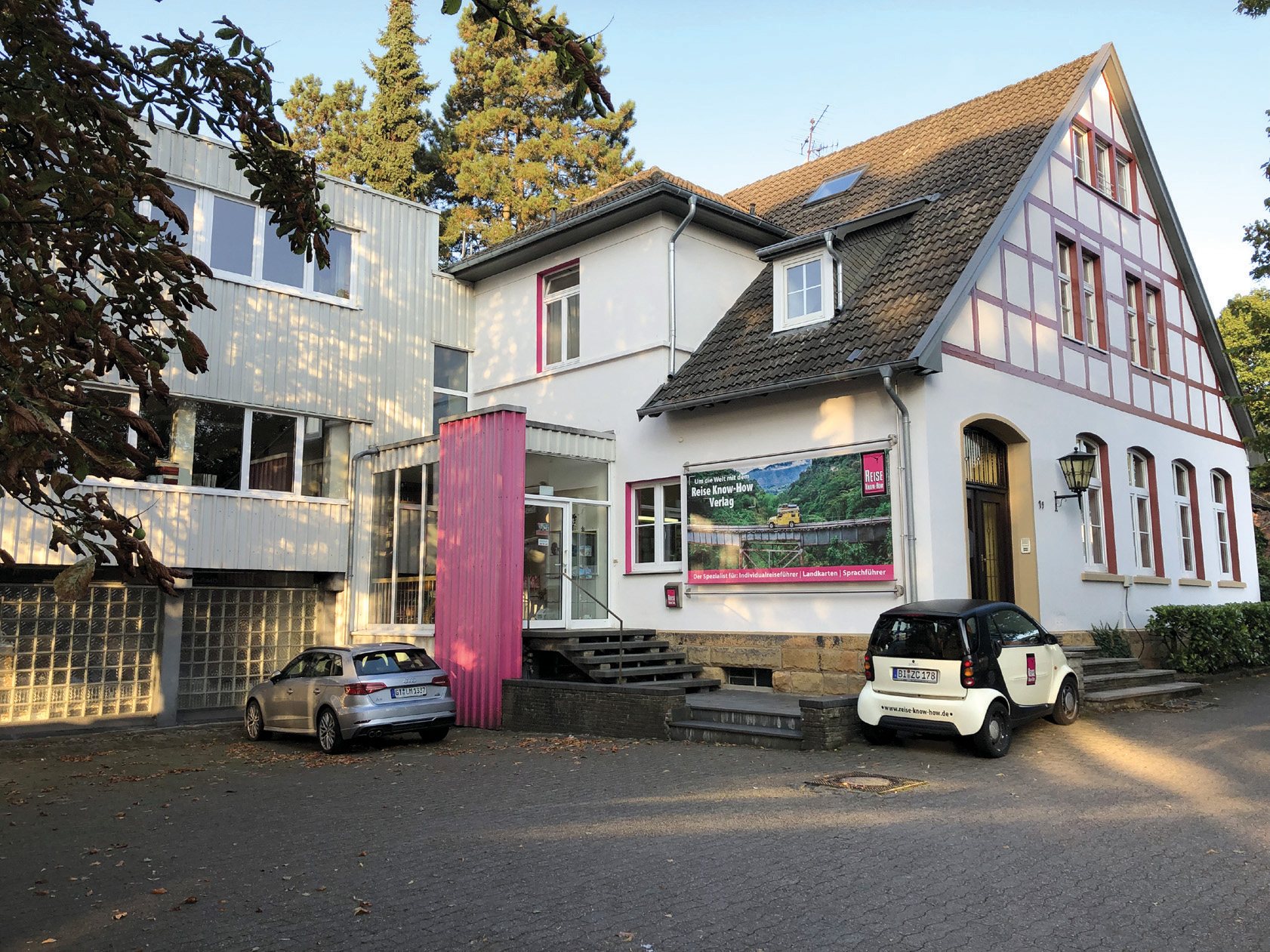
"Peter Rump GbmH" in Bielefeld, a member publishing house affiliated to the Reise Know-How group.

Verlagsgruppe Reise Know-How is a group of German publishing companies that specialize in travel and language books and maps for single travelers, founded in 1985 and based in Bielefeld, North Rhine-Westphalia, Germany. It publishes travel guides for over 250 destinations, language books for over 200 languages, including slang and dialect, and maps for over 100 places, among other publications.

The affiliated record label Reise Know-How Sound publishes a series of records called "soundtrip". It was important to the authors not only to provide travelers with the most detailed and up-to-date information possible, but also to open their eyes to peculiarities and cultural differences and to take the first steps toward "soft tourism." The cultural guides published in the Kulturschock series provide deeper insights into history, culture and mentality. Maps are also published as part of the "world mapping project". The music compilations in the soundtrip series provide an acoustic foretaste of the destination.

== See also ==
- Language education
- List of Language Self-Study Programs
