= Die Reise (album) =

Studio album by Max Giesinger
- Released: 23 November 2018
- Length: 48:19
- Label: BMG

Max Giesinger chronology
Der Junge, der rennt (2016)	Die Reise (2018)	Vier (2021)

Die Reise (transl. The Journey) is the third studio album by German singer Max Giesinger. It was released by BMG Rights Management on 23 November 2018 in German-speaking Europe.

== Track listing ==
No.	Title	Writer(s)	Producer(s)	Length
1.	"Bist du bereit"	Max Giesinger; Steffen Gräf; Julian Schwitzler	David Jürgens	3:23
2.	"Die Reise"	Giesinger; Martin Fliegenschmidt; Jürgens; Ali Zuckowski	Jürgens	3:48
3.	"Legenden"	Giesinger; Fliegenschmidt; Jürgens; Zuckowski	Jürgens	3:44
4.	"Australien"	Giesinger; Jens Schneider; Julian Schwitzler	Schneider	3:16
5.	"Wenn ich leiser bin"	Giesinger; Schneider; Martin Haller	Schneider	4:11
6.	"Zuhause"	Giesinger; Fliegenschmidt; Jürgens; Zuckowski	Jürgens	3:40
7.	"Lieber geh ich"	Giesinger; Schneider; Haller	Schneider	3:51
8.	"Leerer Raum"	Giesinger; Fliegenschmidt; Jürgens; Zuckowski	Jürgens	4:00
9.	"Ultraviolett"	Giesinger; Schneider; Niko Stegmiller	Schneider	3:49
10.	"Sommer"	Giesinger; Fliegenschmidt; Jürgens; Zuckowski	Jürgens	3:21
11.	"Die Ausnahme"	Giesinger; Fliegenschmidt; Jürgens; Zuckowski	Jürgens	3:21
12.	"Rucksack"	Giesinger; Fliegenschmidt; Jürgens; Zuckowski	Jürgens	3:33
13.	"Wir waren hier"	Giesinger; Schneider; Schwitzler	Schneider	4:06

== Charts ==
Chart (2018)	Peak position
Austrian Albums (Ö3 Austria)	25
German Albums (Offizielle Top 100)	2
Swiss Albums (Schweizer Hitparade)	14

== Certifications ==
Region	Certification	Certified units/sales
Germany (BVMI)	Gold	100,000^{‡}
^{‡} Sales+streaming figures based on certification alone.

== Release history ==
Region	Date	Edition	Format	Label
Austria	23 November 2018	Standard	Digital download; CD	BMG Rights Management
Germany	23 November 2018	Standard	Digital download; CD	BMG Rights Management
Switzerland	23 November 2018	Standard	Digital download; CD	BMG Rights Management
