= UCLA Language Materials Project =

The UCLA Language Materials Project (LMP) maintained a web resource about teaching materials for some 150 languages that are less commonly taught in the United States. The project, funded by the U.S. Department of Education, was created in 1992. It is part of the UCLA Center for World Languages. Funding was terminated in 2014 and the Language Materials Project website deactivated.

== Bibliographic database of teaching materials ==
The website provided full bibliographic information for over 7000 items, including textbooks, readers, phrasebooks, grammars, dictionaries, and supplementary materials that are distributed in print, audio, video, web and computerized instruction formats. It offered detailed descriptions of the content and other features of each material, to help users find the most appropriate tools for their individual teaching and learning needs. Items could be located quickly through menus displayed at the top of each webpage, or through an advanced search. The LMP did not sell the materials listed in the database, but did provide information on retailers and distributors where the materials can be obtained.

== Database and guide to authentic materials ==
The website also provided citations of about 1000 Authentic Materials, language materials originally intended for native speakers rather than second-language learners. Because such items reflect current culture and actual language usage, they are much valued as teaching tools. The database presented native-language posters, signs, advertisements, product labels, games, maps, schedules, and brochures that can be downloaded for free from the LMP website. There are also links to selected external websites that offer native-language audio, video, and print resources. The Authentic Materials page provided a guide to using those materials in the classroom, including sample lesson plans.

== Language profiles ==
Each LMP language had its own webpage, providing a language profile, a direct link to the LMP citations for that language, and links to relevant external websites for teachers and students of the language. The profile provided a map, a description of key dialects, grammatical features, relationship to other languages, a linguistic history, and sociolinguistic information.

== Materials reports ==
These reports provided a numeric summary of the categories of materials cited for each language in the database. They were used by publishers and policy makers to assess the U.S. availability of teaching materials for a given language.

== CARLA database ==
A direct link to the University of Minnesota's database of the courses in less commonly taught languages offered by over 2000 schools, colleges and other programs in the U.S. and Canada. CARLA stands for Center for Advanced Research on Language Acquisition.

== CAL database ==
An additional database of teaching materials for less commonly taught languages, produced by the Center for Applied Linguistics in Washington, DC, and hosted by the LMP. It offers brief summaries of materials for languages beyond the 150 in the LMP database.

== Links for language teachers ==
The LMP website offered selected links to language resource centers, professional language teachers' associations, scholarly publications, and distributors of language-teaching materials.

== K-12 language-teaching resources ==
A separate portal for people teaching less commonly taught languages to students in kindergarten through 12th grade. Offerings included a section on curricular frameworks and standards, links to dozens of outside resources for K-12 language teachers, and a year's worth of free lesson plans for teachers to download and adapt to their own classrooms. The lessons were grouped into thematic units (e.g. 10 lessons on school, 5 lessons on likes and dislikes, 15 on friends and relationships), and offer lively activities for learning to communicate in the target language.
