= Busuu =

Language learning platform

Busuu Ltd

- Homepage of Busuu
- Company type: Private
- Website type: Language Learning
- Available in: 14 languages
- List of languages Arabic, Chinese, Dutch, English, French, German, Italian, Japanese, Polish, Portuguese, Russian, Spanish, Turkish and Korean
- Founded: 28 January 2008
- Headquarters: London, United Kingdom
- Country of origin: Spain
- Area served: Worldwide
- Owner: Busuu Online S.L.
- Founders: Bernhard Niesner, Adrian Hilti
- CEO: Bernhard Niesner
- Industry: Online education, Professional certification, Crowdsourcing, Translation
- Services: Language courses
- Employees: ~100
- Parent: Chegg, Inc.
- Website: www.busuu.com
- Commercial: Yes
- Registration: Required (free)
- Users: >100 million users
- Launched: 16 May 2008
- Current status: Online
- Native clients on: Android, iOS, iPadOS

Busuu is a language learning platform on web, Windows iOS and Android that allows users to interact with native speakers. In 2021, Chegg acquired Busuu for $436 million.

== History ==
Busuu was founded in May 2008 by Bernhard Niesner and Adrian Hilti. The company launched with a free version of its website and opened its first office in Madrid. In 2009, Premium membership was introduced to access to all features on the platform and in 2010, the first Busuu mobile app was launched.

Busuu is named after the endangered language Busuu, spoken in Cameroon. According to an ethnological study conducted in the 1980s, only eight people at that time were still able to speak this language. In 2010, Busuu created a short language course to encourage people to learn the Busuu language using Busuu.

After closing a Series A round of 3.5 million euros from PROfounders Capital and private investors in 2012, Busuu further improved the functionalities of the platform and increased its global market share. During that year, the company moved its offices and staff to a London based office. The head office of Busuu has remained in London ever since.

In May 2016, the company launched Busuu for Organisations, the language learning platform for universities and businesses. Using the platform, organisations can give their students or employees access to Busuu Premium. The platform allows organisations to view learner's progress and use of the app over time. Personalised courses have been created for organisations such as Uber. This included lessons about the specific contexts an Uber driver would encounter with their passengers.

In 2016, it was a launch partner for Google Home Assistant, offering voice-activated lessons in Spanish; in 2017, it launched a virtual reality app for learning Spanish, available for the Oculus Gear and Oculus Go, and in 2018, Busuu launched a comprehension test for the Amazon Alexa platform.

On November 29, 2021, education technology company Chegg announced it would acquire Busuu for approximately $436 million (€385 million) with the deal expected to close in early 2022. Busuu has faced repeated criticism from users for what some consider to be its predatory billing practices.

== Concept ==
=== Language courses ===
Busuu incorporates the communicative elements of social learning into self-study language learning. Through its website and mobile apps, Busuu offers free and Premium access to 14 language courses, taught in 15 interface languages.

Busuu offers courses based on CEFR levels A1, A2, B1, B2 and C1. Study material is divided into themed lessons, each based around common conversational scenarios. Lessons contain vocabulary and grammar practice, pronunciation exercises, interactive quizzes and conversational practice with native speakers who are members of the Busuu community.

In 2019, Busuu launched third-party content with lessons featuring videos and articles from The New York Times and The Economist, to allow learners to learn from real-life examples of language use.

Through their partnership with McGraw-Hill Education, learners can receive a level completion certificate between beginner level A1 and intermediate level B2 in English, Spanish, French, German, Italian and Portuguese. The tests focus on dialogue, comprehension and productive skills. Joint certificates with McGraw Hill have been discontinued. Now it is only Busuu who endorses the certificate.

There is free access to all courses, and paid access to Premium features. Grammar instruction, spoken and written conversations, spaced repetition vocabulary training and other features such as Offline Mode, are only available for Premium learners.

=== Community ===
The platform encourages collaborative learning by allowing members to practise their writing and speaking skills with help from native speakers of the language they are learning. All learners correct one another's work. They can converse via asynchronous voice recording or text chat. In this way, every Busuu user is both student of a foreign language and tutor of the languages they can already speak.

== Academic research ==
In 2016, researchers from City University of New York and the University of South Carolina conducted a non-peer reviewed study into the efficacy of Busuu's courses. The results stated that learning a language for 22 hours with Busuu Premium was equivalent to sitting one college semester. The study was refreshed in 2025 and published on the private website of the original lead researcher (by now an assistant professor at University of Maryland).

Later in 2016, Busuu worked with a senior lecturer at The Open University to find out about the behaviour of language learners on the platform. The results showed 82% of Busuu learners confirmed that Busuu helped to improve their language learning.

== See also ==
- Community language learning
- Language education
- List of language self-study programs
