= Alex Mullen (memory athlete) =

Memory athlete

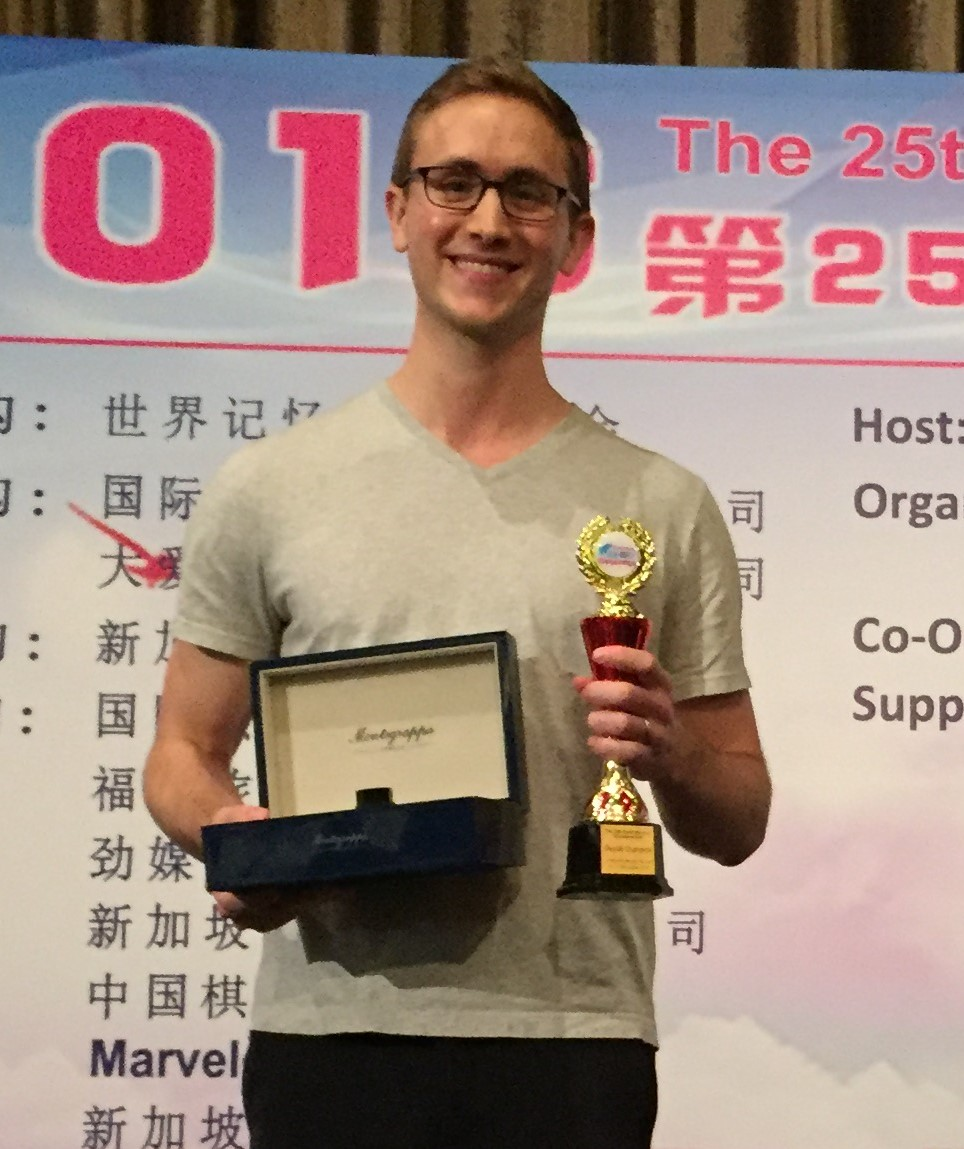
- Mullen at the 2016 World Memory Championship in Singapore

Personal information
- Full name: Alexander Joseph Mullen
- Nationality: American
- Born: 3 March 1992 (age 34) Princeton, New Jersey, United States
- Education: Johns Hopkins University (BS); University of Mississippi (MD)
- Years active: 2014–present
- Spouse: Cathy Chen (m. 2015)
- Website: www.mullenmemory.com

Sport
- Sport: Memory
- Rank: No. 1 (June 2016-2019)

Achievements and titles
- World finals: 1st place (2015, 2016, 2017)
- National finals: 1st place (2016)
- Highest world ranking: No. 1 (June 2016)
- Personal bests: Speed Cards (analog): 15.61 sec (2017); Speed Cards (digital): 52 in 12.33s (2020); 80 Digits: 17.65 sec (2016); 5 min Numbers: 568 digits (2017); 15 min Numbers: 1100 digits (2016); 30 min Numbers: 1933 digits (2016); Historic Dates: 133 dates (2017); 60 min Numbers: 3238 digits (2017)

Alex Mullen (born 3 March 1992) is an American former memory competitor, three-time world memory champion, and physician. The first American to win the world title, he won for three consecutive years the 2015, 2016, and 2017 World Memory Championships and held the IAM world No. 1 ranking from 2016 to 2019. He was also the 2022 and 2023 Memory League World Champion. Along with his wife, he runs Mullen Memory - a nonprofit which "provides free resources exploring memory palaces as learning tools."

== Personal life ==
Mullen was born in Princeton, New Jersey. He grew up in Oxford, Mississippi and attended Oxford High School, where he competed on the varsity swimming and tennis teams. In his senior year, Mullen was a National Merit Finalist and fourth award winner at the Intel International Science and Engineering Fair for a team project with his future wife, Cathy Chen. He attended Johns Hopkins University and studied biomedical engineering and applied mathematics. He received his M.D. from the University of Mississippi School of Medicine in 2019. Both he and his wife received the Jim and Donna Barksdale Scholarship to cover the full cost of attendance of medical school. In 2020, he began a diagnostic radiology residency at the University of Alabama at Birmingham.

== Notable competitions ==
=== 2015 ===
- World Memory Championships (16-18 Dec., Chengdu, China): 1st place overall. Mullen became the tenth individual, and the first American, to win the world championship since its inception in 1991. He also received the title of international grandmaster of memory, the highest title bestowed by the World Memory Sports Council, at this event.

=== 2016 ===
- USA Memory Championship (9 May, Hershey, Pennsylvania): 1st place overall. Mullen became the ninth individual to win the American national championship since its inception in 1998.
- US Open (2–3 July, Los Angeles, California): 1st place overall. With 8,794 total points, Mullen achieved the then-highest total score in memory sports history (taking into account adjustments in scoring standards), giving him the world No. 1 ranking.
- Memoriad (8-10 Nov., Las Vegas, Nevada): gold: speed cards, hour numbers, silver: names and faces, spoken numbers.
- European Open (3-4 Dec., London, UK): 1st place overall. With 9,143 total points, Mullen broke his earlier mark for the then-highest total score.
- World Memory Championships (15-17 Dec., Singapore): 1st place overall.

=== 2017 ===
- World Memory Championships (IAM) (1-3 Dec., Jakarta, Indonesia): 1st place overall. Most world records broken at the event, 4. With 9,061 total points (adjusted), Mullen broke his earlier record for the then-highest total score.

=== 2021 ===
- Pan American Open (Memory League) (15-16 May): 1st place overall. Mullen competed alongside 15 other online qualifiers using the Memory League format, which consists of digital, head-to-head matches composed of shorter disciplines. In the final, Mullen defeated Ryo Kobayashi of Japan.

=== 2022 ===
- Memory League World Championship (16-31 Jan.): 1st place overall. Mullen competed alongside 15 other online qualifiers in the fourth rendition of the Memory League World Championship, first held in 2014 under the name Extreme Memory Tournament. In the final, Mullen defeated 2019 IAM World Memory Champion Andrea Muzii of Italy.

=== 2023 ===
- Memory League World Championship (8-29 Jan.): 1st place overall. Mullen again defeated Andrea Muzii in the final.

== Records ==
Mullen has held world records in 12 different memory sport disciplines, with the majority-minority of them involving the memorization of numbers or playing cards, none of which is standing as of 1st of October 2019 (all of which have gone extinct by now). He is the first person to memorize the order of a deck of playing cards in under 20 seconds at an official competition. He is also the first to memorize more than 3,000 decimal digits in one hour.

== Media appearances ==
Mullen was a two-time contestant on the final season of the Chinese television program The Brain in 2017, defeating his opponent Wang Feng, the 2010 and 2011 World Memory Champion, by accurately recalling the airline routes, departure and arrival locations, and times of 50 flights. He was also a contestant on Superhuman, the American version of The Brain, winning his episode by memorizing a deck of cards flashed onscreen at two cards per second. Mullen has been featured in The New Yorker, BBC, CNN, The Washington Post, Lifehacker, Vital Signs with Dr. Sanjay Gupta, Today, Mic, Guinness World Records, Men's Health, The Guardian, and The New York Times, among others.

== See also ==
- Mnemonist
- Extreme Memory Tournament
- List of Johns Hopkins University people
- List of University of Mississippi alumni
