= 2024 in mind sports =

The following were Mind sports events during 2024 throughout the world.

== Bridge ==
- 2024 WBT Events and Results here.

=== World Bridge Games ===
- October 23 – November 5: 2024 World Bridge Games in (Argentina) Buenos Aires

=== 2024 WBT Events ===
==== Category A ====
- March 18–24: Vanderbilt Teams in (United States) Louisville
  - Winners: Nickell ( (United States) Nick Nickell, (United States) Ralph Katz, (United States) Geoff Hampson, (United States) Eric Greco, (United States) Steve Weinstein, (United States) Robert J. Levin)
- April 15–21: European Winter Transnational Teams in (France) Alpe d'Huez
  - Winners: Zimmermann ( (Netherlands) Sjoert Brink, (Netherlands) Bas Drijver, (Poland) Jacek Kalita, (Poland) Michał Klukowski, (Poland) Michał Nowosadzki, (Switzerland) Pierre Zimmermann)
- July 22–28: Spingold Teams in (Canada) Toronto
- November 29 – December 5: Soloway Teams in (United States) Las Vegas
- December 6–8: Reisinger Teams in (United States) Las Vegas

==== Category B ====
- January 25–28: Gold Coast Teams in (Australia) Gold Coast
  - Winners: WARE ( (Republic of Ireland) Hugh McGann & (Australia) Matthew Thomson, (New Zealand) Tom Jacob & (New Zealand) Brian Mace, (Australia) Pete Hollands & (New Zealand) Michael Ware)
- March 23–24: Jacoby Swiss Teams in (United States) Louisville
  - Winners: Goodman ( (Italy) Giovanni Donati & (Italy) Giacomo Percario, (United States) Andy Goodman & (United States) Mike Passell, (Netherlands) Simon de Wijs & (Netherlands) Bauke Muller)
- April 8–13: S American Transnational Teams in (Colombia) Cali
- April 17–21: European Winter Transnational BAM in (France) Alpe d'Huez
- May 3–7: Spring Foursomes in (England) Bristol
- July 26–28: Roth Swiss Teams in (Canada) Toronto
- July 27 – August 1: Chairman's Cup Teams in (Sweden) Örebro
- September 16–21: HCL International Teams in (India) Delhi
- September 27–29: Vilnius Cup in (Lithuania) Vilnius

==== Category C ====
- January 25–28: Reykjavík Teams in (Iceland) Reykjavík
  - Winners: Apres- Bridge Champs ( (Denmark) Dennis Bilde & (Denmark) Martin Schaltz, (Denmark) Dorthe Bilde & (Denmark) Morten Bilde, (Germany) Sabine Auken & (Germany) Roy Welland)
- May 20–27: APBF Congress Open Teams in (Thailand) Bangkok
- May 24–26: Marit Sveås International Pairs in (Norway) Bodø
- December 3–5: Kaplan Pairs in (United States) Las Vegas
- December 6–8: Swiss Teams in (United States) Las Vegas

==== Category D ====
- January 6–8: Asahi Shimbun Cup in (Japan) Tokyo
  - Winners: KAKU HIROSHI ( (Japan) Takahiko Hirata & (Japan) Koji Ito, (Japan) Hiroshi Kaku & (Japan) Masaaki Takayama)
- January 25–28: Reykjavík Pairs in (Iceland) Reykjavík
  - Winners: (Denmark) Dennis Bilde & (Denmark) Martin Schaltz
- February 18–19: Gold Coast Pairs in (Australia) Gold Coast
  - Winners: (Australia) Ella Jacob & (Australia) Phil Markey
- March 21–22: Silodor Pairs in (United States) Louisville
  - Winners: (Poland) Wojciech Gaweł & (Poland) Rafał Jagniewski
- May 22–26: Contra Cup in (Romania) Bucharest
- July 24–25: Wernher Pairs in (Canada) Toronto
- September 6–8: BK Istanbul Open in (Turkey) Istanbul
- November 7–16: Red Sea Festival Open Pairs in (Israel) Eilat

== Draughts ==
- World Draughts Federation Calendar here.

=== International draughts ===
==== World Cup ====
- January 19–27: Open International de Ouaga in (Burkina Faso) Ouagadougou
  - Winner: (Latvia) Guntis Valneris
- April 20–27: Flevoland Open in (Netherlands) Kraggenburg
  - Winner: (Latvia) Guntis Valneris
- June 30 – July 6: Riga Open in (Latvia) Riga
- December 9–15: Polish Open in (Poland) Julinek

==== World & Continental Championships ====
- April 9–21: Asian Championship in (Uzbekistan) Tashkent
  - Classic Draughts-64 - Open Winner: (Uzbekistan) Laziz Muraliyev
- May 1–9: 2024 World Team Draughts Championships in (Portugal) Albufeira
- June 2–10: European Championship Classic, Blitz and Rapid in (Italy) Chianciano Terme
- October 27 – November 4: World Championship Youth in (Poland) Szklarska Poręba
- December 7: World Championship Rapid in (Poland) Julinek
- December 8: World Championship Blitz in (Poland) Julinek

==== Other Tournaments ====
- January 9–18: Le Grand Tournoi de Dakar in (Senegal) Dakar
  - Winner: (Cameroon) Jean Marc Ndjofang
- March 9–10: XXVII Cup City of Verona in (Italy) Verona
  - Winner: (Italy) Alessio Scaggiante
- March 18–24: XIX Championship of Domican Republic in (Dominican Republic) Azua
  - Winner: (Dominican Republic) Oliver Nuñez
- March 29–31: Nõmme Kevad in (Estonia) Tallinn
- April 5–13: 63rd PAMDCC San Jose 2024 in (Costa Rica) San Jose
  - Winner: (Brazil) Allan Igor Moreno Silva
- April 22–28: Open international de Bourges 2024 in (France) Bourges
  - Winner: (Netherlands) Leopold Sekongo
- May 18–28: 25th Salou Open in (Spain) Salou
- July 14–20: RotterDamsOpen 2024 in (Netherlands) Rotterdam
- July 21–27: Nijmegen Open in (Netherlands) Nijmegen
- August 1–7: La Habana Open in (Cuba) Havana
- August 12–17: Hoogeveen Open in (Netherlands) Hoogeveen
- August 19–25: 44th Golden Prague in (Czech Republic) Prague
- September 15–21: Curaçao Open in Willemstad
- November 16–24: Radj Narain Srefidensi Open 2024 in (Suriname) Paramaribo
- November 16–22: World Cup 7 in TBD

=== English draughts ===
==== WTM Independent Match ====
- January 15–18: WTM, Alex Holmes - Alex Moiseyev in (United States) Archdale
- April 18–27: WTM, Alex Moiseyev - Sergio Scarpetta in (United States) Petal
- June 23–28: WTM, Melikaya Nonyukela - Matteo Bernini in (United States) Petal

==== World Cup ====
- May 17–19: 1st stage - Italian Open in Italy
- July 7–10: 2nd stage - Barbados Open in Barbados
- August 5–9: 3rd stage - US Open in (United States) Lebanon
- September 16–20: 4th stage - British Open in United Kingdom
- September 21–22: 5th stage - German Open in Germany
- October 12–13: 6th stage - Czech Open in Czech Republic
- October 26–28: 7th stage - Irish Open in Ireland
- December 29: 9th stage - Uganda in Uganda

==== World Championships ====
- September 23: World Blitz - 3mins + 2 seconds in (Germany) Korbach
- September 24–27: World Qualifier Tournament in (Germany) Korbach
- September 24–27: World Women Championship in (Germany) Korbach
- September 24–27: World Youth Championship in (Germany) Korbach

==== Other Tournaments ====
- February 24–25: Kildare Open in (Republic of Ireland) Naas
- March 8–9: Tennessee Open in (United States) Lebanon
- March 17: Florida Open in (United States) Hollywood
- April 4–6: Francis McNally-incorporating No. Ireland Op. in (Northern Ireland) Cookstown
- April 20–21: Illinois Open in (United States) Marion
- April 27–28: Inishowen Open (Tony McAleer Memorial) in (Republic of Ireland) Moville
- May 1–31: Missouri / District 7 in (United States) St. Joseph
- May 1–31: Mississippi Men's Open in (United States) Petal
- May 17–18: North Carolina Open in (United States) Archdale
- June 1–30: Sammy Cohen in (England) Warrington
- June 1–30: Indiana Checkers Meet 2024 in (United States) Shipshewana
- June 1–30: New England / District 1 in (United States) Medfield
- July 1–5: Italy vs. USA International Match in (United States) Vidor
- August 1–31: Mid-Ohio / Ohio State in (United States) Fredericksburg
- August 2–3: Southern Open in (United States) Lebanon
- September 20–21: Virginia Open / District 4 in (United States) Collinsville
- October 1–31: Illinois 101 Open in (United States) Marion
- November 15–17: East of Scotland in Inverness
- December 12–13: Kenya Open Tournament in Nairobi

=== Portuguese/Spanish draughts ===
==== World Championships ====
- May 8–13: World Championship in Portuguese/Spanish Draughts in (Portugal) Albufeira
  - Winner: (Morocco) Said Quindar

=== Italian draughts ===
==== World Championships ====
- April 20–21: Qualifying Tournament (Challenge) for the 1st World Championship of Italian Draughts in (Italy) Rome
  - Winner: (Italy) Damiano Sciuto
- April 19–28: 1st World Championship of Italian Draughts in (Italy) Rome
  - Winner: (Italy) Damiano Sciuto

== Memory sport ==
- Memory League World Tour website here.

=== Memory League World Tour ===
- January: 2024 World Memory Championships (end of 2023/24 season)
  - Winner: (United States) Alex Mullen

==== Season 2024/2025 ====
- February 11 – April 28: League Season 20
  - Winner: (United States) Alex Mullen
- May 18–19: Pan American Open
- May 19 – August 4: League Season 21
- September 7–8: Asian-Oceanian Open
- September 8 – December 15: League Season 22
- November 9–10: African-European Open
- January 5 – February 2: 2025 World Memory Championships (end of 2024/25 season)

== Poker ==
=== 2024 World Series of Poker ===
- July 3–17: 2024 MAIN EVENT No-Limit Hold'em World Championship in (United States) Las Vegas

=== 2024 European Poker Tour ===
- February 14–25: 2024 EPT Paris in (France) Paris
  - Winner: (United Kingdom) Barny Boatman
- April 24 – May 4: 2024 EPT Monte-Carlo in (Monaco) Monte Carlo
  - Winner: (Netherlands) Derk van Luijk
- August 26 – September 8: 2024 EPT Barcelona in (Spain) Barcelona
- October 9–20: 2024 EPT Cyprus in Kyrenia
- December 4–15: 2024 EPT Prague in (Czech Republic) Prague

== Puzzle ==
- World Puzzle Federation 2024 Calendar here.

=== World Championships ===
- September 17–22: 2024 World Jigsaw Puzzle Championships in (Spain) Valladolid
- October 13–20: 2024 World Puzzle Championships in (China) Beijing

=== Puzzle GP ===
- February 2–5: 1st round in Serbia
  - Winner: (Japan) Ken Endo
- March 1–4: 2nd round in Germany
  - Winner: (Japan) Ken Endo
- March 29 – April 1: 3rd round in Hungary
  - Winner: (China) Cai Ji
- April 26–29: 4th round in Switzerland
  - Winner: (Japan) Ken Endo
- May 24–27: 5th round in United States
- June 21–24: 6th round in Bulgaria
- July 19–22: 7th round in South Korea
- August 16–19: 8th round in Croatia

== Scrabble ==
- WESPA Tournament Calendar here.
- FFSc - Fédération Française de Scrabble Calendar here.

=== English-language Scrabble ===
- July 27–31: Word Cup in (United States) Albuquerque

=== French-language Scrabble ===
- July 6–14: World Championships in (France) Montauban

== Speedcubing ==
- Full 2024 WCA Calendar here.

=== World & Continental Championships ===
- July 18–21: 2024 Rubik's WCA North American Championship in (United States) Minneapolis
- July 25–28: 2024 Rubik's WCA European Championship in (Spain) Pamplona
- December 19–22: 2024 WCA Oceanic Championship in (Australia) Perth

== Sudoku ==
- World Puzzle Federation 2024 Calendar here.

=== World Championships ===
- October 13–20: 2024 World Sudoku Championship in (China) Beijing

=== Sudoku GP ===
- January 19–21: 1st round in Netherlands
  - Winner: (China) Dai Tantan
- February 23–28: 2nd round in France
  - Winner: (China) Dai Tantan
- March 15–18: 3rd round in Slovakia
  - Winner: (China) Dai Tantan
- April 12–15: 4th round in China
  - Winner: (China) Dai Tantan
- May 10–13: 5th round in Czech Republic
  - Winner: (China) Dai Tantan
- June 7–10: 6th round in Turkey
  - Winner: (Estonia) Tiit Vunk
- July 5–7: 7th round in India
  - Winner: (Estonia) Tiit Vunk
- August 2–5: 8th round in Germany
  - Winner: (China) Dai Tantan
