= The Brain (game show) =

2014 Chinese game show

- Also known as: Super Brain
- Chinese: 最强大脑; pinyin: Zùiqiáng Dànǎo
- Created by: Endemol Shine Germany in association with Jiangsu Television
- Developed by: Jiangsu TV
- Creative director: Peijie Wang
- Presented by: Jiang Changjian
- Starring: Wei Kunlin; Tao Ching-Ying
- Opening theme: We win as one
- Ending theme: We win as one
- Country of origin: China
- Original languages: Chinese; German; English; Japanese
- No. of seasons: 13
- No. of episodes: Regular: 50; Reformatted show: 73

Production
- Producer: Wang Gang
- Production locations: China: Headquarters of Jiangsu Television and Nanjing International Exhibition Center, Nanjing
- Running time: 120
- Production companies: Banijay Entertainment S.A., Jiangsu Television

Original release
- Network: Jiangsu TV
- Release: 3 January 2014 – present

The Brain (Chinese: 最强大脑; pinyin: Zùiqiáng Dànǎo lit. "The Most Powerful Brain") is a Chinese reality and talent show starting in 2014, originating from Germany. The show aims to find people with exceptional brainpower. It is produced under Banijay Entertainment. In 2018, the series was rebooted as The Brain: Burn Your Brain, featuring weekly puzzle-based challenges for teens and adults. It focused on mental skills over prizes.

== Overview and format ==
=== Seasons 1 and 2 ===
==== Period One: Qualifier Rounds ====
A contestant with special skills (not necessarily brainpower or mental skills) comes to the stage and announces what their "special" challenge is going to be. Each judge (except Dr. Wei) then gives a score between 0 and 5 based on how difficult they believe the challenge to be. The 3 judges' scores will then be added together to give the total preliminary score (between 0 and 15).

The contestant then completes their challenge. If they are successful, Dr. Wei gives a score between 1 and 10 based on the challenge's actual level of difficulty.

If the final score (the product of the judges' scores and Dr. Wei's score) is more than 80 points, the contestant qualifies for the next round. If Dr. Wei gives a full 10 points, the contestant automatically qualifies for the next round. If the final score is below 80, the contestant is eliminated from the show. Usually, Dr. Wei will give an explanation of his score, regardless of whether the contestant succeeds or is eliminated.

==== Period Two: Elimination Round ====
The contestants who received a full 10 points from Dr. Wei in Period One are exempt from elimination.

Before a challenger starts their brainpower-based challenge, they must choose a contestant who is already qualified to challenge. If the challenger does not state a specific qualified contestant they want to challenge, it will be seen as a challenge to all the qualified contestants.

If the challenger chooses only one qualified contestant, and they score higher than the contestant being challenged, the challenger qualifies. However, if their score is less than the qualified contestant, they are eliminated from the show. If the case of a tie occurs, Dr. Wei will ultimately decide who qualifies.

If the challenger wants to challenge all the qualified contestants, their score must be higher than the lowest score of the qualified contestants. If the challenger's score is higher than the lowest score of the already qualified contestants, the qualified contestants with scores below the challenger will face elimination by Dr. Wei's choice. If the challenger fails to reach the lowest qualified contestant score, they are eliminated from the show.

After Episode 9, China had found their 12 qualified contestants, who formed their team for international episodes.

==== Period Three: Challenges ====
This period consists of challenges between the Chinese show's greatest contestants and the ones in the other international versions (see below).

Each team has four members, participating in one-on-one competitions between team China and a foreign "high-skilled" team. Each team member plays one competition, and the country who wins the most competitions is the winner. In the event of a tie, the four judges (Wei Kunlin, Robert Desimone, Konrad Kording and Bernard Balleine) decide who wins the competition based on whose competition was the most difficult.

In Season 1, Wei, Robert, Konrad and Bernard were all experts of neuroscience. Wei Kunlin is the associate professor of the Department of Psychology in Peking University, the Doctor of Motion Control at University of Pennsylvania; Robert Desimone is National Academy of Sciences Award and Golden Brain Award winner, the Professor of the Department of Brain and Cognitive Sciences of Massachusetts Institute of Technology; Konrad Kording is the associate professor of Northwestern University; Bernard Balleine is Honorary Fellow of Australia, the Director of Laboratory of Neurobehavioral Sciences of Institute for Brain and Mental in University of Sydney.

===== Full Schedule of Period Three =====
- Home Team: China

Date	Guest team
Season One (2014)
14 March 2014	Italy
21 March 2014	Spain
28 March 2014	Germany
Season Two (2015)
6 March 2015	Germany
13 March 2015	Japan
20 March 2015	United Kingdom
27 March 2015	United States
Season Three (2016)
March 2016	Germany

=== Season 3 ===
==== Phase 1: Captain selection ====
In the premiere episode of Season 3, eight contestants from previous seasons will play head-to-head in four different competitions. Four winners will be allocated to the third phase, or the international competitions, as the captains.

==== Phase 2: International competitions ====
A team of contestants from China will play head-to-head against a foreign team. Rules remain the same as the competitions in earlier seasons. The competition schedule will be shown as the following:

Transmission time	Home team	Captain	Guest team	Captain
March 4, 2016	China	Li Wei	Germany	Simon Reinhard
March 11, 2016	China	Roy Lam	United Kingdom	Ben Pridmore
March 18, 2016	China	Wang Yuheng	Japan	Rinne Tsujikubo
March 25, 2016	China	Jia Liping; Wang Yinghao	International X-team	Feliks Zemdegs; Gianfranco Huanqui

Only the winning team every week can select one contestant from their national team to the next phase - the season final in April.

==== Phase 3: Season final ====
The advisory judge will nominate one contestant from those who have won the head-to-heads in the winning team at the end of each competition, as one of the four finalists. However, due to the fact that the third match between China and Japan ended with a tie, Robert Desimone nominated one contestant from both of the teams, meaning there would be five finalists in all. But Chen Ranran decided to withdraw, meaning the remaining four finalists would play as individuals in the final.

Each of the four finalists will take on the final challenge for them in the season. This challenge is based on their strengths in mental techniques, and it will be extremely harder than those they have been played earlier in the show. Regardless of the outcomes of the challenges, a panel of four experts (Wei Kunlin and three advisory judges from the head-to-heads) will all rate the challenge and explain it scientifically, as Wei Kunlin usually did earlier in the series. The contestant with the highest combined score is entitled the Grand Champion.

=== Season 4: Human vs Supercomputer ===
The entire season four (2017 season) is based on the concept "Human vs. Supercomputer". Xiao Du, as an avatar of the Baidu AI system, was recognised as a special contestant. However, if Xiao Du defeated any two human contestants on their nominated challenges, Xiao Du would be directly qualified as a finalist, so it would have been possible that there would be a non-human grand champion of the entire season. The competition structure was slightly different from the 2016 season.

==== Phase 1: Qualification ====
Similar to the previous season's second phase, contestants have to achieve 80 points by the panel's decisions. One of the members of "The Brain's Hall of Fame" will join the judging panel, in order to select the best contestants. However, contestants cannot request head-to-heads against those who has already qualified until the next round.

"The Brain's Hall of Fame" consists of the contestants who successfully performed in the previous three seasons. As the previous season's grand champion, Chen Zhiqiang is guaranteed as a finalist to defend his title. If the contestant fail to qualify, the "Hall of Fame" may challenge the judging panel, but the decision must be unanimous in order to qualify. Should even one of the members did not challenge the judges, the contestant would be eliminated. As always, if the contestant failed to complete his or her challenge, he or she would be eliminated, cannot be qualified.

Also, there would be a special sudoku contest and mental calculation head-to-head competition, since there were no panellists in "The Brain's Hall of Fame" who specialise in either of these fields. They along with other panellists in the "Hall of Fame" who didn't have their nominated opponents would be straightly qualified for the third phase, in order to play head-to-head with international panellists.

==== Head-to-head ====
In the second half of each episode, one member of "The Brain's Hall of Fame" will be nominated for the episode's head-to-head challenge against Xiao Du. To be fair, the details of their games would not be revealed to both the human contestants and Xiao Du itself before the recording of the show.

If there's a little time left (not enough due to regulations), it would be broadcast as a separate segment out of the regular show.

==== Special contests ====
In Episodes 4 and 5, there were special contests based on speedcubing.

===== Auditions =====
Starting from around 100 contestants, a non-broadcast audition was introduced, with contestants failed to solve a classic Rubik's Cube in a definite time limit were eliminated in first two rounds (e.g. in the speed solving round, 15 seconds in the first round, 12 seconds in the second), and the first six contestants to solve the third cube went on to the televised knockouts.

===== Last Man Standing =====
- Speed: In the televised knockouts, starting from the third round, the contestant with the longest cumulative time or committed a foul would be eliminated. The final two contestants play a best-of-five final to determine the winner that went through to Phase 2. Before each round, contestants may have 10 seconds to inspect the puzzle. Standard rules of speedcubing apply in each round.
- Blindfolded: In the televised selection, starting with six contestants, they needed to solve three standard Rubik's cube blindfolded. Standard rules of speedcubing apply. Only the best of three rounds will be taken into account, while the two contestants with the longest time would be eliminated. Then the four remaining contestants repeated the previous round, with only two rounds in the following elimination round. The final two contestants then played a sudden death final to determine the winner that went through to next phase.

==== Odd One Out ====
Since there was a contestant who specialise in mathematics and logic in Episode 5, there would be another head-to-head game to determine the only qualifier in the following episode, based on memory. Whoever won the "Odd One Out" game would be able to play against the chosen "Hall of Fame" panellist.

==== Phase 2: Knockout ====
Qualified contestants in the previous phase will take on one of the members in the Hall of Fame under a head-to-head challenge designed by the production team. The winners will advance to the international challenges, while the losers are eliminated. Contestants cannot choose Xiao Du as the opponent until they win their head-to-heads.

==== Phase 3: China vs The World ====
Panellists from "The Brain's Hall of Fame" (as China) will play head-to-head games against one of the panellists from the panel The World. The World consists of nine contestants who were believed to be the best in their respective mental specialists, or from other international versions of The Brain.

After all the head-to-head games, regardless of the outcomes, Dr. Wei Kunlin and Prof. Robert Desimone will nominate one contestant from each of the two panels to proceed to the final along with the returning grand champion Chen Zhiqiang and Xiao Du.

Confirmed panellists from The World:

- Alex Mullen, 2-time winner of World Memory Championships, champion of USA Memory Championship 2016
- Yanjaa Wintersoul, #1 Female Memory Champion of the world and International Grandmaster of Memory World Memory Championships 2015
- Jonas von Essen, returning from the previous season, 2-time winner of World Memory Championships, champion of Swedish Memory Championship 2014
- Kota Morinishi, 2-time World Sudoku Championship winner, 7-time WSC veteran for Japan
- Hiroaki Tsuchiya, returning from the 2016 season (finalist of the 2016 contest), Japan Mental Calculation champion
- Marvin Wallonius, 2nd place overall in World Memory Championships 2015, currently holding three world records [5 minute (decimal) numbers, 15 minute abstract images, 30 minute binary numbers]
- Johannes Zhou Zhang-wei, junior champion of South German Memory Championship 2013
- Alisa Kellner, International Grandmaster of Memory, winner of the 2016 edition of Deutschlands Superhirn, the original German version of The Brain
- Sylvain Arnoux, visual identification specialist; winner of Les Extra-ordinaires, the French version of The Brain

==== Phase 4: The "Last Ever" Battle ====
After all the nominations and competitions, two contestants nominated by scientific judges (acting as team leaders) along with returning grand champion Chen Zhiqiang will play games against Xiao Du for the last time of the series. However, they will work together as a team, instead of playing against each other.

After all the games, the judging panel will cast the deciding result and nominate the newest and last ever grand champion of The Brain.

Finalists:

- Chen Zhiqiang, the returning grand champion of The Brain
- Huang Zheng, stereoscopic vision specialist
- Alex Mullen, memory specialist, 2-time World Memory Champion
- Xiao Du, avatar of Baidu AI

== Summary of Season One ==
=== Period One's Qualified Contestants by Episode ===
==== Episode 1 ====
This episode aired at 22:00 (Beijing Time) on January 3, 2014. This episode's guests were Li Yanhong and Jay Chou.

Name	Total Score	Challenge Formation
Zheng Caiqian	112 pts.	Find the tile which has changed color from two walls that each contain 2,500 Rubik's Cubes.
Miki Yuk Kuen Lee	88 pts.	Find the face that is synthesized by mixing two human faces.

==== Episode 2 ====
This episode aired at 22:00 (Beijing Time) on January 10, 2014.

Name	Total Score	Challenge Formation
Yang Wanli	84 pts.	Find the dog by correctly identifying the markings, given a picture of a section of the chosen dog's body.
Ge Yunlin	84 pts.	Add up the numbers on the screen (no more than 4-digits).
Wu Tiansheng	135 pts.	Given a wall of fingerprints, identify which fingerprint belongs to which audience member.

==== Episode 3 ====
This episode aired at 22:00 (Beijing Time) on January 17, 2014.

Name	Total Score	Challenge Formation
Hu Xiaoling	88 pts.	Complete the Crossword using the 40 given words.
Zhou Wei	150 pts.	Calculate the involution and square roots.

==== Episode 4 ====
This episode aired at 22:00 (Beijing Time) on January 24, 2014.

Name	Total Score	Challenge Formation
Jia Liping	80 pts.	Solve two Rubik's Cubes whilst blindfolded, underwater, in a single breath.
Ai Xiaowa	84 pts.	Identify an object, whilst blindfolded, only by breathing on it.

==== Episode 5 ====
This episode aired at 22:00 (Beijing Time) on February 7, 2014. Tao Ching-Ying was replaced by Zhang Ziyi for this episode.

Name	Total Score	Challenge Formation
Li Yong	112 pts.	Identify the egg chosen by Li Yongbo.
Wang Feng	112 pts.	Identify the selected car model's door and its key.

Note: "Wang Feng" in this episode is not the singer, but a 24-year-old writer in Beijing; "Li Yong" is a 50-year-old man is currently living in Henan Province, not the former CCTV television host.

==== Episode 6 ====
This episode aired at 22:00 (Beijing Time) on February 14, 2014.

Name	Total Score	Challenge Formation
Rao Shunhan	112 pts.	Random members of the audience choose 30 toys, and the contestant must calculate the total before the scanner does.
Ni Ziqiang	84 pts.	Correctly identify and match up 32 pairs of identical twins from memory.

==== Episode 7 ====
This episode aired at 22:00 (Beijing Time) on February 21, 2014. This is the final episode of Period 1.

Name	Total Score	Challenge Formation
Huang Jindong	112 pts.	Memorize a set of QR codes within a given time, and correctly answer the phone number associated with a given QR code. (2 Rounds)

=== Period Two's Qualified and Eliminated Formerly-qualified Contestants by Episode ===
==== Episode 8 ====
This episode aired at 22:00 (Beijing Time) on February 28, 2014. Jay Chou is back as the guest.

Name	Total Score	Challenge Formation
Sun Cheran	112 pts.	Playing Sudoku with back to the screen, both the 9 numbers and colors on the line and 3x3 grid couldn't be used more than once.

Eliminations in this episode: Ge Yunlin, Hu Xiaoling.

==== Episode 9 ====
This episode aired at 22:00 (Beijing Time) on March 7, 2014. Meng Fei and Ning Caishen, the host and regular guest of Fei Cheng Wu Rao, a show currently airing every weekend on Jiangsu Television, were the guests. What's more, Ning replaced Liang Dong in this episode.

Name	Total Score	Challenge Formation
Li Yunlong	120 pts.	Memorizing_{(within one minute)} and guiding the guest Ning Caishen across the flyover containing a certain sequence of "traps."
Liu Hongzhi	126 pts.	Memorize the password pictures of 100 new mobile phones only once, and unlock the chosen two phones.
Yang Guanxin	117 pts.	Given a wall of faces synthesized from any 2 faces of 60 Korean ladies, find the two faces from which the 'mixed' face was synthesized from.

Eliminations in this episode: Rao Shunhan, Yang Wanli, Li Yong, Miki Yuk Kuen Lee.

=== Brief Report to Period Three by Episode ===
==== Episode 10 ====
This episode aired at 22:00 (Beijing Time, 14:00 in London, UK, 9:00 in New York City, USA) on March 14, 2014. The foreign contestants are from Italy, and all of those are winners of Superbrain - Le Supermenti(the Italian distribution of The Brain, running on Rai 1).

This episode's guest is Lin Dan, a world-famous Chinese badminton athlete and the advised judge is Robert Desimone, the Director of the McGovern Institute for Brain Research at Massachusetts Institute of Technology.

Round No.	China	Competition Formation	Result	Italy
1	Zheng Caiqian	Find the changed tile colors between two walls, each containing 3,500 Rubik's Cubes (rectangles of 4 meters by 3 meters).	Zheng	Franco Gengotti
2	Yang Guanxin	Calculate the capacity of water in the glass based on the sound of hitting the glass.	Pellegrini	Marco Pellegrini
3	Li Yunlong	Place the 102 model brides and bridegrooms in the correct order based on memory.	Li	Andrea La Torre
4	Wu Tiansheng	Write down the correct pyramid of 15 numbered paper cups based on memory in a certain time (decided by contestant).	Wu	Matteo Salvo

- Round 1: Franco tried to find the differences set by Zheng Caiqian 4 times, but he failed again and again in the 8-minute time limit; Zheng Caiqian's turn goes well, he found a difference at 6 minutes and 17.02 seconds so he won Round 1.
- Round 2: Both of the contestants faced three glasses of water, they must calculate how much water in these glasses in grams (They had a margin of 3 grams). Marco's answer was 276 g, actually 273.7 g; but Yang's answer was 498 g, the actual answer was 493.6 g. Marco won Round 2.
- Round 3: They faced a random sequence of brides and bridegrooms, with a total of 102 people in the line. Li started from the right side, and Andrea from the left side. Li finished in 1 minute and 18.15 seconds, while Andrea used 2 minutes and 41.51 seconds. Under huge pressure, Andrea was totally correct. Li remembered the sequence correctly but thought he placed the models in the wrong order. Li cried, repeating these words:

I got the sequence correct, but I placed it wrongly!

When the judges went through Li's actual sequence, they found that Li actually placed them correctly. Li therefore won Round 3.

- Round 4: Prior to the final competition, Robert said that he wanted to add 10 simple maths questions to prevent the contestants from memorizing the numbers directly, because "that is not difficult enough" (said Wu, Wei and Robert). Matteo wanted 10 seconds to memorize the number pyramid, and he got the pyramid incorrect with 4 wrong numbers. Then was Wu's turn, he only wanted 6 seconds to memorize the pyramid, and Wei said that he was "not wise enough" backstage, though Wu had been crowned at the World Memory Championships. Finally, Wu got the pyramid correct, and he won Round 4.

Ultimate winner: China won Episode 10, the first episode of competition series.

==== Episode 11 ====
This episode aired at 22:00 (Beijing Time, 14:00 in London, UK, 9:00 in New York City, USA) on March 21, 2014. The foreign contestants are from Spain, and all of those are winners of Increíbles: el gran desafío(the Spanish distribution of The Brain, running on Antena 3).

That night's guests are: Cecilia Cheung, a Chinese actress, singer, two-time Hong Kong Film Awards winner; the other one is Kim Soo-hyun, a Korean actor, Korean Movie Bell Award winner in 2013, the starring of Asian-hit Television series My Love from the Star. The advised judge is Konrad Kording, the associate professor of Northwestern University.

Round No.	China	Competition Formation	Result	Spain
5	Liu Hongzhi	Find the exact 5 costumes and accessories that the chosen models wore.	Liu	Paco Páze
6	Huang Jindong	Write down the exact numbers of Barcodes (full and one thirds, best-of-three).	Huang	Antia Martinez
7	Sun Cheran	Please see below.	Lopez-Nores	Martin Lopez-Nores
8	Jia Liping	Solve the 20 Rubik's Cubes blindfolded as much as possible in 10 minutes.	Jia	Alexander Olleta

- Round 5: They faced 20 models, after the models dressed in the costumes chosen by Cecilia Cheung and Kim Soo-hyun. Later they both chose one model for each of the contestants. Liu chose the costumes faster than Paco, but Paco got 2 of 5 costumes correct. Finally, it was shown that Liu got just one of the costumes incorrect, so Liu won Round 5.
- Round 6: The pair of contestants memorized the 150 Barcodes backstage for 3 hours, then they faced the first code. They both got the codes correct. But in the second codes, Huang's pen was found it had something wrong, but Konrad gave the two another try. Finally, Huang did the extra challenge correct within just approximately 19 seconds. Huang won the Round 6.
- Round 7: The first turn was Sun Cheran's turn. She played "Single Dragon Sudoku" with her back to the screen. She had to fill 1 to 9 into the Sudoku grid, and the numbers couldn't be repeated in any of the lines or the small 3x3 grids, and in the "dragon" chosen by Matin, the numbers must be in a strictly increasing or decreasing order (starting with 1 or 9). Sun got the grid correct.

Then it was Martin's turn: following the chessboard of Chess and its Knight's rules, Sun must assign the starting point and the ending point, with a number of starting point's number and the sum of each horizontal and vertical line between 200 and 500. Sun chose A5 as the starting point with the number of 31, and B5 as the finish point. The sum of numbers in all the lines must be exactly 477. Matin also got it correct. Ultimately, Konrad, the judge, decided that Martin was the winner of Round 7.

- Round 8: Both of the contestants memorized the 20 Rubik's Cubes in one hour backstage, and on the stage, they must solve the series of 20 cubes in 10 minutes. Alex used 7 minutes and 44 seconds to deal with the cubes but only got five correct. Jia used full 10 minutes and got 13 cubes correct, so he ultimately won final Round 8.

Ultimate winner: China won the 11th episode by 3–1.

==== Episode 12 ====
This episode is aired at 21:30 (Beijing Time, 13:30 in London, UK, 8:30 in New York City, USA) on March 28, 2014. The foreign contestants are from Germany, and all of those are best ever contestants of Deutschlands Superhirn(the German distribution of The Brain, formerly running on ZDF).

This is the finale of the 2014 Chinese version of The Brain franchise.

Jay Chou is back again as guest. The advised judge is Bernard Balleine, a Laureate Fellow of Australia and Director of the Laboratory of Neurobehavioral Sciences in the Brain and Mind Research Institute in the University of Sydney.

Round No.	China	Competition Formation	Result	Germany
9	Wang Feng	Memorize the digits of 400 dice, presented in cups of four, displayed for 5 seconds. Then repeat the numbers under five randomly selected cups.	Wang	Boris Nikolai Konrad
10	Zhou Wei	Finish the given calculations (see below).	Gamm	Rudiger Gamm
11	Ai Xiaowa	Identify the objects chosen by guests only by their senses in eight minutes.	Ai	Dave Janischak
12	Ni Ziqiang	Find the exact location in the 3-D sandbox Along the River During the Qingming Festival in 15 seconds(best-of-three).	Ni	Jurgen Seliger

- Round 9: They faced 400 dice in 100 cups, each had 4 dice in it. They memorized them, within 5 seconds for each cup. After memorizing the numbers, they were asked to name the numbers under five randomly selected cups. Both got all of the numbers asked correct. As the tie-breaker round, they had to repeat 20 further numbers of five further dice cups by writing on a board as fast as they can. Boris achieves this in just 20.9 seconds and is faster than Wang. However, Boris got one single number wrong; Wang repeated all of them correctly. Wang won Round 9.
- Round 10: They faced the following math questions:

(1) 6,901×7,789=53,751,889 (Zhou); 571×857=489,347 (Rudiger)
(2) 7^{13}=96,889,010,407 (Zhou); 93^{17}=2,912,125,755,884,410,842,622,249,257,854,493 (Rudiger)
(3) ^{5}√7,813,624,454,316,229=1,508.5875…(Zhou); ^{4}√83=3.018349479…(Rudiger)

Tie occurred after the three rounds. They both got their strongest question incorrect with a minor error. In the final questions in 10th round, Zhou's question was choosing which of 27,637 and 28,283 was prime, and his answer 28,283 was correct (27,637=29×953); Rudiger's question was sin 289°, and his answer was "-0.94518575…" (also correct). As a tie-breaker, Bernard decided that Rudiger was the winner of Round 10.

- Round 11: Two judges gave Ai and Dave the same 4 objects. Ai used 2 minutes and 37.40 seconds to find the objects using her breath, while Dave finished in 2 minutes and 45.51 seconds using sound waves. Both of them got the first two correct and the third wrong. However, Ai got more objects correct, she won the 11th round.
- Round 12: They both memorized 3-D Chinese world-famous painting Along the River During the Qingming Festival before the show started filming for two hours. In the first two questions, they both got a location correct according to the judges' choices. In the final question, Ni chose the correct location of a character in the sandbox, so Ni won the final round.

Ultimate winner: Rumors online came that China was the ultimate winner, but its source can not be determined. During the season finale, the winner was revealed to be China. The first season said goodbye to the Chinese audience in this episode. The victory ceremony was aired on Jiangsu TV after the show ended.

=== Controversies & criticism in and after Season 1 ===
==== "Blind Sudoku" ====
In Episode 8, Sun Cheran, the 14-year-old contestant from Beijing, challenged playing Sudoku blind. Several hours after the show aired, Chinese netizens mainly from social network Sina Weibo criticized the show, saying that her challenge was not difficult enough.

The people online said that she only completed one "easy" Sudoku, because the numbers of the Sudoku table were the repetition of numbers '1, 2, 3', '5, 6, 7' and '4, 8, 9' in various orders, since Jay Chou filled one single number and one single color in the grid.

Chen Cen, the captain and head coach of the national Sudoku team of China, later said that Sun Cheran was qualified to stay in the show, the main reason being that her ability is more than enough to challenge the Europeans. Even more, Chen Cen clarified that in the other version, there were many contestants similar to Sun.

==== "Guiding the way of flyover" ====
One week after Sun's performance, Li Yunlong qualified with the challenge of "Guiding the way of flyover." On March 8, 2014, just one day after the show aired, Wei Kunlin said these words on his Sina Weibo:

I seldom have words for a contestant: Li Yunlong's task is about memorizing binary sequence. A certain sequence of the random 120 binary numbers 0 and 1, memorize them in approximately 30 seconds, that's so close to the world record. He is a strong contender of breaking a record. It is worth being qualified, even giving 9 points, just in his field. Please think over the challenge's level of difficulty, not only memorizing 60 numbers. Please search on the Internet patiently, do not be emotional.

However, Wei's comments were strongly criticized by online viewers.

==== Kim Soo-hyun's visit ====
A major controversy was Kim Soo-hyun's visit to this show. Some media reports said that Jiangsu Television dispatched a charter flight to send Kim from Seoul, South Korea to Nanjing, where the show was taped. Accordingly, an entourage of security guards were hired, and public security departments in Jiangsu Province and Nanjing mobilized more than 300 police officers to ensure the safety of the studio. Other media reported that Kim's visit's appearance fee is about three million Chinese yuan (KR₩521,319,010, US$ 488,520, €352,110, GB£ 293,249, HK$3,791,524 or 10,299,462,628 ₫; sponsored by Google Finance). Kim's trip was heavily criticized by netizens in China, for being overtly extravagant. However, a group of fans of Kim published a full-page advertisement in Chosun Ilbo in both Chinese and Korean in support of Kim.

==== Series controversies to episode 10 ====
Minutes after Episode 10 finished, the online viewers had noted several controversies in Team China's performance.

In Round 4, Wu got a question wrong. He accidentally wrote: "18+99= 107."

The correct answer was 117. However, the rules didn't claim that getting the question wrong means the challenge is over. The "certified" online viewers said as follows:

Alas... are the final two rounds insults to our intelligence? (Mu Rong, a project manager of an advertising company in Guiyang, Guizhou Province) Wu got a maths question wrong... dealing with it seriously or carelessly makes a great difference. (An author working for a network technology company limited in Beijing)

==== Acting as a drama? ====
Some online viewers criticized that the foreign contestants "surrendered" in the competitions on the social networks, or the Chinese contestants were "cheating." They called into question the production team, and that all these episodes were making the broadcasting effects, so that they made all the three episodes into 3-1 results.

==== Excessive consumption after shows ====
It was reported that the host Jiang along with some contestants in the show are facing the heated consumption among the Chinese merchants. For example, Yang Wanli, the show's contestant in Episode 2, has taken a lot of local lectures about memorizing objects and brainpower; Jiang Changjian, the presenter and Associated Professor in Fudan University, is determined to take a lecture in Xiamen, Fujian, his hometown on May 17, 2014.

Online viewers also felt sympathy that the contestants, the host and even the co-hosts (known as "Scientific Assistants") were all facing the "excessive consumption" after the show ended in the early months of 2014, while criticizing the "wealthy" merchants' consumption.

== Summary of Season Two ==
=== Period One's qualified contestants by episode ===
==== Episode 1 ====
This episode was aired at 21:10 (Beijing Time) on January 2, 2015. This premiere episode's celebrity guest was actress Fan Bingbing.

On the opening show of Season 2, host Jiang Changjian revealed that the contestants in the Period Three later this season were from United States, United Kingdom, Japan, etc. This season also consists of challenges performed outside the studio, for instance, one contestant took the task in Hong Kong. Only one contestant was qualified in this episode.

Name	Total Score	Challenge Formation
Shi Junheng	81 pts.	Identify which three model skulls belong to whom of three out of 30 specified models (at least two out of three must be correct).

==== Episode 2 ====
This episode was aired at 21:10 (Beijing Time) on January 9, 2015. This episode's celebrity guest was actress Shu Qi.

Name	Total Score	Challenge Formation
Roy Lam	117 pts.	Identify the correct location of the map, using the clues of seven (or eight) prime numbers.
~~Bao Yun*~~	Full mark	Escape the maze featuring 127 hexagons and mark the exact locations of the four "wildcards."

- --Bao Yun later was unable to find a contestant who could challenge him, so he did not participate in the challenge against other country teams.

==== Episode 3 ====
This episode was aired at 21:10 (Beijing Time) on January 16, 2015. This episode's celebrity guest was actor Tong Dawei, as one of the judges.

Name	Total Score	Challenge Formation
Hu Qingwen	104 pts.	Identify and relocate the exact original group of 81 out of possible 648 people dancers whose ages are over 50.
Huang Huaji	90 pts.	Using the 49 Rubik's cubes to make a correct QR code to the chosen audience member's name in first letters.

==== Episode 4 ====
This episode was aired at 21:10 (Beijing Time) on January 23, 2015. Mandopop icon Jay Chou was back for the fourth time in total, and Ning Jing was also one of the celebrity guests.

Name	Total Score	Challenge Formation
Wu Renjun and Xiang Tianyou	Not given	Calculate the correct total by listening to the numbers and watching the flashing numbers on the screen.

==== Episode 5 ====
This episode was aired at 21:10 (Beijing Time) on January 30, 2015. This episode's celebrity guest was actress Tong Liya.

Name	Total Score	Challenge Formation
Sun Hongye	84 pts.	Correctly solve 100 Rubik's cubes in various shapes, and score 80 points or better.
Li Wei	112 pts.	Correctly identify the Sichuan opera masks in the right order.

==== Episode 6 ====
This episode was aired at 21:10 (Beijing Time) on February 6, 2015. This episode was the last show of the qualifier rounds.

Name	Total Score	Challenge Formation
~~Sze Wai Ho~~	104 pts.	Correctly identify the children (ages ranging from 3 months to 11 months) and their corresponding parents.
Wang Yuheng	117 pts.	Correctly find one glass of water out of 520 chosen by a judge.
Sun Yiting	117 pts.	Locate the height by listening to the sound of the object falling on the ground (with a margin of 2 meters, 1 meter higher or 1 meter lower than the correct height).

Note: Due to personal requests, Sze Wai Ho (scored out) withdrew from the competition later on.

=== Period Two's qualified and eliminated contestants by episode ===
Note: Eliminated contestants were scored out in the tables below. If the challenge was rated lower than the original score, it could be considered as an automatic elimination.

==== Episode 7 ====
This episode was aired at 21:10 (Beijing Time) on February 13, 2015. Xu Jinglei was the celebrity guest that night.

Name	Total Score	Challenge Formation
Li Linpei; ~~Hu Qingwen~~	104 pts.	Correctly identify the corresponding picture created by goats.
Li Lu; ~~Huang Huaji~~	96 pts.	Correctly recall the codes with the corresponding models (at least three out of five must be correct).
Lu Feifei; ~~Shi Junheng~~	96 pts.	Locate the pieces of what paintings them belong to.
Li Qi; ~~Lu Feifei~~	112 pts.	Correctly identify the chosen drums when the contestant is blindfolded.

==== Episode 8 ====
This episode was aired at 21:10 (Beijing Time) on February 27, 2015. Actress Li Xiaolu was the celebrity guest that night.

Name	Total Score	Challenge Formation
Liu Jian; ~~Li Linpei~~	126 pts.	Identify the Chinese surname on the corresponding cube of 150 possible surnames.
Li Wei; ~~Zheng Aiqiang~~	120 pts.	Correctly recall the combination of two models out of 30.
Wang Feng	135 pts.	Recall the chosen Mahjong tiles in correct order.

=== Brief report to Period Three by episode ===
==== Episode 9: China vs. Germany ====
This episode was aired at 21:10 (Beijing Time) on March 6, 2015. Pianist Lang Lang was the celebrity guest that night. This episode also saw the return of Prof. Robert Desimone, as one of the judges.

Round No.	China	Competition Formation	Winning contestant	Germany
1	Wang Feng	Quickly memorize a random deck of playing cards, then correctly recall the cards using a new one within 5 minutes.	Wang	Simon Reinhard
2	Li Lu	Identify the three side silhouettes belong to which three audience members.	Li	Christiane Stenger
3	Sun Yiting	Correctly identify which piano tunes the chosen three household objects made together.	Sun	Laetitia Hahn
4	Wang Feng	Recall the 5 chosen cups of dice out of 100 (4 each), as Round 9 did last year.	Wang	Boris Nikolai Konrad

- Round 1: As the first round of the "Three heads against Four" Challenges, both of the contestants faced a random deck of playing cards. Their job was memorizing it and put it into a correct order. Wang Feng, as the only Asian winner of World Memory Championships at the time of broadcast, memorized the deck in 19.80 seconds, while Simon, German Memory Master of 2009 used a little more time than Wang. Simon made some mistakes, and Wang Feng recalled the full deck correctly within 5-minute time limit. Wang won this round.
- Round 2: The contestants memorized the 100 random audience members with their names (in first letters for given names and surnames), and their appearance in the front only. Then they faced 3 side silhouettes chosen by Lang Lang. Contestants must identify those silhouettes belong to whom, and write down their first letters for the names and surnames, and their random seat numbers. Li Lu finished first with an advantage of about 1 minute and 10 seconds. However, Christiane gave one incorrect answer to the second audience member's seat number, making Li Lu became the winner.
- Round 3: The contestants was given three household objects. The co-presenter made these objects some noises, but the contestants must name the hidden piano key sounds in such noises, then write down what they have heard. Sun Yiting's answer was closer to the judgement of the spectrum, making Sun Yiting became the third round's winner.
- Round 4: During the final round, Boris and Wang Feng faced the challenge they competed last year. Boris did his best even to score one point for the German team. In the last cup of dice, Wang Feng gave the correct answer. However, Boris failed to recall the numbers in the cup Number 93.

Ultimate winner: China won the first competition in 2015 edition with a score of 4–0.

==== Episode 10: China vs. Japan ====
This episode was aired at 21:10 (Beijing Time) on March 13, 2015. Prof. Robert Desimone stayed on the seat for the task as a judge.

Round No.	China	Competition Formation	Winning contestant(s)	Japan
5	Sun Hongye	Solve 100 Rubik's Cubes correctly, whoever solves faster wins.	Gunji	Mitsuki Gunji
6	Wang Yuheng	Identify the three fans out of possible 200, without showing the entire pictures on them.	Wang	Akira Haraguchi
7	Xiang Tianyou; Wu Renjun	Correctly work out arithmetic questions (features 3 sub-rounds).	Japanese contestants	Takeo Sasano; Rinne Tsujikubo

- Round 5: Two contestants faced the same 100 Rubik's Cubes in various shapes. Their task was to solve all the cubes, whoever solves faster won. Mitsuki finished first with an advantage of one and a half minutes, and became the winner of this round. It is worth noticing that Mitsuki is the current Guinness World Record holder of the person who solves a 3x3 Rubik's Cube fastest, and his record was only about 7 seconds.
- Round 6: Two similar pictures from China and Japan (one from each respective country) was divided into 100 fans each. They must identify the three fans chosen by Robert by showing the edges of those closed fans, in other words, the fans were kept closed when the competition is underway. Before the competition, they could memorize and keep them familiar with the 200 fans for 2 hours, however, Wang decided not to watch ANY of the fans. During the competition, Wang finished the task first, and he got all the answer correctly. But Haraguchi failed to identify two of the fans, Wang won this round.
- Round 7: As the tie-breaking round and the "Two-on-two" round, the score would be doubled. In this round, there was three sub-rounds. In the first two rounds, the credits will be rated by the difficulty they chose on the difficulty board. The contestant correctly answered the most difficult question would score six points, and four points for the second most difficult, then two and one for the rest of contestants. However, getting the answer wrong would score nothing (zero points) in each of the first two sub-rounds.
  - 1) All the contestants must solve the questions that has 20 numbers to be added flashing on the screen. They could choose how quick they wanted. In this round, Wu started first, he chose the difficulty that could keep him safe for the competition. Next two contestants, Xiang and Tsujikubo chose the same difficulty level rated 7 out of 10, and they answered those sums correctly. Finally, Sasano chose the highest level of difficulty (8 out of 10), and got the correct answer as well. In this sub-round, Japan was in the lead with a score of 9-4 (Round 7 only).
  - 2) To increase the difficulty, there were two sets of double digit numbers (10 numbers each) to be added flashing on the screen. The contestants must correctly work out both of the answers to score points. However, Japanese contestants started first, and Tsujikubo got the 5-star question (addition only, 6 seconds for showing the numbers) correct. Then Wu and Sasano correctly got the same level (6 out of possible 10) of question. At last, Xiang answered the most difficult one (7 out of 10, addition only for 4 seconds), and he correctly worked out those sums. After two sub-rounds, Japanese contestants lead with 15–11.
  - 3) In the final round, there were four questions for multiplication and division (at least five-digit numbers used). Those questions worth 2, 4, 6, 6 points, and all the questions were on the buzzer. The first pair of contestants buzz-in with the correct answer would score points, but if the contestant got the question wrong, the respective points would be taken away from the total. In the first question (9-digit ÷ 5-digit), Wu Renjun was the first to buzz-in and correctly answered that. But in the second round (6-digit × 6-digit) worth four points, Tsujikubo incorrectly solved that, and as a result, those four points were taken away from the Japanese contestants' score. In the final two rounds (12-digit ÷ 6-digit and 7-digit × 7-digit), Tsujikubo had taken control of the whole competition, and under such massive pressure, she got both of them correct. Japanese contestants won the "Double pointer" Round 7 with a massive score of 23–11.

Ultimate winner: Japan became the first team to defeat the "undefeated" Chinese contestants with a result of 3–1.

==== Episode 11: China vs. United Kingdom ====
This episode was aired at 21:10 (Beijing Time) on March 20, 2015. This episode saw the return of the contestant Li Lu, who appeared on the competition two weeks (on television) ago. This show's celebrity guests were Huang Lei, a Chinese actor, and a regular guest of If You Are the One, a weekly dating show presented by one of the judges Meng Fei; and actress Shu Qi for the second time in the series. The advisory judge this time was Dagnar Sternad, PhD of experimental psychology in University of Connecticut, professor of biology and physics at Northeastern University, and visiting professor of Massachusetts Institute of Technology.

Round No.	China	Competition Formation	Winning contestant	United Kingdom
8	Roy Lam	Find the only random 5-digit code hidden in the wall that can open the sealed security box.	Fountain	Robert Fountain
9	Li Wei	Translate the two given words into three (out of 8) languages and identify the pieces for those words.	Kermode	Katie Kermode
10	Liu Jian	Correctly find the chosen fake bombs and the corresponding lines connect to them.	Liu	James Paterson
11	Li Lu	Identify the chosen barcode of an express delivery and call the chosen audience member (sudden death format, faster finger wins).	Pridmore	Ben Pridmore

- Round 8: This round was exactly the same as what Lin did in the qualifier round for this season. However, in this round, two contestants would play against each other. The person who takes a shorter amount of time to calculate the security code hidden in the wall featuring 1,380 codes wins. To decrease the possibility of guessing the answers, the three strikes rule was used - if the contestant fails to input the correct code, the competition ends immediately and he loses. The correct code was hidden in the crossing of four of the possible seven prime numbers. In the competition, Robert went faster and won the Round 8. The number 67,971 is a composite number rather than a prime number which was chosen in the qualifier round; it is divisible by 3 (67,971 = 3 × 139 × 163).
- Round 9: This round consisted of recalling more than 1,000 words in 8 non-Latin-based languages: the competition used Arabic, Persian, Burmese, Cambodian, Nepali, Thai, Sinhala and Tamil. They had to memorize all those words before the show, and in the competition, all those words would be split into thousands of pieces. They must find the correct pieces on the board to complete the translated words (two words for three languages each) in 40 minutes. Li Wei completed the round first to apply pressure to Katie, but in the competition, Katie got two more correct answers than Li Wei. As a result, Chinese contestants lost two straight rounds.

Ultimate winner: United Kingdom won the competition with a result of 3–1, which means the Chinese contestants have lost two shows in a row.

==== Episode 12: China vs. United States ====
Round No.	China	Competition Formation	Winning contestant	United States
12	Li Wei	Identify 3 cows out of 1,900 cows by viewing the spots	Li	Johnny Briones
13	Li Qi	Identify 4 poles blind-folded	Ruiz	Juan Ruiz
14	Liu Jian	Collect most number of cards in a beehive maze	Liu	Nelson Dellis

Ultimate winner: China won the competition with a result of 3–1 (round 3 has 2 points), which means the Chinese contestants have won two out of four competitions.

=== Controversies & criticism in and after Season 2 ===
==== Wang Yuheng: Political references ====
In the 10th episode of the second season, facing the Japanese contestants, Chinese contestant Wang Yuheng said to the camera:

Even the number of fans rose to 300,000, I could still find it! I saw a fan full of Chinese characters...

Wang's such words and the number 300,000 made a huge controversy on the social media, because it was the number of victims in Nanking Massacre two years before World War II, and the show was filmed in Nanjing, China. Wang stressed on the references of history and politics, made him became controversial after the show.

== Summary of Season Four ==
=== Phase 1's Qualified Contestants by Episode ===
==== Episode 1 ====
This episode aired on January 6, 2017. Episode 1's guest judge was Zhang Ziyi.

Name	Total Score	Challenge Formation	Challenged
Huang Zheng	104 pts.	Correctly identify the one push pin difference between two otherwise identical push pin paintings.	Zheng Caiqian

===== Hall of Fame vs. Xiao Du =====
Representative	Challenge Formation	Winner
Wang Feng	Identify two dancers from a dance group by their childhood photo (1 pt.) Given an adult face, identify their childhood face from thirty elementary school class photos. (2 pts.)	Xiao Du (3–2)

==== Episode 2 ====
This episode aired on January 13, 2017. Episode 2's guest judge was Jay Chou.

Name	Total Score	Challenge Formation	Challenged
Xie Chaodong	88 pts.	Correctly identify three changed puppet pieces from a Chinese shadow puppet theatre.	Shen Yifan
Yu Zhan	126 pts.	Given three geographical photos, correctly mark the location, angle, and distance of at least two of the photos on a contour map.	Bao Yun

===== Hall of Fame vs. Xiao Du =====
Representative	Challenge Formation	Winner
Sun Yiting	Identify three singers from a choir after hearing their speaking voices.	Draw (1-1)

==== Episode 3 ====
This episode aired on January 20, 2017. Episode 3's guest judge was Fu Yuanhui.

Name	Total Score	Challenge Formation	Challenged
Chen Hao	104 pts.	Correctly reorder a dotted path by memorizing the scrambled individual pieces.	Wang Feng
Su Zehe	96 pts.	Correctly identify two closed umbrellas by their dancer after watching a Chinese spinning umbrella dance.	Li Wei

===== Hall of Fame vs. Xiao Du =====
Representative	Challenge Formation	Winner
Wang Yuheng	Correctly identify three people from a thirty-man lineup after watching three surveillance videos.	Xiao Du (2–0)

==== Episode 4 ====
This episode aired on February 3, 2017. Episode 4's guest judge was Zhang Ziyi.

Name	Total Score	Challenge Formation	Challenged
Yu Yipei	Full mark	Given a small section of a decomposed portrait, correctly select the original portrait.	Wang Yuheng
Wang Jiayu	Last man standing	Eliminate all other competitors by speedcubing the fastest.	Wang Yinghao
Liu Na	88 pts.	Find the missing color sheet from an aligned gallery of over 200 colored sheets.	Liu Jian

==== Episode 5 ====
This episode aired on February 10, 2017. Episode 5's guest judge was Zhang Ziyi.

Name	Total Score	Challenge Formation	Challenged
Lin Kaijun	Last man standing	Eliminate all other competitors by blindcubing the fastest.	Jia Liping
Yu Binjing	112 pts.	Correctly estimate the x and y zoom values of at least two of three Mandelbrot sets.	Any

==== Episode 6 ====
This episode aired on February 17, 2017. Episode 6's guest judge was Wu Minxia.

Name	Total Score	Challenge Formation
Hu Yuxuan	Last man standing	Eliminate all other competitors by solving Sudoku puzzles the fastest.
Chung En-jou	Qualified	Defeat two Japanese mathematicians in timed math problem sets.
Yu Binjing ~~Xie Chaodong~~	Qualified	Identify the correct marionettes from watching the puppeteers' hand motions.

=== Phase Two's head-to-head contests by episode ===
Starting Episode 7, each incumbent and challenger competed for one seat on the international team in a total of nine head-to-head contests.

==== Episode 7 ====
This episode aired on February 24, 2017.

Hall of Fame	Challenger	Competition Formation	Winner
Wang Feng	Chen Hao	Correctly recall the coordinates of a dotted path piece.	Wang Feng
Jia Liping	Lin Kaijun	Quickly solve pre-memorized Rubik's cubes only from hearing the scrambling sounds.	None(Jia Liping)
Wang Yinghao	Wang Jiayu	Overtake the other competitor in a circle of 2x2 and 3x3 Rubik's cubes.	None(Wang Yinghao)

- Side note: Due to the fact that Jia Liping committed cheating in his head-to-head, Jia Liping, Lin Kaijun, Wang Yinghao, and Wang Jiayu were removed from the team.

==== Episode 8 ====
This episode aired on March 3, 2017.

Hall of Fame	Challenger	Competition Formation	Winner
Liu Jian	Liu Na	Correctly recall the suitcase number after seeing one item from its suitcase.	Liu Jian
Wang Yuheng	Yu Yipei	Given a small section (1/20 or 1/40) of a decomposed portrait, correctly select the original portrait.	Yu Yipei

==== Episode 9 ====
This episode aired on March 10, 2017.

Hall of Fame	Challenger	Competition Formation	Winner
Bao Yun	Yu Zhan	Correctly deduce a fragmented Chinese character in augmented reality.	Bao Yun
Zheng Caiqian	Huang Zheng	Correctly identify the only spot difference between two rotating radar pictures.	Huang Zheng
Li Wei	Su Zehe	Correctly identify the missing picture from 15 overlapping pictures.	Su Zehe
Shen Yifan	Yu Binjing	No contest, Shen Yifan withdrew due to health concerns.	Yu Binjing

==== Episode 10 ====
This episode aired on March 17, 2017.

Chinese Contestant	International Contestant	Competition Formation	Winner
Su Zehe	Jonas von Essen	Memorize 200 walnuts' engravings, then correctly recall them.	Jonas von Essen
Hu Yuxuan	Morinishi Kota	Compete against each other in 5 matches of Sudoku.	Hu Yuxuan
Chung En-jou	Tsuchiya Hiroaki	Compete against each other in 9 math problems.	Tsuchiya Hiroaki

==== Episode 11 ====
This episode aired on March 24, 2017.

Chinese Contestant	International Contestant	Competition Formation	Winner
Bao Yun	Alisa Kellner	Find the correct origami from a diagram of the vertices of the folds of the origami.	Bao Yun
Huang Zheng	Sylvain Arnoux	Correctly identify the only spot with a changed colour from the two rotating radar pictures.	Huang Zheng
Liu Jian	Johannes Zhou Zhang-wei	Memorise 88 different Chinese herbs and spice medicine recipes based on their appearance and the drawers the individual components were placed in, then given a recipe with names of the ingredients, recreate the recipe from memory of the appearances of the ingredients.	Johannes Zhou Zhang-wei

==== Episode 12 ====
This episode aired on March 31, 2017.

Chinese Contestant	International Contestant	Competition Formation	Winner
Yu Binjing	Marwin Wallonius	Correctly deduce the racing track based on only watching the driver's steering wheel movements.	Yu Binjing
Yu Yipei	Yanjaa	Memorize first and second generation synthesized images, then correctly identify the third generation synthesized "grandchild" from 336 images.	Yanjaa
Wang Feng	Alex Mullen	Memorize 50 airline routes from 5 companies, their departure and arrival location, including departure and arrival time, then correctly recall them.	Alex Mullen

=== The Grand Final ===
In the last ever show of The Brain, the judging panel decided that:

The Grand Champion of the 2017 edition of The Brain is: the human team AND the Xiao Du robot BOTH win!

Following that statement, the long-time presenter Prof. Jiang Changjian concluded the entire series with these words, which have been translated into English:

Many people repeated the question of the first season, the second season, and the third season. That is: is there going to be a fifth season? Here, I will only say one sentence: this stage may not; but the spirit of science lasts forever.

Therefore, Sang Jie, the executive producer of The Brain announced that the show won't be renewed for a fifth season, according to contestant Bao Yun's weibo. Presenter Jiang Changjian also confirmed that shortly after the recording of the final show. The official Weibo then resigned, with just one word "GOODBYE".

== Notable contestants chronology ==
=== Domestic ===
These contestants made appearances in multiple seasons of The Brain as contestants. Only those who have qualified in the qualifier round or have been a member of "The Brain's Hall of Fame" will count.

Contestant	Specialist	Seasons			
Contestant	Specialist	One_{(2014)}	Two_{(2015)}	Three_{(2016)}	Four_{(2017)}
Zheng Caiqian	Memory/Stereoscopic vision				
Li Wei	Memory				
Jia Liping	Blindfolded cubing				Game Cancelled
Wang Feng	Memory				
Wang Yuheng	Visual identification				
Roy Lam	Memory/Logic				
Huang Jindong	Memory				
Wang Yinghao	Speedcubing				Game Cancelled
Chen Zhiqiang	Memory/Stereoscopic vision				
Shen Yifan	Memory				
Sun Yiting	Audial identification				
Bao Yun	Orientation				
Liu Jian	Memory				

Note: Due to the fact that Sun Yiting received campus violence exclusively for him since he became a notable contestant on the programme, Sun immigrated to Australia with the local citizenship in 2017.

=== International ===
These international contestants played in multiple seasons of The Brain.

Contestant	Specialist	Seasons			
Contestant	Specialist	One_{(2014)}	Two_{(2015)}	Three_{(2016)}	Four_{(2017)}
Martin Lopez-Nores	Puzzles				
Ben Pridmore	Memory				
Robert Fountain	Logic				
Rinne Tsujikubo	Mental calculation				
Hiroaki Tsuchiya	Mental calculation				
Simon Reinhard	Memory				
Boris Nikolai Konrad	Memory				
Jonas von Essen	Memory				

Other notable mentions include Rüdiger Gamm who is known as ‘the human calculator’.

== Judges ==
Scientific judge in all seasons of the original series is Wei Kunlin.

=== Season 1 ===
Episodes	Name
1 - Present	Li Yongbo
1 - 8	Liang Dong
1–4, 6, 8-Present	Tao Ching-Ying
5, 7	Zhang Ziyi
9	Ning Caishen

=== Season 2 ===
Episodes	Name
1 - present	Gao Xiaosong
1 - present	Meng Fei
1 - present	Tao Ching-Ying

=== Season 3 ===
Episodes	Name	Chair number
1 - present	Zhang Zhaozhong	1
1 - 9	Guo Jingming	2
1 - present	Tao Ching-Ying	3
13	Michael Gazzaniga, Dora E. Angelaki, Robert Desimone	

=== Season 4 ===
Episodes	Name	Chair number
1 - 5	Wang Feng	1
1 - 5	Liu Guoliang	2
1 - 5	Tao Ching-Ying	3
13	Thomas C. Südhof, Robert Desimone, Lin Yuanqing	

== Celebrity Guests ==
=== Season 1 ===
Episodes	Panellists
1	Li Yanhong
1, 8, 12	Jay Chou
9	Meng Fei
10	Lin Dan
11	Kim Soo-hyun
11	Cecilia Cheung
11	Fan Bingbing

Note: The celebrity guests as judges and contestants are not included in the list.

=== Season 3 ===
Episodes	Panellists
1	SNH48, Wang Shi
3	T-ara, Jay Chou
4, 7	TFBoys, Ren Zhiqiang
11	NMB48, SNH48, Daisuke Ono, Ong Jia Yee
13	Li Yuchun

Note: Sun Rui, a member of SNH48, is featured as a co-presenter throughout the season.

=== Season 4: Human vs Supercomputer ===
Episodes	Panellists
1	Edvard Moser
2	Jay Chou
3	Fu Yuanhui
1, 4, 5	Zhang Ziyi
6	Wu Minxia
7	Carina Lau
7, 8	Ke Jie, Barbie Shu, Lang Ping
7 - 12	Jiang Zhenyu
9	Meng Fei
10	Fukuhara Ai
9 - 12	Robert Desimone
11	Huang Jianxiang

=== Season 8 ===
Episodes	Panellists
7	Bai Jingting

== Transmissions ==
=== Regular series ===
Series	Start date	End date	Episodes
1	3 January 2014	28 March 2014	12
2	2 January 2015	27 March 2015	12
3	8 January 2016	1 April 2016	13
4	6 January 2017	7 April 2017	13

=== Reformatted series: 最强大脑之燃烧吧大脑 ===
Series	Start date	End date	Episodes
1	5 January 2018	6 April 2018	13
2	15 February 2019	3 May 2019	12

== International versions ==
Country/region	Local title	Presenter(s)	Channel	Date premiered
France	Les Extra-ordinaires	Christophe Dechavanne	TF1	March 6, 2015
Germany (original version)	Deutschlands Superhirn	Jörg Pilawa; Steven Gätjen	ZDF	December 28, 2011
Italy	Superbrain - Le Supermenti	Paola Perego	Rai 1	December 29, 2012
Poland	The Brain. Genialny Umysł	Jerzy Mielewski	Polsat	March 7, 2017
Russia	Удивительные люди Udivitelnyye Lyudi (Note: Since 2024, the show airs without Banijay's involvement in the production.)	Alexander Gurevich (1–5); Artyom Vargaftik (6–present)	Russia-1	September 25, 2016
Spain	Increíbles: el gran desafío	Carlos Sobera	Antena 3	February 8, 2013
Ukraine	Дивовижні люди Dyvovyzhni Lyudi	Oleksandr Skichko	Ukraina	February 23, 2019
United States	Superhuman	Kal Penn	Fox	January 4, 2016
Vietnam	Siêu trí tuệ Việt Nam	Trấn Thành	HTV2 (Vie Channel)	October 26, 2019

=== International broadcast ===
Season 1 is also broadcast in Singapore on Mediacorp Channel U. In Singapore, this show has aired every Tuesday at 20:00, starting from July 15, 2014. Again, Season 2 was also broadcast in the same channel since September 2015, 20:30, the same goes to NTV7 of Malaysia, who also broadcast Season 3 and Season 4.

Reruns of the inaugural season were broadcasting in Australia every Sunday on SBS 2, commencing on January 24, 2016.

== Awards ==
- In 2014, The show won "Best TV Art Program Award" in the 27th China TV Golden Eagle Awards.

== See also ==
- Brain
- Human brain

Similar television programmes:

- The Big Brain Theory, 2013, Discovery Channel
- Beat the Brain, 2015, BBC Two
