= Rajan Mahadevan =

Rajan Srinivasan Mahadevan (born 1957) is an Indian mnemonist.

== Early life ==
Mahadevan was born in Madras in 1957 and moved to Mangalore in 1959. He discovered his ability to memorize numbers at the age of 5 during a party hosted by his family. During the party, Rajan wandered to a parking lot and committed the license plate numbers of every guest's car for recitation later.

== Education ==
In 1977, after losing interest in engineering, Mahadevan set to memorize substantial parts of pi. On 5 July 1981, he recited from memory the first 31,811 digits of pi. This secured him a place in the 1984 Guinness Book of World Records, and he has been featured on Larry King Live and Reader's Digest.

Mahadevan received his bachelor's degree in psychology in 1984 and his master's degree in clinical psychology from the University of Mysore in 1986 during his extended participation in memory study. Mahadevan's digit span was found to be nearly ten times the average; it is estimated that, before the effects of practice, it was 15 digits.

Although Mahadevan is adept at remembering numbers, he nevertheless displays only an average memory when it comes to prose passages or geometric shapes.

Mahadevan holds the position of Distinguished Lecturer at the University of Tennessee, where he teaches courses in learning and thinking as well as cognitive psychology.

== See also ==
- Ben Pridmore
- Dominic O'Brien
- Sri Vyshnavi Yarlagadda
- Grand Master of Memory
- Mnemonic major system

== Notes ==
- "Unexceptional spatial memory in an exceptional memorist", Biederman et al., Journal of Experimental Psychology Learn Mem Cogn, 1992 May;18(3):654-7.
- Mahadevan, Rajan (18 June 1989). "The Man With the Endless Memory; Rajan Mahadevan Is Trying to Memorize 100,000 Digits. For Him, It's Easy as Pi". The Washington Post. Archived from the original on 16 May 2011 – via HighBeam Research.
- "Memory Search by a Memorist", Thompson et al. Lawrence Erlbaum Associates, Inc., New Jersey, 1993
