= Extreme Memory Tournament =

Digital memory competition

Memory League is a memory competition platform originally founded and created by Nelson Dellis and Simon Orton under the name Extreme Memory Tournament (XMT).

Memory League differs from traditional memory competitions in the fact that it is entirely digital, has head-to-head matches, and is composed of shorter disciplines. The five disciplines are one-minute memorization of names, words, images, numbers, and cards.

The first three world championships took place in San Diego, California in 2014, 2015, and 2016. The structure of the competition saw 24 of the World's top memorizers, including Andi Bell (UK), Ben Pridmore (UK), Jonas von Essen (Sweden), and Yanjaa compete for up to US$75,000 in prize money per championship over the course of three days. The fourth world championship was held online in January 2022.

== 2014 World Championship ==
The 2014 World Championship took place on April 26–27.

=== 2014 Winners ===
The 2014 winners of the World Championship were:

- First place: Simon Reinhard
- Second place: Johannes Mallow
- Third place: Jonas von Essen

== 2015 World Championship ==
Mnemonists from seven countries competed in over 45 rounds on May 2–3, 2016.

=== 2015 Winners ===
The 2015 winners of the World Championship were:

- First place: Johannes Mallow
- Second place: Boris Konrad
- Third place: Simon Reinhard

== 2016 World Championship ==
The 2016 world championship took place on June 24–26 and was an IAM-ranked competition.

=== 2016 Winners ===
The 2016 winners of the world championship were:

- First place: Simon Reinhard
- Second place: Purevjav Erdenesaikhan
- Third place: Tsetsegzul Zorigtbaatar

== 2022 World Championship ==
The 2022 World Championship was held online from January 16-31 as the culmination of the 2021 World Tour, which consisted of three seasons and three slam tournaments, with the top 16 competitors qualifying for the World Championship.

=== 2022 Winners ===
The 2022 winners of the world championship were:

- First place: Alex Mullen
- Second place: Andrea Muzii
- Third place: Simon Reinhard

== 2023 World Championship ==
The 2023 World Championship was held online from January 8-29 as the culmination of the 2022 World Tour, which consisted of three seasons and three slam tournaments, with the top 16 competitors qualifying for the World Championship.

=== 2023 Winners ===
The 2023 winners of the world championship were:

- First place: Alex Mullen
- Second place: Andrea Muzii
- Third place: Vishvaa Rajakumar

== Online Memory League Championship ==
There is a seasonal Online Memory League Championship, which in 2021 was incorporated into an annual "World Tour," consisting of three regular seasons interspersed with three slam tournaments.

== Other Memory League Championships ==
Other Memory League championships have included, among others:

- 2019 Scandinavia Open Memory League Championship
- 2018 Japan Memory League Championship
- 2018 Egypt Kids Memory League Championship
- 2018 Egypt Junior Memory League Championship
- 2018 Scandinavian Open Memory League Championship
- 2018 Canada Junior Memory League Championship
- 2017 Scandinavian Open Memory League Championship
- 2017 German Open Memory League Championship
- 2017 UK Open Memory League Championship
- 2016 UK Memory League Championship

== See also ==
- USA Memory Championship
- Grand Master of Memory
- List of world championships in mind sports
- Memory sport
- Method of loci
- Mnemonist
- Mnemonic major system
