= Chew Kin Meng =

Malaysian memory athlete

Chew Kin Meng 周键明
Personal information
- Born: 1989; Kuala Lumpur, Malaysia
- Occupation: Memory Athlete

Sport
- Sport: Memory

Chew Kin Meng

Chinese name
- Traditional Chinese: 周鍵明
- Hanyu Pinyin: Zhōu Jiànmíng
- Jyutping: Zau1 Gin6 Ming4
- Hokkien POJ: Chiu Kiān-bêng
- Tâi-lô: Tsiu Kiān-bîng

Chew Kin Meng (Chinese: 周键明; born 1989 - Kuala Lumpur, Malaysia) is a Malaysian memory athlete and Guinness World Record holder for The Most Decimal Places of Euler's Number Memorised in 2019. He has broken a total of 7 Malaysian Memory Records and achieved the title of International Master of Memory.

== Biography ==
Kin Meng studied accounting at SEGi University but, he was forced to discontinue his degree due to financial complications.

He achieved the International Master of Memory title during the World Memory Championships.

In 2015, he broke 4 Malaysia Memory Records at the Asian Memory Championship and 3 Malaysia Memory Records in 2016, and ranked No. 80 Memory athlete in the world in the same year.

In 2018, he was recognized as the first International arbiter of the Global Memory Championship in China, which served as the head of the committee of arbiters of the competition.

On March 31, In 2019, he broke the Guinness World Record for The Most Decimal Places of Euler is Numbers Memorized, he successfully recited 4,556 digits of Euler's number within 1 hour, 7 minutes and 49 seconds.

== Achievements ==
- 2019: Guinness World Records "Most decimal places of Euler’s number memorised"
- 2019: Malaysia Book of records "Most decimal places of Euler’s number memorised"
- 2019: Top 30 Finalists of Ten Outstanding Young Malaysians by JCI Malaysia.
- 2018: International Arbiter of the Global Championship, China.
- 2016: Achieve International Master of Memory (IMM) Title in World Memory Championship.
- 2016: Ranked No. 1 Memory athlete in Malaysia.

== See also ==
- Sport in Malaysia
