= Creighton Carvello =

Creighton Carvello (14 November 1944 – 18 November 2008) was a British mnemonist. Carvello was born in Patna, Bihar, India but lived in the UK from 1949 until his death. His first World Record for memory was in 1979 when he recited the first 20,013 places of pi.

In 1987 he appeared on the BBC television programme Record Breakers, memorising one shuffled deck of cards in 2 minutes 59 seconds. It was this feat of memory which first inspired Dominic O'Brien, who later went on to gain the title of World Memory Champion eight times.

== Memory Feats ==
Carvello frequently appeared on radio and television demonstrating his knowledge of sport, namely the teams, players, scores and referees of FA Cup Finals and the horses and jockeys of The Derby and Grand National horse races. Carvello memorised the telephone numbers of every person in Middlesbrough named Smith.
