= Nischal Narayanam =

Indian child prodigy and chartered accountant

Nischal
- Born: August 10, 1995 (age 31); Hyderabad, India
- Occupation: Educationalist
- Title: Double Guinness World Records Holder; Gold Medal in (Kids Category) World Memory Championships; Youngest CA; Double Post-Graduate
- Website: https://nischalsworld.com

Nischal Narayanam is an Indian child prodigy and India's youngest chartered accountant. He completed his post-graduation in mathematics & commerce at the age of 19 from Osmania University, Hyderabad.

He is the Youngest Double Guinness World Record holder (in the field of Memory) at the age of 13. At the age of 12 he become a World Memory Champion. He is among the recipient of “National Child Award”, Gold medal (President Award, the highest honour given by the Government of India for children under 15 years of age).

== Early life ==
Born to N.Nageswara Rao (Industrialist) and Dr.N.Padmavathy (Academic), Nischal had a passion in the field of Mathematics and Commerce from an early age. Narayanam completed his early Academic VIII, IX, X, XI and XII (IGCSE, AS and A levels) all in 'One Academic Year' from the Cambridge University, London. At the age of 16, Nischal got his bachelor's degree in Commerce and earned the distinction of 'Youngest Graduate' from 'Osmania University', Hyderabad.

Nischal completed his CA Final Examinations at the age of 19, attained his master's degree in Mathematics and Statistics and also master's degree in commerce. This made him 'India's Youngest Chartered Accountant' and 'Youngest Double Post-Graduate' in the 85 years history of 'Osmania University', Hyderabad.

== Business ==
At the age of 15, Nischal Narayanam started a company Nischal's Smart Learning Solutions Pvt. Ltd

== Awards and achievements ==
- 2006: First Guinness World Record for memorizing 225 random objects in a span of just 12.07 minutes
- 2007: Wins World Memory Championship (Gold Medal in the Kids Category) for the year 2007
- 2008: National Child Award Gold Medal
- 2009: Second Guinness World Record in the category of ‘Longest Sequence of Numbers Memorized in 1 Minute'
