= Memory sport =

Memory competitions

Memory sport, sometimes referred to as competitive memory or the mind sport of memory, refers to competitions in which participants attempt to memorize then recall different forms of information, under certain guidelines. The sport has been formally developed since 1991 and features national and international championships. The primary worldwide organizational bodies are the WMSC (World Memory Sports Council) and the IAM (International Association of Memory).

In response to a conspicuous rivalry between two challengers to the same Guinness Book Record, Memory Sports Promotion and Control Ltd., (Company number 3548879) was incorporated on 6 April 1998, by the invigilators Dr Peter Marshall and Ms Anne Perrett. The company operated under the business name The World Memory Sports Association.

One common type of competition involves memorizing the order of randomized cards in as little time as possible, after which the competitor is required to arrange new decks of cards in the same order.

Mnemonic techniques are generally considered to be a necessary part of competition, and are improved through extensive practice. These can include the method of loci, the use of mnemonic linking and chunking, or other techniques for storage and retrieval of information.

== History ==
Techniques for training memory are discussed as far back as ancient Greece, and formal memory training was long considered an important part of basic education known as the art of memory. However, the development of trained memorization into a sport is only a development of the late 20th century, and even then has remained relatively limited in scope. The first worldwide competition was held as the World Memory Championships in 1991, and has been held again in every year since, with the exception of 1992.

== Competitions ==
Following the establishment of the World Memory Championships in 1991, national competitions have been set up in more than a dozen countries, including the U.S., India, Germany, UK, Italy, Sweden, Australia, Singapore, China, Japan, South Korea, Mongolia, and the Philippines, among others. An up-to-date list of competitions can be found at the International Association of Memory statistics website.

In 2016, due to the dispute between players and the WMSC (World Memory Sports Council), most of the organizations except China and Arabia withdrew from the WMSC and launched the IAM (International Association of Memory). Beginning in 2017, both organizations hosted their own world championships.

The Guild of Mnemonists Ltd was incorporated 6 April 1998, to foster communication and technique sharing as well as to develop ethical controls for competitions and guaranteed standards in memory training courses. The Guild has since ceased to function.

== Techniques ==
Competitors describe numerous methods and techniques for improving their memorization skills, with some having published and named their specific methods. These include, for instance, the Dominic system, named after former World Champion Dominic O'Brien, the mnemonic major system, as well as the person-action-object system which involves encoding cards and numbers into sequences of persons, actions, and objects. These methods are sometimes referred to as "mnemotechnics".

O'Brien's Dominic system is a powerful memorizing strategy that combines both traditional and innovative techniques. These include techniques like assigning easily remembered people to unmeaningful things such as numbers, and more known techniques like the memory palace.

Joshua Foer has written, "Though every competitor has his own unique method of memorization for each event, all mnemonic techniques are essentially based on the concept of elaborative encoding, which holds that the more meaningful something is, the easier it is to remember."

== Disciplines ==
Sanctioned memory competitions comply with one of four formats for competition depending on the level. At the World Championship, all ten disciplines are conducted at maximum timing, while at other international competitions some disciplines are shortened to a 30-minute format. As the competitions become more regional, some disciplines are cut while others are shortened.

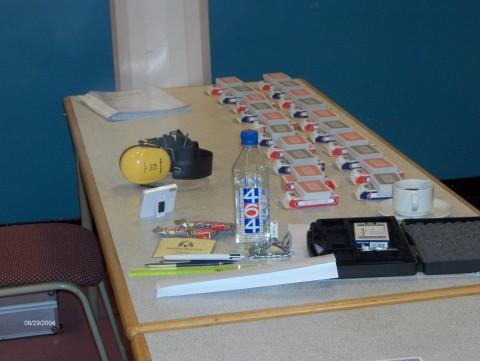
Decks of playing cards at the World Memory Championships

According to the World Memory Championship Competitors Handbook, the ten disciplines are as follows:

1. Names and Faces – "Memorize and recall as many names as possible and link them to the right face."
2. Binary Numbers – "Memorize and recall as many binary digits as possible."
3. Random Numbers – "Memorize as many random digits as possible, in complete rows of 40 digits, and recall them perfectly."
4. Abstract Images – "Memorize and recall the sequence of abstract images in as many rows as possible."
5. Speed Numbers – "Memorize as many random digits as quickly as possible, in complete rows of 40 digits, and recall them perfectly."
6. Historic/Future Dates – "Memorize as many numerical historic/future dates as possible and to link them to the correct fictional event."
7. Random Cards – "Memorize and recall as many separate packs (decks) of 52 playing cards as possible."
8. Random Words – "Memorize as many random words in complete columns of 20 as possible and recall them perfectly."
9. Spoken Number – "Listen to, memorize, and recall as many spoken numbers as possible."
10. Speed Cards – "Memorize and recall a single pack of 52 playing cards in the shortest possible time."

In addition to the traditional competitions organized by the World Memory Sports Council or International Association of Memory, memory athletes often compete at alternative-format competitions. These include the Memory League Championships (formerly the Extreme Memory Tournament), Memoriad, and the MAA Memo Games.

Other types of memory competitions may not feature timed events. For instance, records for the memorization of π (known as piphilology) have been recorded since the 1970s, with the current record holder having produced from memory more than 70,000 digits.

== Records ==
Memory sport continues to have its records broken rapidly. The world speed record for memorizing a deck of cards is 12.74 seconds, achieved by Shijir-Erdene Bat-Enkh of Mongolia in 2017. A recent world record for the most decimal digits memorized in five minutes is 642, accomplished by Wei Qinru in 2024. There are two different up-to-date lists of world and national records: 1. The International Association of Memory statistics website 2. The World Memory Sports Council Official Statistics website.

== Designations ==
The highest designation set up by the World Memory Sports Council, which organizes the World Memory Championships, is the Grand Master of Memory. Subclassifications include international grandmaster (IGM), grandmaster (GMM), and international master (IMM). As of November 2016, there are approximately 200 grandmasters in the world.

== Abilities ==
Researchers have looked to discover the differences between brains with superior memory and those with average memory both in structure and capabilities, and whether their capabilities are innate or developed. Some research has found that there are no fundamental differences between brains with superior memory and the average person. Instead many superior memorizers, like those in the World Memory Championships, use mnemonic learning strategies to practice preferential engagement of areas of the brain such as the hippocampus and the medial parietal and retrosplenial cortices which allows them to store and access more information in their working memory.

However, other research into the causal factors of superior memory found that such performance could derive from either the practice of mnemonic strategies or in some cases a natural superiority in memory efficiency. The research also concluded that for those with regular natural ability, the superior memory they gain from using mnemonic strategies is typically limited by the applicability of their strategy to the task at hand. However, users of mnemonic strategies often perform exceptionally well with "less meaningful materials such as numbers."

== Well-known competitors ==
Up-to-date world rankings can be found at the International Association of Memory statistics website.

=== World champions ===
- Dominic O'Brien (UK): 8x world memory champion (1991, 1993, 1995–97, 1999–2001)
- Jonathan Hancock (UK): world memory champion (1994)
- Andi Bell (UK): 3x world memory champion (1998, 2002–03)
- Clemens Mayer (Germany): 2x world memory champion (2005–06)
- Ben Pridmore (UK): 3x world memory champion (2004, 2008–09)
- Gunther Karsten (Germany): world memory champion (2007)
- Wang Feng (China): 2x world memory champion (2010–11)
- Jonas von Essen (Sweden): 2x world memory champion (2013–14)
- Munkhshur Narmandakh (Mongolia): 2x World Memory Champion (WMSC 2017, WMSC 2021), International Grandmaster of Memory, world record holder.
- Ryu Song I (DPRK): WMSC World Memory Champion (2019) and highest score of all-time of combined rankings
- Andrea Muzii (ITA): IAM World Memory Champion (2019) but 8th-best Non-Champion in combined rankings including WMSC results, first Gold Grandmaster, world record holder

=== Other ===
- Yanjaa Wintersoul (Mongolia, previously Sweden): international grandmaster, double world record holder.
- Shijir-Erdene Bat-Enkh (Mongolia): International Grandmaster, World Record Holder.
- Enkhshur Narmandakh (Mongolia): international grandmaster, world record holder.
- Lkhagvadulam Enkhtuya (Mongolia): international grandmaster, world record holder.
- Joshua Foer (US): author and USA memory champion (2006).
- Ed Cooke (UK): author, grandmaster, founder and CEO of Memrise.
- Marwin Wallonius (Sweden): international grandmaster, 2x Swedish champion, vice-world champion.
- Nelson Dellis (US): 5x USA memory champion (2011–12, 2014–15, 2021), grandmaster.
- Ron White (US): 2x USA memory champion (2009–10).
- Huang Shenghua (China): international grandmaster, vice-world champion.
- Shi Binbin (China): international grandmaster, 2x Chinese champion.
- Su Zehe (China): international grandmaster.
- Zou Lujian (China): grandmaster, world record achiever.
- Prateek Yadav (India): international grandmaster, 4x Indian champion.
- Ola Kare Risa (Norway): international grandmaster, Norwegian No. 1.
- Christian Schafer (Germany): international grandmaster.
- Katie Kermode (UK): world record holder in words, names and faces.
- Sengesamdan Ulziikhutag (Mongolia): international grandmaster.
- Purevjav Erdenesaikhan (Mongolia): international grandmaster, Mongolian champion, 2015 junior world champion.
- Takeru Aoki (Japan): Grandmaster of Memory, Japanese champion
- Daniel Tammet (UK): writer and autistic savant.
- Astrid Plessl: Austrian national champion and grandmaster.

== See also ==
- Anamonic
- Chunking (psychology)
- Eidetic memory
- Exceptional memory
- Haraguchi's mnemonic system
- Interference theory
- Linkword
- Memory
- Memory League
- Mentalism
- Method of loci
- Mnemonic dominic system
- Mnemonic goroawase system
- Mnemonic link system
- Mnemonic major system
- Mnemonic peg system
- Mnemonist
- Harry Lorayne
- Piphilology
- Serial position effect
- Spacing effect
- The Magical Number Seven, Plus or Minus Two
- Von Restorff effect
- Zeigarnik effect
