= Johannes Mallow =

German memory sportsman (born 1981)

Johannes “Hans/Hannes” Mallow (born June 7, 1981 Brandenburg an der Havel) is a German memory sportsman. Along with his post-split title in the IAM event in 2018, a disputed one where he would have ranked outside top 5 in the event both World events’ scores of that year were to be compiled into a single ranking, he has won the World Memory Championships once pre-split in 2012. He studied successfully Communication Technology at the Otto-von-Guericke University of Magdeburg and finalized his PhD thesis in 2016 at the University of Duisburg-Essen. He also works as a mind coach and scientific author.

== Victories ==
- 2018 IAM World Memory Champion [NON CHAMPION] in 2018 World events, with scores of the World Memory Sports Council (WMSC), the other memory sports governing body organizing World Championships, taken into account]
- 2017 Memory Champion of the IAM-AMSC Korea Open
- 2016 Memory Champion of the Regional German Open Memory Championship
- 2015 Memory Champion of Germany
- 2015 Extreme Memory Tournament Champion
- 2013 Runner-up at World Memory Championships
- 2013 Memory Champion of Germany
- 2012 World Memory Champion
- 2012 Memoriad - Binary Digits World Memory Champion
- 2012 Memory Champion of Germany
- 2011 Runner-up at Memory Championship of Germany
- 2010 Runner-up at World Memory Championships
- 2010 Memory Champion of Germany
- 2009 Runner-up at World Memory Championships
- 2008 Memory Champion of Germany
- 2008 Memory Champion of North Germany
- 2007 World Memory Champion in the discipline of Historical Dates
- 2007 Memory Champion of North Germany
- 2006 Memory Champion of North Germany

== Extinct world records ==
List of EXTINCT world records held (non of which are standing as of 1st of October 2019):

- Memorize 400 playing cards in 10 minutes (April 9, 2016 in Lübeck/Germany at the Regional German Open Memory Championship)
- Memorize 501 numbers in 5 minutes (December 1, 2013 in London/England at the World Memory Championship 2013)
- Memorize 1080 binary numbers in 5 minutes (September 22, 2013 in Gothenburg/Sweden at the Swedish Memory Open Championship 2013)
- Memorize 937 numbers in 15 minutes (September 22, 2013 in Gothenburg/Sweden at the Swedish Memory Open Championship 2013)
- Memorize 364 spoken numbers (September 22, 2013 in Gothenburg/Sweden at the Swedish Memory Open Championship 2013)
- Memorize 492 abstract images in 15 minutes (July 27, 2013 in Isny im Allgäu/Germany at the German Memory Championship 2013)
- Memorize 132 Historical Dates out of 140 in 5 minutes (September 25, 2011 in Gothenburg/Sweden at the Swedish Memory Open Championship 2011)

== Memory system ==
He currently uses the Method of loci. Many memory sportsmen use this method. His particular instance of the method uses 1,000 images with corresponding numbers, so that each combination of 3 digits corresponds to a unique image.

The brain is lazy, so we have to trick it. That's where routines and mindfulness come in.

There are certain techniques we can learn to use our memory in a way that makes it easier for us to remember things. One approach is to convert everything we want to learn into pictures and then link them to stories. If I want to remember a row of numbers, I assign a picture to each number from 0-9, with 5 being a farmer, for example, and 8 a loaf of bread. Of course, this method brings best results when the number series is a little longer.

Just to give you an example, I have the numbers 5, 8, 6, 7, and that’s not so easy to remember. But if I tell you a story about a farmer who harvests bread from a field, takes it to a butcher, and then the butcher makes potatoes out of it, it will stick better. It's a silly story, but because it’s exciting, funny or maybe even sad, you will remember it better than a series of abstract numbers.

Stories touch us emotionally, which is why we remember them better. This is because our ancestors already worked with pictures and stories over five thousand years ago. Writing and numbers, on the other hand, only date back a few thousand years, which is why our memory cannot handle them so well. So, if we want to remember information better, we have to try to transform it, and package it in an exciting, funny or visual way.

— Johannes Mallow, Interview by Lena von Holt, Are We Europe

https://www.areweeurope.com/stories/johannes-mallow-fshd
