= Mnemonist =

Person with the ability to recall large amounts of data

The title mnemonist refers to an individual with the ability to remember and recall unusually long lists of data, such as unfamiliar names, lists of numbers, entries in books, etc. Some mnemonists also memorize texts such as long poems, speeches, or even entire books of fiction or non-fiction. The term is derived from the term mnemonic, which refers to a strategy to support remembering (such as the method of loci or major system), but not all mnemonists report using mnemonics. Mnemonists may have superior innate ability to recall or remember, in addition to (or instead of) relying on techniques.

== Structure of mnemonic skills ==
While the innateness of mnemonists' skills is debated, the methods that mnemonists use to memorize are well-documented. Many mnemonists have been studied in psychology labs over the last century, and most have been found to use mnemonic devices. Currently, all memory champions at the World Memory Championships have said that they use mnemonic strategies, such as the method of loci, to perform their memory feats.

Skilled memory theory was proposed by K. Anders Ericsson and Bill Chase to explain the effectiveness of mnemonic devices in memory expertise. Generally, short-term memory has a capacity of seven items; however, in order to memorize long strings of unrelated information, this constraint must be overcome. Skilled memory theory involves three steps: meaningful encoding, retrieval structure, and speed-up.

=== Encoding ===
In encoding, information is encoded in terms of knowledge structures through meaningful associations. This may initially involve breaking down long lists into more manageable chunks that fall within the capacity of short term memory. Verbal reports of memory experts show a consistent grouping of three or four. A digit sequence 1-9-4-5, for example, can then be remembered as "the year World War Two ended". Luria reported that Solomon Shereshevsky used synesthesia to associate numbers and words as visual images or colors to encode the information presented to him, but Luria did not clearly distinguish between synesthesia and mnemonic techniques like the method of loci and number shapes.

Other subjects studied have used previous knowledge such as racing times or historical information to encode new information. This is supported by studies that have shown that previous knowledge about a subject will increase one's ability to remember it. Chess experts, for example, can memorize more pieces of a chess game in progress than a novice chess player. However, while there is some correlation between memory expertise and general intelligence, as measured by either IQ or the general intelligence factor, the two are by no means identical. Many memory experts have been shown to be average to above-average by these two measures, but not exceptional.

=== Retrieval ===
The next step is to create a retrieval structure by which the associations can be recalled. It serves the function of storing retrieval cues without having to use short term memory. It is used to preserve the order of items to be remembered. Verbal reports of memory experts show two prominent methods of retrieving information: hierarchical nodes and the method of loci. Retrieval structures are hierarchically organized and can be thought of as nodes that are activated when information is retrieved. Verbal reports have shown that memory experts have different retrieval structures. One expert clustered digits into groups, groups into supergroups, and supergroups into clusters of supergroups. However, by far the most common method of retrieval structure is the method of loci.

=== Method of loci ===
The method of loci is "the use of an orderly arrangement of locations into which one could place the images of things or people that are to be remembered." The encoding process happens in three steps. First, an architectural area, such as the houses on a street, must be memorized. Second, each item to be remembered must be associated with a separate image. Finally, this set of images can be distributed in a "locus", or place within the architectural area in a pre-determined order. Then, as one tries to recall the information, the mnemonists simply has to "walk" down the street, see each symbol, and recall the associated information. An example of mnemonists who used this method is Solomon Shereshevsky; he would use Gorky Street, his own street. When he read, each word would form a graphic image. He would then place this image in a place along the street; later, when he needed to recall the information, he would simply "stroll" down the street again to recall the necessary information. Neuroimaging studies have shown results that support the method of loci as the retrieval method in world-class memory performers. An fMRI recorded brain activity in memory experts and a control group as they were memorizing selected data. Previous studies have shown that teaching a control group the method of loci leads to changes in brain activation during memorization. Consistent with their use of the method of loci, memory experts had higher activity in the medial parietal cortex, retrosplenial cortex, and right posterior hippocampus; these brain areas have been linked to spatial memory and navigation. These differences were observable even when the memory experts were trying to memorize stimuli, such as snowflakes, where they showed no superior ability to the control group.

=== Acceleration ===
The final step in skilled memory theory is acceleration. With practice, time necessary for encoding and retrieval operations can be dramatically reduced. As a result, storage of information can then be performed within a few seconds. Indeed, one confounding factor in the study of memory is that the subjects often improve from day to day as they are tested over and over.

== Learned skill or innate ability ==
The innateness of expert performance in the memory field has been studied thoroughly by many scientists; it is a matter which has still not been definitively resolved.

=== Evidence for memory expertise as a learned skill ===
Much evidence exists which points towards memory expertise as a learned skill which can only be learned through hours of deliberate practice. Anecdotally, the performers in top memory competitions like the World Memory Championships and the Extreme Memory Tournament all deny any ability of a photographic memory; rather, these experts have averaged 10 years practicing their encoding strategies. Another piece of evidence which points away from an innate superiority of memory is the specificity of memory expertise in memorists. For example, though memory experts have an exceptional ability to remember digits, their ability to remember unrelated items which are more difficult to encode, such as symbols or snowflakes, is the same as that of an average person. The same holds true for memory experts in other fields: studies of mental calculators and chess experts show the same specificity for superior memory. In some cases, other types of memory, such as visual memory for faces, may even be impaired. Another piece of evidence of memory expertise as a learned ability is the fact that dedicated individuals can make exceptional memory gains when exposed to mnemonics and given a chance to practice. One subject, SF, a college student of average intelligence, was able to attain world-class memory performance after hundreds of hours of practice over two years. His memory, in fact, improved over 70 standard deviations, while his digit span, or memory span for digits, grew to 80 digits, which was higher than the digit span for all memory experts previously recorded. Similarly, adults of average intelligence taught encoding strategies also show large gains in memory performance. Finally, neuroimaging studies performed on memory experts and compared to a control group have found no systematic anatomical differences in the brain between memory experts and a control group. While it is true that there are activation differences between the brains of memory experts and a control group, they are due to the use of spatial techniques to form retrieval structures, not any structural differences.

=== Evidence for memory expertise as an innate ability ===
Much of the evidence for innate superiority of memory is anecdotal and is therefore rejected by scientists who have moved toward accepting only reproducible studies as evidence for elite performance. There have been exceptions, however, that do not fit skilled memory theory as proposed by Chase and Ericsson. Synesthetes, for example, show a memory advantage for material that induces their synesthesia over a control group. This advantage tends to be in retention of new information rather than learning. However, synesthetes are likely to have some brain differences which give them an innate advantage when it comes to memory.

Another group which may have some innate memory advantage are autistic savants. Unfortunately, many savants who have performed memory feats, such as Kim Peek, have not been rigorously studied; they do claim not to need to use encoding strategies. A recent imaging study of savants found that there are activation differences between savants and typically developing individuals; these cannot be explained by the method of loci as mnemonic savants do not tend to use encoding strategies for their memory. Savants activated the right inferior occipital areas of their brain, whereas control participants activated the left parietal region which is generally associated with attentional processes.

== Famous mnemonists ==
- Yanjaa Wintersoul: world record holder
- Datas (W.J.M. Bottle)
- Derren Brown
- Creighton Carvello
- Dominic O'Brien: 8x world memory champion (1991, 1993, 1995–97, 1999–01)
- Ben Pridmore: 3x world memory champion (2004, 2008–09)
- Harry Lorayne
- Edward Cyril De Hault Laston
- Rajan Mahadevan
- Kim Peek, the real-life inspiration for the character of Raymond in the film Rain Man
- Shass Pollak
- Solomon Shereshevskii, from AR Luria's The Mind of a Mnemonist
- Daniel Tammet
- Ed Cooke: author and grandmaster of memory
- Wang Feng: 2x world memory champion (2010–11)
- Jonas von Essen: 2x world memory champion (2013–14)
- Nelson Dellis: 6x USA memory champion (2011–12, 2014–15, 2021, 2024)
- Joshua Foer: author and USA memory champion (2006)
- Brad Williams

Memory sport contains a more comprehensive list of well-known memory athletes. The complete, up-to-date memory world rankings can be found at the International Association of Memory website.

== See also ==
- Funes the Memorious
- Hafiz (Qur'an)
- Hyperthymesia
- Mental calculator
- Memory sport
- Shas Pollak
