= List of world championships in mind sports =

This article gives a list of world championships in mind sports which usually represent the most prestigious competition for a specific board game, card game or mind sport. World championships can only be held for most games or mind sports with the ratification of an official body. Some Eastern games only have amateur world championships and separate professional competitions as can be seen for Go (list of professional Go tournaments).

== Mind Sports Olympiad All-round ==
World championships organized by Mind Sports Olympiad, that consist of competitions across multiple events to find the strongest games all-rounders.

Sport / Competition name	Competing entities	First held	Current holder	Last Held	Next	Held every
Decamentathlon World Championship	Individuals	1997	(England) Martyn Hamer	2019	Discontinued	One year
Abstract Games World Championship	Individuals	2008	(Estonia) Andres Kuusk	2025	2026	One year
Pentamind World Championship	Individuals	1997	(Estonia) Andres Kuusk	2025	2026	One year

== Classic/traditional board games ==
Major world championships for classic strategy board games, such as chess or go.

Category	Sport	Competition name	Competing entities	First held	Current holder	Last held	Next	Held every
Backgammon	Backgammon	Backgammon World Championship	Individuals	1967	2026 (United States) (Bulgaria) Petko Kostadinov	2026		One year
Chaturanga variants	Chess	World Chess Championship	Individuals	1886	(India) Gukesh Dommaraju	2024	2026	Two years
Chaturanga variants	Shogi	Meijin (shogi) (Note: The Meijin match is not considered as a world championship. It is listed because Meijin is one of the most prestigious shogi titles in Japan.)	Individuals	1937	(Japan) Sōta Fujii	2025	2026	One year
Chaturanga variants	Xiangqi	World Xiangqi Championship	Individuals	1990	(Vietnam) Lai Ly Huynh	2025	2027	Two years
Draughts	International draughts	Draughts World Championship	Individuals	1885	(Ukraine) Yuri Anikeev	2023	2024	One year
Draughts	English draughts	World Checkers Championship	Individuals	1840	(Italy) Sergio Scarpetta (3-Move) (Italy) Matteo Bernini (GAYP)	2024; 2024	2026; 2026	Two years
Draughts	Brazilian draughts and Russian draughts	World Draughts-64 Championship	Individuals	1985; 1998; 1993	Nikolay Struchkov (Classic); Igor Mikhalchenko (Rapid); Roman Shchukin (Blitz)	2024; 2024; 2024	2025	One year
Draughts	Italian draughts	Italian Draughts World Championship	Individuals	2024	(Italy) Damiano Sciuto	2024	?	?
Go	Go	Ing Cup (Note: There is no official world championship in professional Go. The Ing Cup is one of the most influential professional Go tournaments.)	Individuals	1988	(Japan) Ryo Ichiriki	2024	?	Four years
Five in a row	Gomoku	Gomoku World Championship	Individuals	1989	(Czech Republic) Pavel Laube	2025	2027	Two years
Five in a row	Renju	Renju World Championship	Individuals	1989	(Japan) Tomoharu Nakayama	2025	2027	Two years
Reversi	Othello	World Othello Championship	Individuals	1977	(Japan) Yasushi Nagano	2023	2024	One year

== Classic/traditional card/tile games ==
World championships in Traditional card games and tile-based games.

Category	Sport	Competition name	Competing entities	First held	Current holder	Last held	Next	Held every
Contract bridge	Contract bridge	Bermuda Bowl	Teams (Open)	1950	Switzerland	2025	2027	Two years
Contract bridge	Contract bridge	Venice Cup	Teams (Women)	1937	Israel	2023	2025	Two years
Contract bridge	Contract bridge	d'Orsi Senior Bowl	Teams (Seniors)	2001	Denmark	2023	2025	Two years
Dominoes	Dominoes	World Championship Domino Tournament	Individuals	1976	(United States) Chris Authement	2019	2020	One year
Dominoes	Dominoes	Domino World Championship	Individuals	1995	(Germany) Torsten Fornefeld	2023	2024	One year
Mahjong	Mahjong	World Mahjong Championship	Individuals	2002	(China) Zhou Yong	2019	2021	Two years
Mahjong	Riichi mahjong	World Riichi Championship	Individuals	2014	(Japan) Kotaro Uchikawa	2025	2028	Three years
Poker	Poker	World Series of Poker Main Event	Individuals	1970	(United States) Michael Mizrachi	2025	2026	One year
Skat	Skat	World Skat Championship	Individuals	1978	(Germany) Deni Lazicic (Men) (Germany) Angelika Pullig (Women)	2022	2024	Two years
Skat	Skat	World Skat Championship	Teams	1978	(Germany) ISPAWORLD and Friends	2022	2024	Two years
Skat	Skat	World Skat Championship	Nations	1978	Canada	2022	2024	Two years

== Mental disciplines ==
Competitions using mental tests.

Sport	Competition name	Competing entities	First held	Current holder	Next	Held every
Memory	World Memory Championships	Individuals	1991	(China) Huang Jinyao	2026	One year
Mental calculation	Mental Calculation World Cup	Individuals	2004	(India) Aaryan Nitin Shukla (2024)	2026	Two years
Mental calculation	MSO Mental Calculation World Championship	Individuals	1998	Kaloyan Geshev (2024)	2025	One year
Mental calculation	Junior Mental Calculation World Championship	Individuals (age restricted)	2013	(2023) Andrej Zivanovic (Juniors 1); Kaloyan Geshev (Juniors 2); Abhilakshya Arora (Seniors)	2024	One year
Mental calculation	Calculation League	Individuals	2024 (Spring)	Wenzel Grüß (gold); Aaryan Nitin Shukla (silver); Kaloyan Geshev (bronze)	2024 (fall)	Twice per year
Speedcubing (Rubik's Cube)	Rubik's WCA World Championship	Cube 3x3x3	1982	(China) Wang Yiheng	2027	Two years
Sudoku	World Sudoku Championship	Individuals	2006	(China) Ming Letian	2025	One year
Sudoku	World Sudoku Championship	Teams	2007	China	2025	One year
Speed Jigsaw Puzzling	World Jigsaw Puzzle Championships	Solo	2019	(Norway) Kristin Thuv	2025	One year
Speed Jigsaw Puzzling	World Jigsaw Puzzle Championships	Pairs	2019	(Czech Republic) Tereza Koptíková / Markéta Freislerová	2025	One year
Speed Jigsaw Puzzling	World Jigsaw Puzzle Championships	Teams	2019	(United States) Andrea Peng / Jeanne Roiter / Cathy Roiter / Becca Taylor	2025	One year

== Modern board games ==
Competitions in abstract strategy games and other modern board games.

Games made for 2 players:

Sport	Competition name	Competing entities	First held	Current holder	Next	Held every
Arimaa	Arimaa World Championship	Individuals	2004	(United States) Mathew Brown (2023)	2024	One year
Entropy/Hyle	Entropy World Championship	Individuals	1997	(Estonia) Andres Kuusk (2025)	2026	One year
Kamisado	Kamisado World Championship	Individuals	2011	(England) David Pearce (2024)	2025	One Year
Lines of Action	LoA World Championship	Individuals	1997	(Estonia) Andres Kuusk (2025)	2026	One year
Stratego	Stratego World Championship	Individuals	1997	(Netherlands) Vince van Geffen (2024)	2025	One year
Twilight Struggle	International Twilight Struggle League	Individuals	2005	(Czech Republic) Tomas Tvaroh (2024)	2025	One year
Twixt	TwixT World Championship	Individuals	1997	(France) Florian Jamain (2024)	2025	One Year

Games supporting 3 or more players:

Sport	Competition name	Competing entities	First held	Current holder	Next	Held every
Diplomacy	World Diplomacy Convention	Individuals	1988	(Canada) (France) Nicolas Sahuguet (2024)	2025	One year
Hare and Tortoise	Hare and Tortoise World Championships	Individuals	1997	(Estonia) Madli Mirme (2025)	2026	One year
Monopoly	Monopoly World Championships	Individuals	1973	(Italy) Nicolò Falcone	TBD	No regular schedule
Settlers of Catan	Catan World Championships	Individuals	2002	(New Zealand) Hamish Dean (2022)	2024	Two years
4 games	German Board Game Championship	Teams (4 players)	1984	(Germany) FeSaJoTo (2025)	2026	One year
4 games	Dutch Board Game Championship	Teams (4 players)	2000	(Netherlands) Desda (2024)	2025	One year
4 games	Europe Masters - European Board Game Championship	Teams (4 players)	1988	(Germany) Brettspielverein Bindlach – Die Outlawkumpels (2024)	2025	One year

== Modern card games ==
Competitions in collectible card games and other modern card games.

Sport	Competition name	Competing entities	First held	Current holder	Last held	Next	Held every
Magic: The Gathering	Magic: The Gathering World Championship	Individuals	1994	(Spain) Javier Dominguez	2024	2025	One year
Pokémon Trading Card Game	Pokémon World Championships	Individuals	2004	(Japan) Sakuya Ota (Junior) (United States) Evan Pavelski (Senior) (United States) Fernando Cifuentes (Master)	2024	2025	One year
Yu-Gi-Oh! Trading Card Game	Yu-Gi-Oh! World Championships	Individuals	2003	(United States) Paul Aronson (N/A) Jian Yu Jian (Duel Links) (Germany) (Netherlands) snipehunters (Master Duel)	2023	2024	One year
Wizard Card Game	Wizard World Championship	Individuals	2010	(Germany) Alexander Kube	2023	2024	One year

== Speaking competitions ==
World championships in speaking.

Sport	Competition name	Competing entities	First held	Current holder	Next	Held every
Auctioneering	World Livestock Auctioneer Championship	Individuals	1963	(United States) Jared Miller (2018)	2019	One year
Debating	World Universities Debating Championship	Pairs	1979	(England) Mark Rothery & Aniket Chakravorty (2024)	2025	One year
Debating	World Schools Debating Championships	Nations	1988	Scotland (2024)	2025	One year
Debating (Spanish)	World Universities Debating Championship in Spanish; Campeonato Mundial Universitario de Debate en Español	Individuals	2011	(Colombia) Jessica Zapata (2024)	2025	One year
Debating (Spanish)	World Universities Debating Championship in Spanish; Campeonato Mundial Universitario de Debate en Español	Pairs	2011	(Chile) Mattias Durán & (Mexico) Marcela Goméz (2024)	2025	One year
Debating (Portuguese)	World Debating Championship in Portuguese; Campeonato Mundial de Debate em Língua Portuguesa	Individuals	2018	(Brazil) Jess Peixoto (2021)	TBD	TBD
Debating (Portuguese)	World Debating Championship in Portuguese; Campeonato Mundial de Debate em Língua Portuguesa	Pairs	2018	(Brazil) Jess Peixoto & Bernardo Rabelo (2021)	TBD	TBD

== Tile games ==
World championships held in tile-based games include:

Sport	Competition name	Competing entities	First held	Current holder	Next	Held every
Carcassonne	Carcassonne World Championship	Individuals	2006	(China) Xiangyu Qin (2025)	2026	One year
Continuo	Continuo World Championship	Individuals	1997	(England) David M. Pearce (2016)	2017	One year
Saboteur	Saboteur World Championship	Individuals	2016	(Germany) Alexander Mischke (2022)	2023	One year
Tantrix	Tantrix World Championship (online)	Individuals	1998	(Germany) Richard Knese (2023)	2024	One year
Tantrix	Tantrix World Open (real tiles)	Individuals	2009	(Hungary) Attila Mikulán (2024)	2025	One year (irregular)

== Word games ==
World championships in word games.

Sport	Competition name	Competing entities	First held	Current holder	Next	Held every
Scrabble (English)	World Scrabble Championship	Individuals	1991	(Australia) David Eldar (2023)	2024	Two years; one year since 2013
Scrabble (Spanish)	Spanish World Scrabble Championship	Individuals	1997	(France) Serge Emig (2019)	2020	One year
Scrabble (French)	French World Scrabble Championships Duplicate	Individuals	1972	(New Zealand) Nigel Richards (2019)	2020	One year
Scrabble (French)	French World Scrabble Championship Classic	Individuals	2006	(Canada) Francis Desjardins (2019)	2020	One year

== Information technology ==
World championships in competitive programming.

Sport	Competition name	Competing entities	First held	Current holder	Next	Held every
Competitive programming	Topcoder Open	Individuals	2001	(Belarus) Gennady Korotkevich (2022)	2023	once a year
Corewars	ICWS	Individuals/teams	1985	?	?	yearly

== Quizzing ==
Quizzing competitions organized by the private company International Quizzing Assoc.

Sport	Competition name	Competing entities	First held	Current holder	Next	Held every
Quiz	World Quizzing Championship	Individuals	2003	(United States) Victoria Groce (2024)	2025	yearly

== See also ==
- Esports
  - List of esports leagues and tournaments
- Mind Sports Organisation
- International Association of Memory
- World Memory Championships
- World Junior Memory Championships
- World Mind Sports Games
- Mind Sports Olympiad
- International Philosophy Olympiad
- World cup competition
- World championship
- List of world sports championships
- List of world cups and world championships for juniors and youth
