= Clemens Mayer =

German memory champion

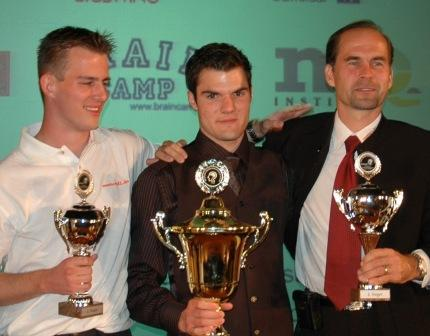
Clemens Mayer (middle) at the German Memory Championships

Clemens Mayer (born September 25, 1985, in Brannenburg) is a German memory sports competitor. He was World Memory Champion in 2005 and 2006. At the age of 19 years and 10 months, he became the youngest-ever world memory champion in 2005. 12 years later, in 2017, then-18-year- and 11-month-old Mongolian Munkhshur Narmandakh became the youngest champion ever and Mayer lost this record. Narmandakh lost this record to Wei Qinru who won the 2018 world championships at age 14.

He uses the method of loci. He originally intended to be an Olympic runner, but decided to go into memory sports after watching Gunther Karsten on German television. Since participating in the South German Memory Championship on 24 June 2007, he did not compete in any championship of memory sports.
