= Gunther Karsten =

German memory sport competitor and author

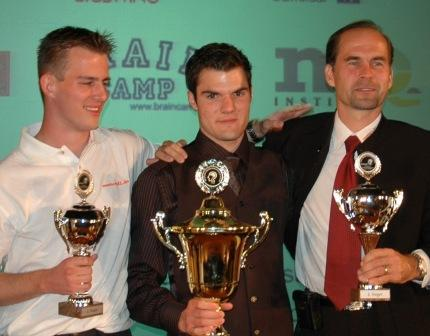
Gunther Karsten at the German Memory Championships (right)

Gunther Karsten (born 23 September 1961) is a German memory sport competitor and author.

== Biography ==
Karsten graduated in chemistry and in microbiology. He runs a translation agency for patents as regular occupation. Besides, he is a leading memory coach and offers seminars on mental-, learning- and memory training. Gunther is married to former memory competitor Michaela Buchvaldová-Karsten. He has published three memory related books.

He became German Memory Champion 7-times in a row from 1998 to 2004 until he was defeated by his compatriot Clemens Mayer in 2005. In 2007, Gunther was crowned the World Memory Champion. He set world records in several disciplines. For example, he held the record in One Hour Numbers, in which he was able to memorize 1949 digits within one hour, until 2009. He became vice world champion in 2001, 2005 and 2006, furthermore World Team Champion with the German team in 2005 and 2006.

Since 1985, he is a member of the high IQ society Mensa. In 2002, he founded the mnemonic supporting club MemoryXL e.V. together with other memory competitors and was its president from 2002 to 2006.

He has also supported young memory competitors, including Christiane Stenger, who graduated from high school in 2003 at a young age.

He competed in Memoriad 2008 World Mental Olympics and won the three categories of memory in Istanbul. He was crowned with titles of "Memoriad 2008 Speed Cards World Memory Champion", "Memoriad 2008 Numbers Marathon World Memory Champion" and "Memoriad 2008 Binary Digits World Memory Champion".

== Bibliography ==
- Erfolgsgedächtnis: Wie Sie sich Zahlen, Namen, Fakten, Vokabeln einfach besser merken. Goldmann, Munich 2004. ISBN 978-3-442-16473-8
- Lernen wie ein Weltmeister. Goldmann, Munich 2007. ISBN 978-3-442-39112-7
- So lernen Sieger: Die 50 besten Lerntipps 2012. ISBN 978-3-442-39226-1
