= Leopold Sekongo =

Dutch draughts player of Ivorian origin (born 1969)

Leopold Sekongo (born 25 September 1969) is a Dutch draughts player of Ivorian origin. He was once Champion de Côte d'Ivoire.

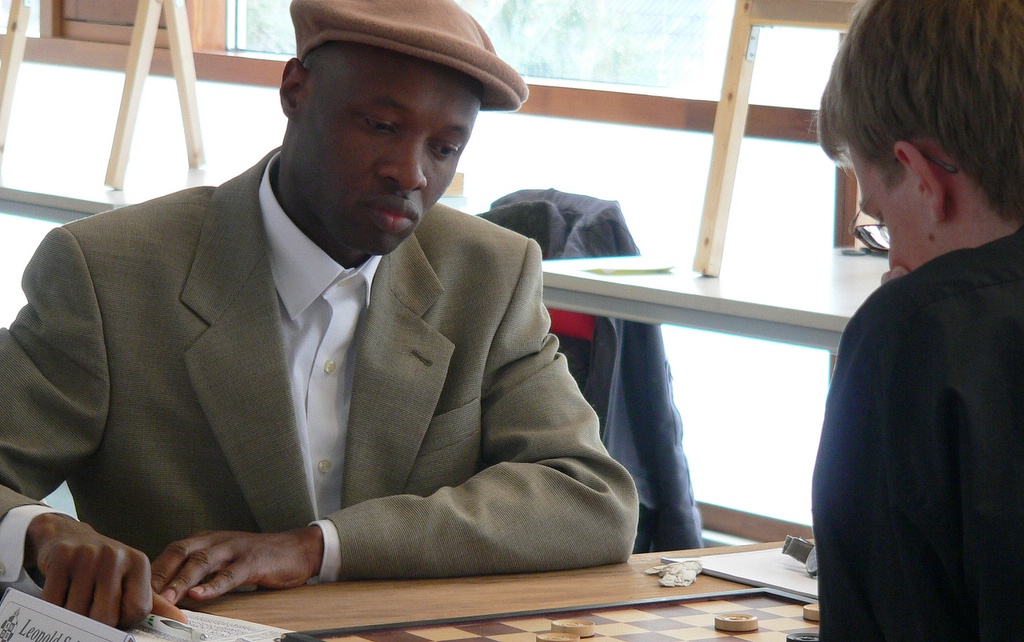
Leopold Sekongo plays with Johan Sterrenburg, Dutch Championship, 2006
