= International Association of Memory =

- Formation: 5 June 2016; 10 years ago
- Type: International organization
- Headquarters: Munich, Germany
- Website: www.iam-memory.org

The International Association of Memory (IAM) is an international organization that connects the various national memory sport federations and acts as a governing body of international memory competition. The IAM was founded on 5 July 2016 and has its headquarters in Munich, Germany.

The organization was originally founded by a subset of memory competitors and organizers who had previously been involved in competitions run by the World Memory Sports Council (WMSC), the memory sport organizing body which hosted the first World Memory Championships in 1991. 45 competitors and arbiters signed their names to the initial announcement letter. The IAM carried over event structure, rankings, and titles from prior WMSC competitions. Following its inception, the IAM has maintained its own ranking system distinct from that of the WMSC.

The organization describes itself as a "worldwide federation with the overarching vision of bringing memory sports to everybody and providing a free and democratic environment for the memory community." In December 2018, the IAM elected its first board, which consists of 10 members, two from each of the five participating continents.

== Competitions ==
The first IAM competition took place in San Diego, California in 2016, in partnership with Memory League. Its first World Memory Championship took place in Jakarta, Indonesia, in December 2017. The IAM hosted its second annual World Memory Championship in Vienna, Austria, in December 2018.

Traditional IAM events are largely identical to the events originally created by the WMSC. The World Memory Championship, for example, is a three-day competition consisting of the following 10 events: 15-minute Names & Faces, 30-minute Binary, 1-hour Numbers, 5-minute Images, 5-minute Numbers, 5-minute Dates, 1-hour Cards, 15-minute Words, Spoken Numbers, and Speed Cards. In 2017, the IAM replaced the 15-minute abstract images event used by the WMSC with a 5-minute concrete images event.

The IAM has hosted championships in the US, UK, Germany, Spain, Sweden, Denmark, Indonesia, France, Canada, Austria, Egypt, Libya, China, India, Mongolia, Australia, Korea, Japan, Philippines, Singapore, and Taiwan. A full listing of competitions, results, rankings, and national and world records can be found on the IAM's statistics website.

Building on the WMSC model, the IAM instituted a new world ranking system, which incorporates competitors' three most recent competitions rather than only using their highest-scoring competition. The organization has also imposed a "levels" system and adjusted their metrics for the Grand Master of Memory title.

== Partnerships ==
In addition to their traditional, 10-discipline memory championships, the IAM partners with Memory League to offer competitions which are entirely digital, have head-to-head matches, and are composed of shorter disciplines. The five Memory League disciplines are one-minute memorization of names, words, images, numbers, and cards.

== See also ==
- Grand Master of Memory
- List of world championships in mind sports
- Memory sport
- Method of loci
- Mnemonic major system
- Mnemonist
- USA Memory Championship
