= World Junior Memory Championships =

The World Junior Memory Championships (WJMC) runs as a subset of the World Memory Championships (WMC).

All competitors need to be between 13 and 17 years old to qualify. For many countries, in addition to age requirements, one needs to go through a series of regional and national qualification competitions before they can apply for WJMC. The recent champions are from Mongolia, China and Germany.

== Recent Championships ==
Year	Location	Champion	Nationality	Points
2008	Manama, Bahrain	Dorothea Seitz	German	3868
2009	London, England	Dorothea Seitz	German	5552
2010	Guangzhou, China	YANG Hong	Chinese	4621
2011	Guangzhou, China	WANG Diandian GMM	Chinese	4745
2012	London, England	Konstantin SKUDLER	German	3667
2013	Croydon, London, England	Namuuntuul BAT-ERDENE GMM	Mongolian	5568
2014	Haikou, China	Enkhmunkh ERDENEBATKHAAN IGM	Mongolian	5292
2015	Chengdu, China	Purevjav ERDENESAIKHAN GMM IGM	Mongolian	6404
2016	Singapore	Munkhshur NARMANDAKH	Mongolian	6770
2017	China	Lkhagvadulam ENKHTUYA	Mongolian	7491
2018	China	WEI Qinru	Chinese	7946
2019	China	WEI Qinru	Chinese	9091
