= Andi Bell =

British mnemonist

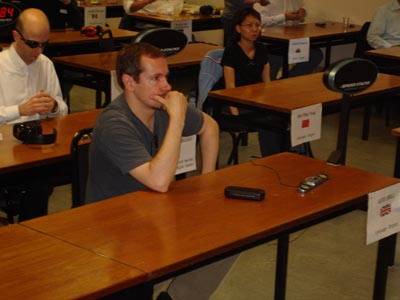
Andi Bell at WMC 2006

Andi Bell (born 1972) is a three-time winner of the World Memory Championships. He used a method similar to method of loci.
