= Jonathan Hancock =

British world memory champion

Jonathan Bruce Hancock is an author, broadcaster, and memory expert. He is best known for breaking two Guinness World Records on memory and becoming the inaugural World Student Memory Champion, and later the World Memory Champion.

He has authored 15 books on memory and learning, founded the Junior Memory Championship, and spent 15 years working as a radio presenter on BBC Radio Oxford.

== Early life and career ==
He was born in northeast England, on 12 February 1972, but moved at an early age to North Yorkshire where he spent his early childhood, and then to Nunthorpe, a suburb of Middlesbrough. After school, he did charity work in Australia before moving to Oxford to study English at Christ Church, Oxford University.

At age 16, Hancock set the world record for memorising six shuffled packs of cards, or 312 cards in total. In 1993, he broke the world record for memorising cards in the fastest time at two minutes and five seconds.

In August 1997, he began hosting a morning radio show for BBC Radio Oxford.

Hancock later spent ten years working in primary schools, as a teacher, deputy headteacher and acting headteacher.

Hancock has worked as a memory consultant and writer for a number of TV companies. He has been the resident memory expert for all six series of the Channel 4 programme 'Child Genius'.
