= Dominic O'Brien =

British memory champion (born 1957)

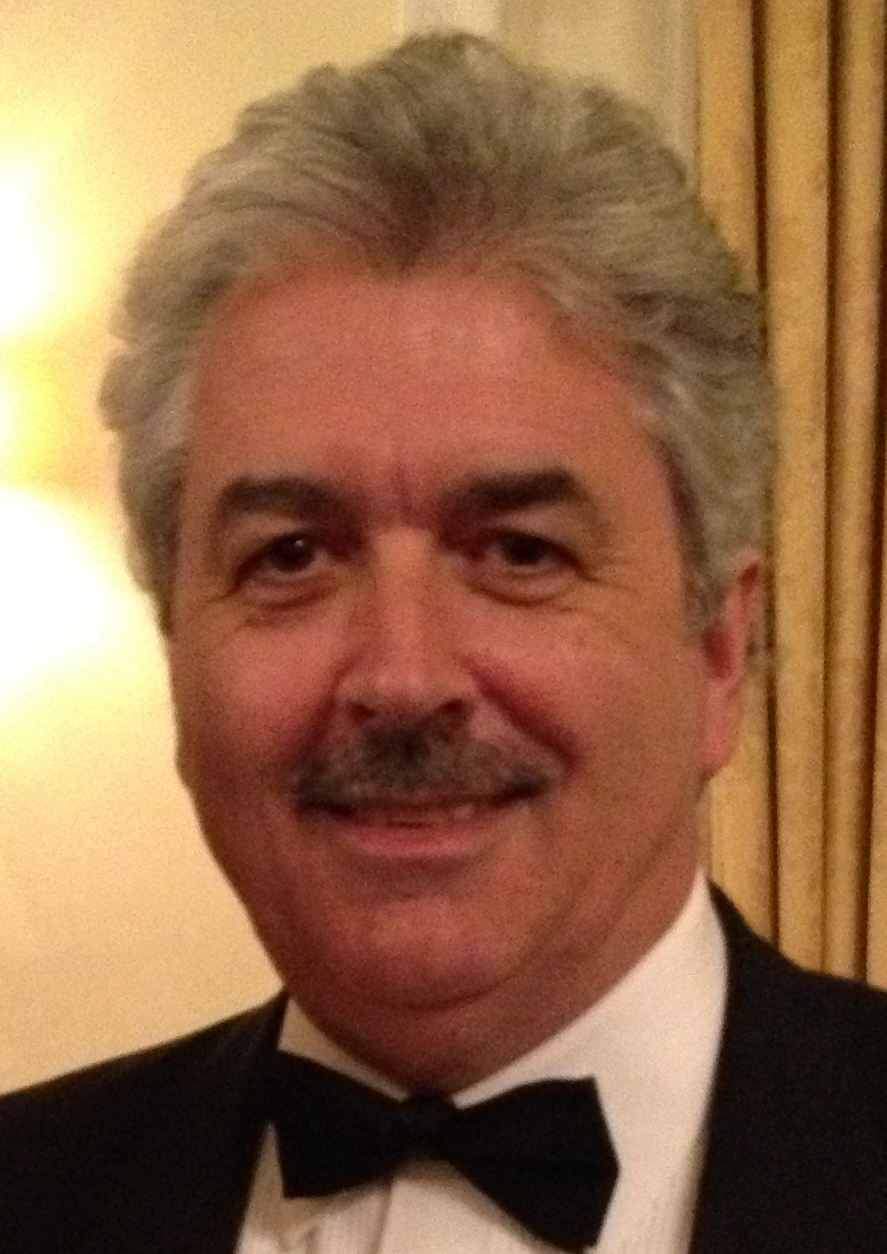
- Dominic O'Brien
- Born: 10 August 1957 (age 69)
- Known for: Author of memory-related books

Dominic O'Brien (10 August 1957) is a British mnemonist and an author of memory-related books. He is the eight time World Memory Champion and works as a trainer for Peak Performance Training.

He began developing his mnemonic techniques in 1987 when he saw Creighton Carvello memorise a pack of 52 playing cards in less than three minutes on the BBC television programme Record Breakers. To memorise numbers, O'Brien developed the mnemonic Dominic system, which is similar to the Major System. He has written books about memorisation techniques such as How to Develop a Perfect Memory, Quantum Memory Power, Learn to Remember, How to Pass Exams, The Winning Hand, and The Amazing Memory Box.

He gives lectures, and has been seen on television programmes such as The Human Body.

Dominic O'Brien had an entry in the Guinness Book of Records for his 1 May 2002 feat of committing to memory a random sequence of 2808 playing cards (54 packs) after looking at each card only once. He was able to correctly recite their order, making only eight errors, four of which he immediately corrected when told he was wrong.

== Bibliography ==
- How to Develop a Perfect Memory (1993) ISBN 1-857931-06-8
- How to Pass Exams (6 April 1995) ISBN 0-7472-5047-2
- Super Memory Power (Books 1–4) (1997)
- Learn to Remember (2000) ISBN 1-900131-93-5
- Quantum Memory Power (Jan 2001) ISBN 1-905453-66-3
- The Amazing Memory Box (27 September 2001) ISBN 1-903296-30-7
- Never Forget a Number or a Date (July 2002) ISBN 0-8118-3635-5
- Never Forget a Name or Face (Sep 2002) ISBN 0-8118-3634-7
- Never Forget a Speech (21 August 2003) ISBN 1-904292-50-X
- Never Forget Facts and Figures (21 August 2003) ISBN 1-904292-51-8
- The Amazing Memory Kit (13 October 2005) ISBN 1-84483-168-X
- How to Develop a Brilliant Memory Week by Week (Nov 2005) ISBN 1-84483-153-1
- How to Improve Your Memory (16 February 2010)
- You Can Have an Amazing Memory (May 2011) ISBN 978-1-907486-97-5
- The Brilliant Memory Tool Kit (5 June 2012) ISBN 978-1-780281-19-3
