= Ben Pridmore =

British mnemonist (born 1976)

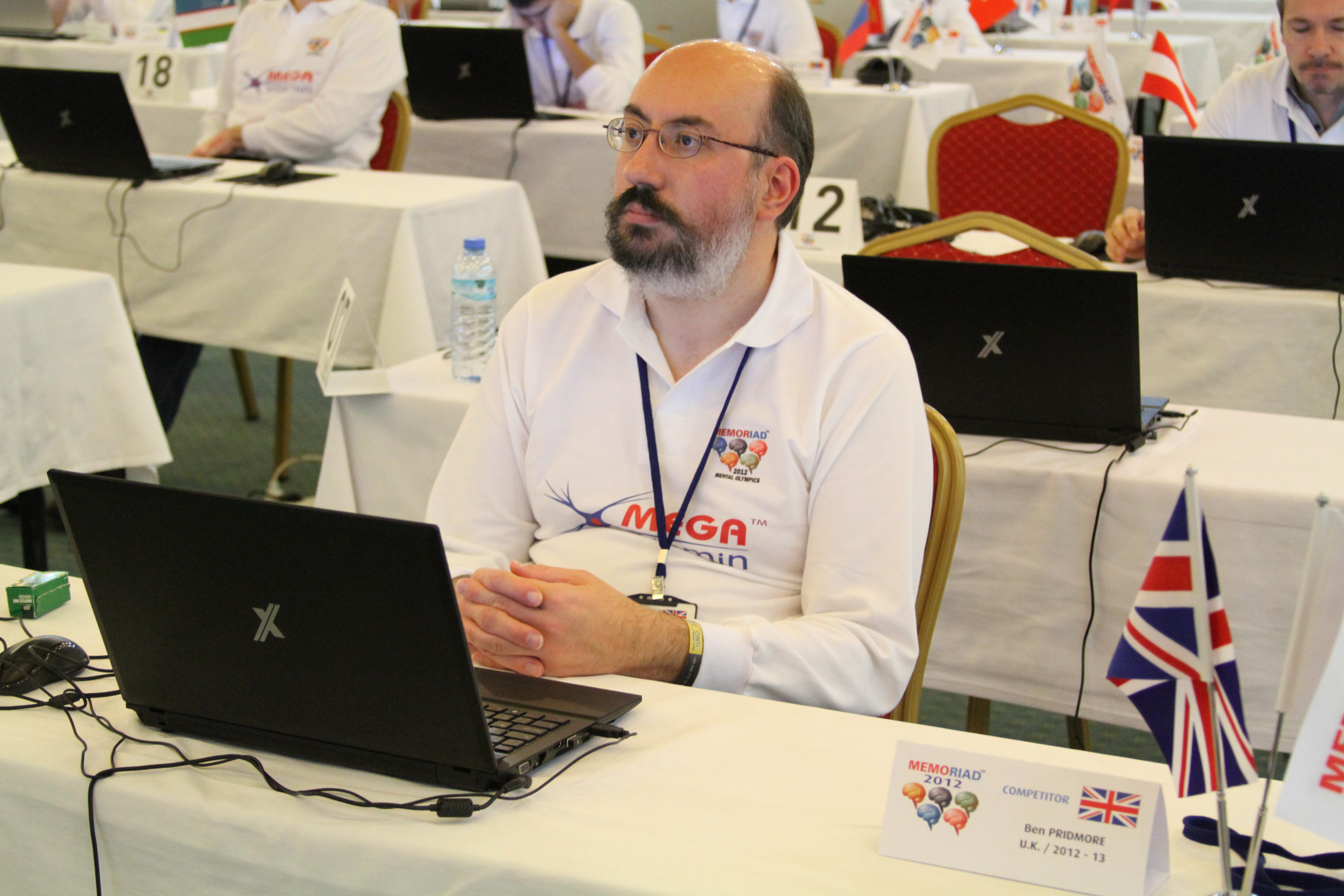
- Pridmore at Memoriad World Mental Olympic 2012
- Born: 14 October 1976 (age 49); Boston, United Kingdom
- Occupations: Accountant, World Memory Champion
- Known for: World Memory Champion

Ben Pridmore (born 14 October 1976) is a former world memory champion, memory sport competitor and accountant.

== Achievements ==
Pridmore is a three-time World Memory Champion winning the title 2004, 2008 and 2009. From Derby in the United Kingdom, Pridmore achieved this by winning a 10-discipline competition, the World Memory Championship, which has taken place every year since 1991. He has also earned the prestigious title of Master of Memory.

He held the official world record for memorizing the order of a randomly shuffled 52-card deck, and has memorised a pack in a time of 24.68 seconds on television. Pridmore's victory at the 2009 World Championship was his eighth consecutive memory competition win since coming second at the 2007 World Championship. He is the title holder for the UK Memory Champion for the years 2007–2011 and 2013 and Welsh Open Memory Champion 2009–2012 and 2014.

Besides memory sports he is famous for his mental calculation skills and took part in the Mental Calculation World Cup in 2004, 2006 and 2010. He has also won several medals at the Mind Sports Olympiad including becoming the 2001 World Champion at the ten disciplined mind sport competition the decamentathlon including also chess and reversi.

He also participated in the Memoriad World Mental Olympics in the year 2012 in Antalya and won one gold medal with the title "Memoriad Speed Cards World Memory Champion".

He is thought to have an IQ of 159 putting him in the genius range. He was prominently featured in the music video for DJ Shadow's single "Scale It Back".

Since 2022 he is also competing in Microsoft Excel esports competitions. He qualified for the Finals of the UK Excel Championship in 2025, where he finished 9th.

== Method ==
Like most memory experts, he creates a mental story, comprises a sequence of images in a variation of the Mnemonic Major System. In Pridmore's system for cards, two cards are represented as a three-letter word by the first consonant derived from the suits, the vowel from the first card's number, and the final consonant from the second card's number. For example, an ace of hearts and a two of clubs = "fan" with his predetermined letter associations for a total of 2704 unique images. Numbers are represented similarly with the first digit a consonant, vowel, and third consonant respectively meriting 1000 images; binary is the same with chunks of 4 numbers being given a single letter representation and used in the same fashion.

Using these words, Pridmore often creates a story using his old school, Queen Elizabeth's Grammar School, Horncastle as the framework for these memory sequences. This style of memorizing is known as the method of loci, sometimes known as a memory palace.
