= Wang Feng (mnemonist) =

Chinese mnemonist

Wang Feng (born 1990) is a Chinese mnemonist, the two-time winner of the World Memory Championships and the first non-European to win the title.

On December 5, 2010 he won the 19th World Memory Championships in Guangzhou, China with a record score of 9486 points, taking him to the top of the world rankings.

In December 2011, he won the 20th World Memory Championships again in Guangzhou, China with a score of 8477 points (in line with 2011 Millennium Scoring Adjustments) retaining his number one world ranking.
