= World Memory Championships =

Annual memory competition

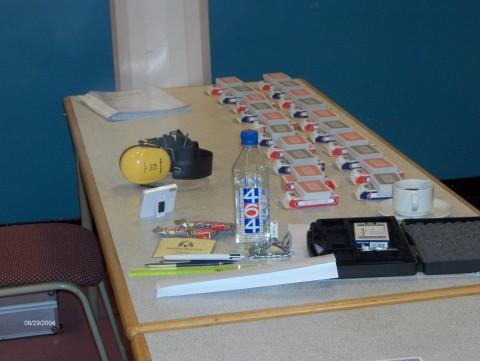
The cards to be used in the competition

The World Memory Championships is an organized competition of memory sports in which competitors memorize as much information as possible within a given period of time. The championship has taken place annually since 1991, with the exception of 1992. It was originated by Tony Buzan and co founded by Tony Buzan and Ray Keene. It continues to be organized by the World Memory Sports Council (WMSC), which was jointly founded by Tony Buzan and Ray Keene. In 2016, due to a dispute between some players and the WMSC, the International Association of Memory (IAM) was launched. From 2017 onward, both organizations have hosted their own world championships.

The current WMSC world champion is Naranzul Otgon-Ulaan of Mongolia. The current IAM world champion is Vishvaa Rajakumar of India.

== Format ==
The World Championships consist of ten different disciplines, where the competitors have to memorize as much as they can in a period of time:

1. One-hour numbers (23712892....)
2. 5-minute numbers
3. Spoken numbers, read out one per second
4. 30-minute binary digits (011100110001001....)
5. One-hour playing cards (as many decks of cards as possible)
6. 15-minute random lists of words (house, playing, orphan, encyclopedia....)
7. 15-minute names and faces
8. 5-minute historic dates (fictional events and historic years)
9. 15-minute abstract images (WMSC, black and white randomly generated spots) / 5-minute random images (IAM, concrete images)
10. Speed cards - Always the last discipline. Memorize the order of one shuffled deck of 52 playing cards as fast as possible.

== Venues and winners ==
World Champions (1991-2016)

#	Year	Venue	Winner
1	1991	London	(England) Dominic O'Brien
2	1993	London	(England) Dominic O'Brien
3	1994	London	(England) Jonathan Hancock
4	1995	London	(England) Dominic O'Brien
5	1996	London	(England) Dominic O'Brien
6	1997	London	(England) Dominic O'Brien
7	1998	London	(England) Andi Bell
8	1999	London	(England) Dominic O'Brien
9	2000	London	(England) Dominic O'Brien
10	2001	London	(England) Dominic O'Brien
11	2002	London	(England) Andi Bell
12	2003	Kuala Lumpur	(England) Andi Bell
13	2004	Manchester	(England) Ben Pridmore
14	2005	Oxford	(Germany) Clemens Mayer
15	2006	London	(Germany) Clemens Mayer
16	2007	Manama	(Germany) Gunther Karsten
17	2008	Manama	(England) Ben Pridmore
18	2009	London	(England) Ben Pridmore
19	2010	Guangzhou	(China) Wang Feng
20	2011	Guangzhou	(China) Wang Feng
21	2012	London	(Germany) Johannes Mallow
22	2013	London	(Sweden) Jonas von Essen
23	2014	Haikou	(Sweden) Jonas von Essen
24	2015	Chengdu	(United States) Alex Mullen
25	2016^{*}	Singapore	(United States) Alex Mullen

=== WMSC world champions (2017–present) ===
WMSC (World Memory Sports Council)

#	Year	Venue	Winner	Combined Rankings
26	2017	Shenzhen	(Mongolia) Munkhshur Narmandakh	Non-Champion
27	2018	Hong Kong	(China) Wei Qinru	Champion
28	2019	Wuhan	(North Korea) Ryu Song I	Champion
29	2020	Karachi§	(Pakistan) Emma Alam	-
30	2021	Ulaanbaatar§	(Mongolia) Munkhshur Narmandakh	-
31	2022	Ulaanbaatar§	(Mongolia) Tenuun Tamir	-
32	2023	Sanya	(China) Huang Jinyao	Champion
33	2024	Istanbul	(Mongolia) Enkhjargal Uuriintsolmon	Champion
34	2025	Ho Chi Minh City	(Mongolia) Naranzul Otgon-Ulaan	Champion

=== IAM world champions (2017–present) ===
International Association of Memory

#	Year	Venue	Winner	Combined Rankings
1	2017	Jakarta	(United States) Alex Mullen	Champion
2	2018	Vienna	(Germany) Johannes Mallow	Non-Champion
3	2019	Zhuhai	(Italy) Andrea Muzii	Non-Champion
-	2020	Competition Not Held		
-	2021	Competition Not Held		
-	2022	Competition Not Held		
4	2023	Mumbai	(Mongolia) Tenuun Tamir	Non-Champion
5	2024	Lund	(Italy) Enrico Marraffa	Non-Champion
6	2025	Mumbai	(India) Vishvaa Rajakumar	Non-Champion

* – The 2016 World Championships was hosted by the WMSC and was the first world championship not recognized by the IAM, who did not host their own world championship that year.

- § – Athletes generally competed in their respective countries given COVID-19 restrictions, with results combined to determine the world champion.

== Records ==
Up-to-date lists of world and national records can be found on the statistics websites of the IAM and WMSC. The best of them are listed in the following table.

Discipline	Record	Athlete	Event
Hour numbers	4620 digits	(North Korea) Ryu Song I	WMSC World Championship 2019
5-minute numbers	642 digits	(China) Wei Qinru	IMO Korea Open Memory Championship 2024
Spoken numbers	660 digits	(China) Hu Xueyan	WMSC World Championship 2024
30-minute binary digits	7485 digits	(North Korea) Ryu Song I	WMSC World Championship 2019
Hour cards	2530 cards	(North Korea) Kim Su Rim	WMSC World Championship 2019
Speed cards	12.74 seconds	(Mongolia) Shijir-Erdene Bat-Enkh	IAM Korea Open 2018
15-minute random words	335 words	(India) Prateek Yadav	WMSC World Championship 2019
15-minute names and faces	224 names	(England) Katie Kermode	IAM World Championship 2018
5-minute historic dates	154 dates	(India) Prateek Yadav	WMSC World Championship 2019
15-minute abstract images (WMSC)	1048 points	(China) Huang Jinyao	WMSC China Memory Championships 2022
5-minute random images (IAM)	775 points	(Italy) Enrico Marraffa	IAM French Open Memory Championship 2025

== Championships by country ==
Country	Titles^{[1]}
England	15
Germany	5
Mongolia	5
China	4
USA	3
Italy	2
Sweden	2
North Korea	1
Pakistan	1

== See also ==
- World championship
- Eidetic memory
- Grand Master of Memory
- List of world championships in mind sports
- Memory sport
- Method of loci
- Mnemonist
- Mnemonic major system
- Extreme Memory Tournament
- World Junior Memory Championships
- World Mind Sports Games
- Mind Sports Olympiad
- Mind sport
- Mind Sports Organisation
- International Association of Memory
- Mental Calculation World Cup
- Mental calculation
- Mental abacus
