= Grand Master of Memory =

Title awarded to individuals capable of specific memory feats

Grand Master of Memory (GMM) is a title previously awarded by the World Memory Sports Council to people who are able to successfully negotiate the following three memory feats:

- Memorise 1,400 random digits in an hour
- Memorise the order of 14 decks of cards in an hour
- Memorise the order of one deck of cards in under 40 seconds.

The standards need not all be achieved at the World Memory Championships, nor do they need to be achieved at a single competition, but they must be achieved at competitions that have been officially approved and arbitrated by the World Memory Sports Council.

First awarded in 1995, the titles changed in 2013, with the addition of "international grandmaster" (IGM) and "international master" (IMM) titles, like chess titles. In order of decreasing difficulty, the titles are IGM, GMM, and IMM. All titles are given out at that year's World Memory Championship. As of January 2013, to achieve the IGM title, a competitor must achieve more than 6,000 total points. GMM titles will be awarded to the top 5 placed competitors who are not already GMMs who have achieved a total of 5,000 or more. To achieve the IMM title, a competitor must achieve the three standards originally required for the GMM title: 1000 digits in one hour, 10 decks of cards in one hour, one deck of cards in 2 minutes or less.

As of November 2016, there are 22 international grandmasters, 154 grandmasters, and 149 international masters in the world. Although there are masters from over two dozen countries, the vast majority are Chinese. A full list of masters can be found on the International Association of Memory statistics website.

== See also ==
- Memory sport
- Method of loci
- Mnemonist
- World Memory Championships
