= Mind Sports Organisation =

Association for promoting mind sports

- Type: Mind sports
- Founded: 1997
- Founder: David Levy, Tony Buzan, Raymond Keene, et al.
- Headquarters: London, England
- Key people: Etan Ilfeld (event coordinator), David Levy (chief architect), Tony Corfe (event manager), David Pearce (webmaster)
- Products: Mind Sports Olympiad
- Website: www.msoworld.com

The Mind Sports Organisation (MSO) is an association for promoting mind sports including Contract Bridge, Chess, Go, Mastermind, and Scrabble. Since 1997 it has annually organised in England a multi-sport competition, the Mind Sports Olympiad.

The MSO was founded in conjunction with the first Mind Sports Olympiad. Beside the main event, always in England and usually in London, it has supported similar events elsewhere, including Milan; South Korea, and Prague.

== Mind Sports Olympiad ==
The first Mind Sports Olympiad was held in London's Royal Festival Hall in 1997. It brought together an unprecedented number of strategy games and events. William Hartston in The Independent said, "The biggest gamesfest ever to hit these (or perhaps any other) shores".

The inaugural MSO along with a very large number of games, introduced two new events of their own creation the Pentamind and the Decamentathlon. These were two events to parallel the multi-event games in athletics of the modern pentathlon and the decathlon. This was part of the ambition to create an Olympics of the mind.

The Mind Sports Olympiad returned to London with sponsorship in both 1998 and 1999. Despite a falling out between the organisers (see controversy below) a successful event was held in Alexandra Palace the next year in 2000.

The Mind Sports Olympiad main event continued to happen but without sponsorship the tournaments were held at a number of different universities. The event was still going strong for the years 2001 - 2006. The main 2004 event featured a separate event for schools, featuring competitions and activities in chess, go, quizzes and intelligence puzzles. But in 2007 the Mind Sports Olympiad was reduced to a much smaller venue in Potters Bar due to no sponsorship and no advertising. In 2008 the MSO saw a revival returning to a central London venue, the Royal Horticultural Halls, Westminster and again on 21–31 August 2009. The 2010 event was held at the Soho Theatre in London. In 2011, the Mind Sports Olympiad moved to a bigger venue, the University of London Union. The 16th MSO will take place once again at the University of London Union in 18–27 August 2012.

By 2012 MSO had been flourishing both at its satellite events and at the main event in London, which attracted almost 800 entries in 2011. MSO London is a truly global event, and the 2010 Pentamind World Champion Paco Garcia De La Banda hails from Spain, while the 2011 Pentamind World Champion Andres Kuusk is from Estonia. The most widely read chess magazine in the world, Chess Life, featured an article in February 2012 about in the inauguration of Diving Chess into the 2011 Mind Sports Olympiad.

=== Venues ===
The Mind Sports Olympiad main event has been annual since 1997 at the following locations in England:

- 1997 Royal Festival Hall, London
- 1998 Novotel Hotel, Hammersmith
- 1999 Kensington Olympia, London
- 2000 Alexandra Palace, London
- 2001 South Bank University, London
- 2002 Loughborough University, Loughborough
- 2003 Manchester University, Manchester
- 2004 Manchester University, Manchester
- 2005 Manchester University, Manchester
- 2006 Westminster University, London
- 2007 Potters Bar
- 2008 Royal Horticultural Halls, London
- 2009 Royal Horticultural Halls, London
- 2010 Soho Theatre, London
- 2011 University of London Union, London.
- 2012 University of London Union, London.
- 2013 University of London Union, London
- 2014 JW3, London

== Games at the MSO ==
The MSO consists mainly of single event competitions most of which are for the nominal title of Olympiad champion, though some trademarked games are authorised by the game designer and publishers as the official world championships. All games, whether an Olympiad or the official World championship, can count towards the Pentamind. Medals, and more recently trophies, are awarded for gold, silver and bronze positions in each competition as well as ranks, with similar awards for the top juniors in each event. In early Olympiads sponsorship allowed for generous financial prizes to go with many of the events. In recent years such prizes have been limited to a small number of events, usually as a result of specific outside sponsorship for that discipline.

Notable games include (most other refs mention some of these): The well-known: chess, bridge, draughts, shogi, backgammon, Chinesechess (xiang-qi), Othello, poker, cribbage, Mastermind

And many newer games such as: Abalone, Boku, Continuo, Entropy, Kamisado, Lines of Action (LOA), Pacru, Twixt

At MSO tournaments, the Decamentathlon is a composite event in which players compete in ten separate mind sports. The following mental skills have always been part of the Decamentathlon: memory skills, mental calculation, IQ, chess, Go, othello, 8 by 8 draughts, and creative thinking. MSO also organises Mental Calculation World Championship separately. The remaining two mental skills have changed over the years and come from this list: contract bridge, Backgammon, Mastermind, and most recently Sudoku.

The MSO introduced the Abstract Games World Championship in 2008.

== Pentamind ==
This is one of the Mind Sports Olympiad's original events. It and the decamentathlon parallel the Olympic Games with its events the decamentathlon and pentathlon. Unlike the decamentathlon's fixed format the pentamind has very little fixed format. It disallows using games that are considered too similar and normally requires a long event, but otherwise any five events from the schedule can be used.

The Pentamind champion is the player with the highest numerical score in "pentamind points" from 5 valid events. This is calculated using the formula 100 x (n - p) / (n - 1), where n is the number of players and p is the player's position in an event. The position is the position before tie-breaks and any split positions are shared amongst all of the tied players. When there are fewer than 10 players in a tournament, the score is multiplied by a secondary factor [p / (p + 1)].

=== Pentamind World Champions ===
This event has been won five times by Demis Hassabis.

- 1997: Kenneth J. Wilshire (Wales)
- 1998: Demis Hassabis (England)
- 1999: Demis Hassabis (England)
- 2000: Demis Hassabis (England)
- 2001: Demis Hassabis (England)
- 2002: Dario De Toffoli (Italy)
- 2003: Demis Hassabis (England)
- 2004: Alain Dekker (South Africa)
- 2005: Tim Hebbes (England)
- 2006: Jan Stastna (Czech Republic)
- 2007: David M. Pearce (England)
- 2008: David M. Pearce (England)
- 2009: Martyn Hamer (England)
- 2010: Paco Garcia De La Banda (Spain)
- 2011: Andres Kuusk (Estonia)
- 2012: Dario De Toffoli (Italy)
- 2013: Andres Kuusk (Estonia) and Ankush Khandelwahl (England)
- 2014: Andres Kuusk (Estonia)
- 2015: James Heppell (England)
- 2016: Andres Kuusk (Estonia)
- 2017: James Heppell (England)
- 2018: Ankush Khandelwal (England)
- 2019: Ankush Khandelwal (England)
- 2020: Ankush Khandelwal (England)
- 2021: Maciej Brzeski (Poland)
- 2022: Andres Kuusk (Estonia)
- 2023: Ankush Khandelwal (England)
- 2024: Andres Kuusk (Estonia)
- 2025: Andres Kuusk (Estonia)
- 2026: James Heppell (England)

== Structure of the organisation ==
When the MSO was initially formed in 1997, the board running it included David Levy, Tony Buzan, and Raymond Keene, David Levy being the original founder of the MSO concept. The current (2012) board consists of David Levy, Tony Corfe and Etan Ilfeld. The Mind Sports Olympiad is run by MSO Limited, which is registered in the UK with company number 04712990, and was incorporated in 2003.

== Satellite Mind Sports Olympiads ==
Several satellite events were held around the world bearing the Mind Sports Olympiad name. These have occurred in Cambridge, England; Singapore; Seoul, South Korea; Milan, Italy; Oulu, Finland; and Prague, The Czech Republic.

== Other mind sports events ==
Several other mind sports events and festivals have been held that have their roots in the original organisation.

=== World Mind Sports Games ===
The World Mind Sports Games (WMSG) was created by the International Mind Sports Association (IMSA) as a "stepping stone on the path of introducing a third kind of Olympic Games (after the Summer and the Winter Olympics)". with the aim to be held alongside the Summer Olympic Games every 4 years. The first WMSG was held in Beijing 2008 to coincide with Olympic host city; the 2012 WMSG was held in Lille, France.

== See also ==
- World Mind Sports Games
- List of world championships in mind sports
