= Hare and Tortoise =

Board game

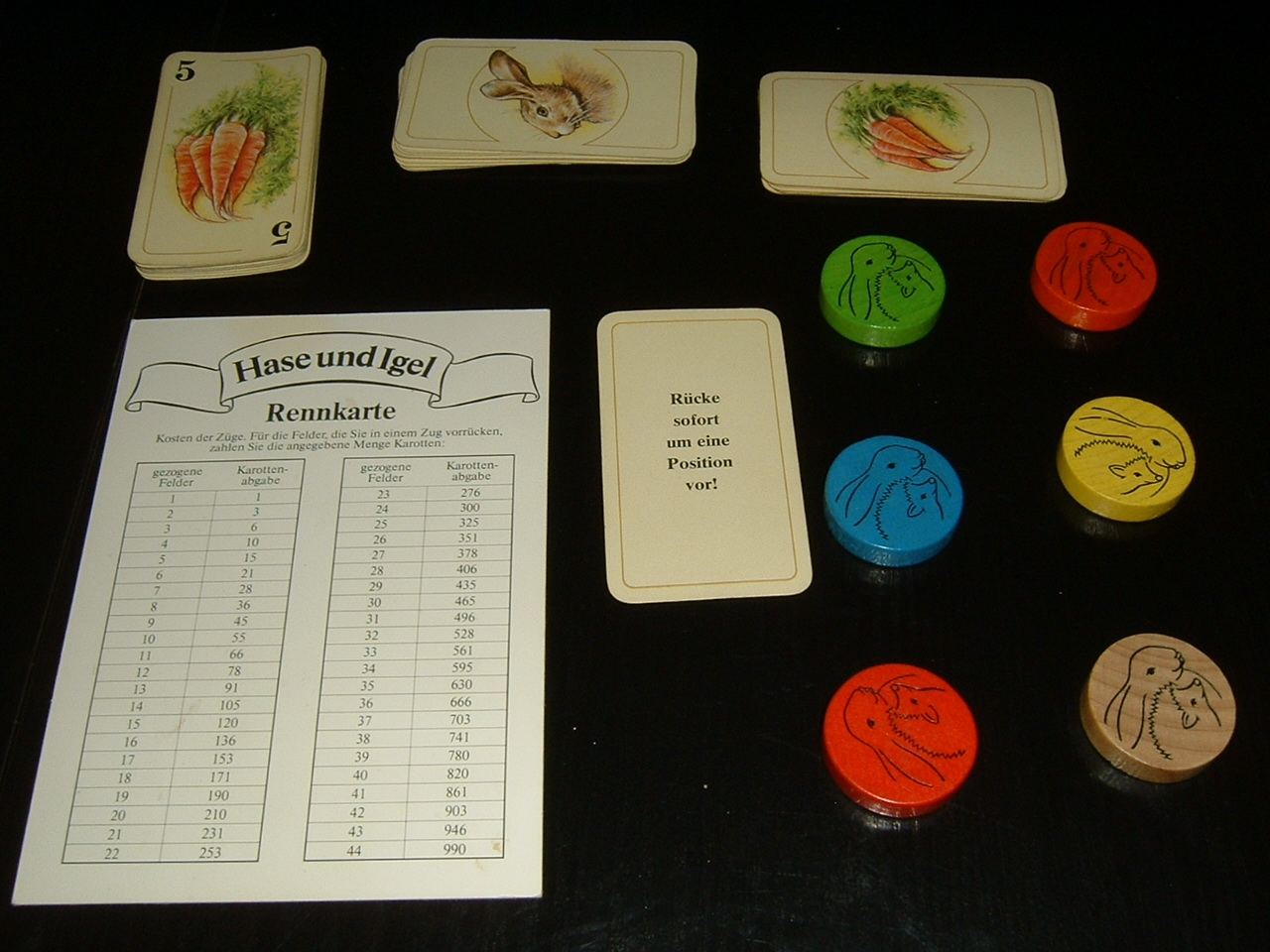
- Designers: David Parlett
- Players: 2–6
- Setup time: 3 minutes
- Playing time: 45–60 minutes
- Chance: Low
- Age range: 8 +
- Skills: Strategy

Hare and Tortoise is a Eurogame designed by David Parlett in 1974 and first published by Intellect Games. In 1978 it was released by Ravensburger in Germany, and received generally positive reviews critically and won the 1979 Spiel des Jahres. It has since sold some 2 million units in at least ten languages. The current editions are published by Gibsons Games in the UK, Ravensburger in Germany and Rio Grande Games in the United States.

== Theme ==
The game is based on Aesop's fable "The Tortoise and the Hare", in which the hare and tortoise decide to race. The tortoise wins the race by cunning while the hare fails because he overestimates himself and takes a nap during the race. The moral of the story is "slow and steady wins the race" which is incorporated in the game mechanic.

== Gameplay ==
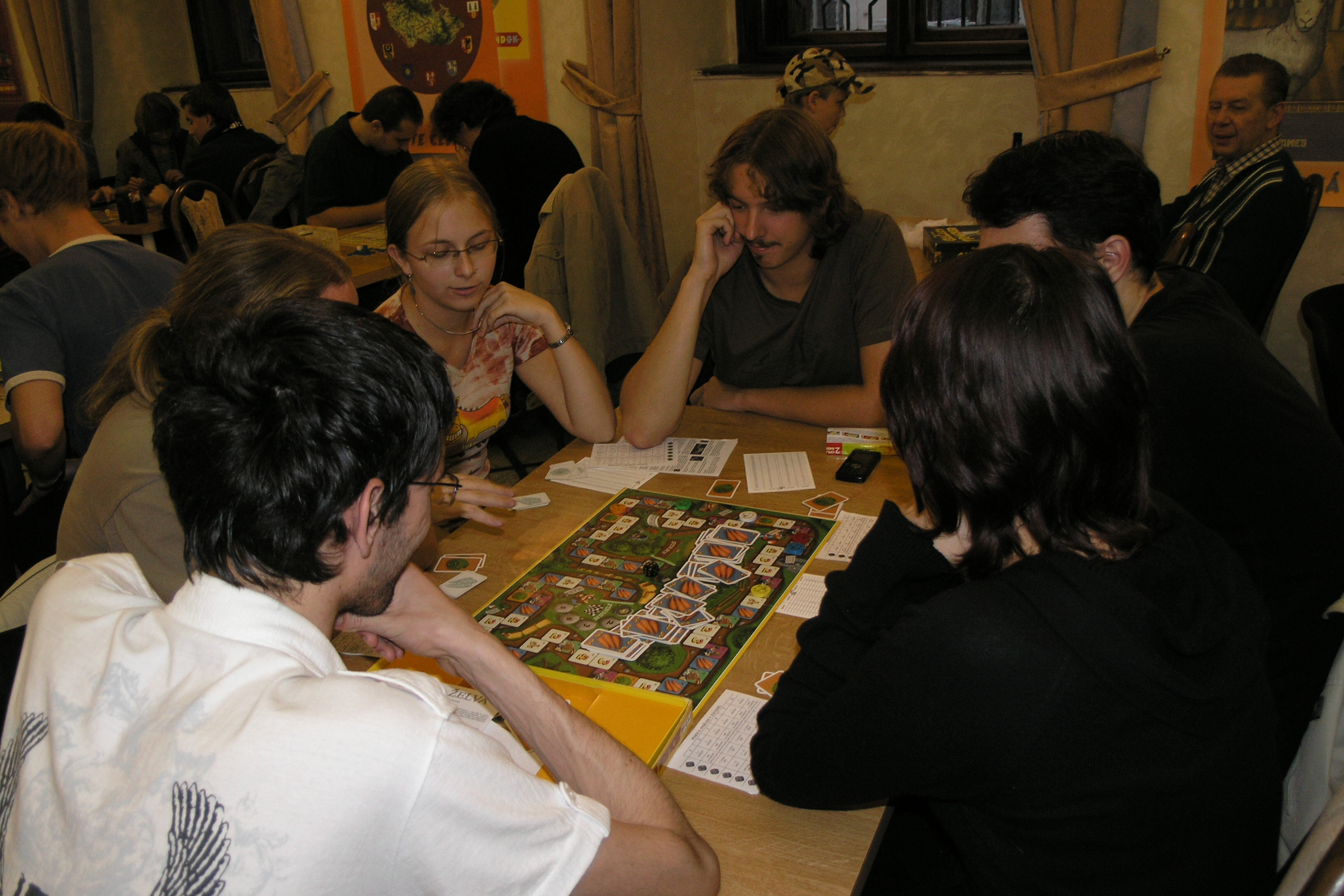
Hare and Tortoise

Hare and Tortoise is a strategic race game in which players pay carrots (the currency in the game) to move forward. The more squares the player wants to advance, the more carrots the player must pay. The cost to advance increases as triangle numbers:

- 1 square = 1 carrot
- 2 squares = price of 1 square + 2 = 3 carrots
- 3 squares = price of 2 squares + 3 = 6 carrots
- 4 squares = price of 3 squares + 4 = 10 carrots
- And so on.

Players can earn carrots in various ways – most notably by moving backwards to designated squares (10 carrots per square). This game mechanic creates an interesting and dynamic race usually with no clear winner until the very end. The players start the game with 65 carrots. The game board features 65 squares. There are no generic squares; instead, the board is divided in several types of squares such as hare (draw a luck card), carrots (get extra carrots for each turn skipped), etc.

One variant of the game is the agreement between the players not to land on "hare" squares, which could eliminate the factor of luck completely from the game.

== Development and release ==
Hare and Tortoise was released in 1974 and was designed by David Parlett. It used a relatively new game mechanic upon its publication, which is utilising resource management for movement. This was only previously found in the unrelated game Bantu published by Parker Brothers in 1955. Until then, race games typically used the roll of dice to determine movement, however, after 1974 non-dice games gradually became more abundant.

In 1978, the game was released by Ravensburger in Germany under the name of Hase und Igel and was re-themed, with the tortoise replaced by the Brothers Grimm hedgehog. Initially selling with difficulty due to being perceived as a children's game, Hare and Tortoise was later presented the first Spiel des Jahres award after a reluctant agreement by the company. The award significantly increased the game's sales, and a total of two million copies have sold in ten languages printed by numerous other publishers, including Gibsons Games in the UK and Rio Grande Games in the United States. In 2016, the game was re-themed again to Around the World in 80 Days, which utilised a money theme instead.

== Reception ==
Hare and Tortoise received positive reviews. The Opinionated Gamers praised its accessibility, complexity, engagement and balance of luck and strategy. However, some reviewers also criticised the lack of theme, the mathematical nature and the dated gameplay. In 1979, the game became the first winner of the now widely recognized Spiel des Jahres award. The Dutch translation won the Toy of the Year (Dutch: Speelgoed van het jaar) award in 1981 when it was released. The game was successful commercially, selling a total of two million copies.

== Reviews ==
- Games #7
- Games & Puzzles
- Jeux & Stratégie #6 (as "Le Lièvre et la Tortue")
- Games & Puzzles #33
- Family Games: The 100 Best

== Champions ==
The official world championships have been held as part of the Mind Sports Olympiad, with David Parlett's endorsement at least until 2013.

- 1997: (England) Chris Dickson
- 2007: (England) David M. Pearce
- 2008: (England) Tige Nnando
- 2009: (England) David M. Pearce
- 2010: (Italy) Dario De Toffoli
- 2011: (England) Tige Nnando
- 2012: (England) Mike Dixon
- 2013: (Estonia) Andres Kuusk
- 2014: (England) Matthew Hathrell
- 2015: (England) James Heppell
- 2016: Dario de Toffoli
- 2017: (Estonia) Andres Kuusk
- 2018: (England) Michael Hornung
- 2019: (Estonia) Kuno Kolk
- 2022: (Estonia) Georg-Romet Topkin
- 2023: (England) Michael Alishaw
- 2024: (Estonia) Andres Kuusk
- 2025: (Estonia) Madli Mirme

== See also ==
- List of world championships in mind sports
