= Diving chess =

Sport combining diving and chess

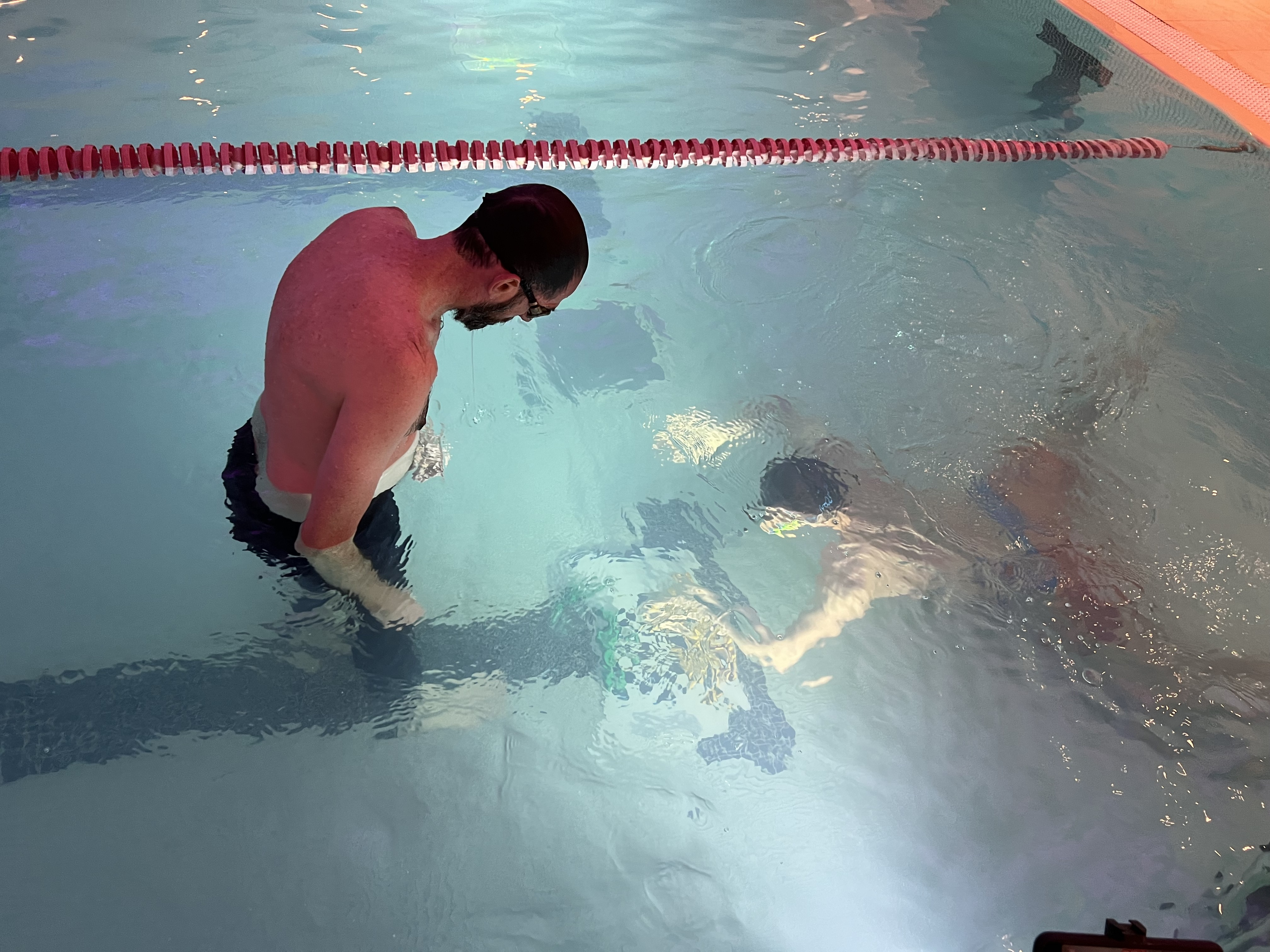
A game of diving chess

Diving chess is a sport in which chess is played underwater. It was invented by Etan Ilfeld; and, since 2013, it has been included as one of the disciplines in the annual Mind Sports Olympiad.

== Rules ==
Diving chess is played at the bottom of a swimming pool, using a chessboard with magnetic chess pieces. The players dive underwater to observe the position and consider and play their move before they resurface to take a breath. When one player resurfaces, it is the turn of the other player to dive.

Such chess games last on average one hour, where the combination of physical and intellectual performance is a challenge: to manage one's oxygen levels while making good chess moves.

Players are not allowed to use any oxygen-supplying device, but they may wear diving masks or swimming goggles. Also, they used to be allowed to use a weight for easier sinking; however, as of 2022, no weights are allowed.

== World Championships ==
Games	Date	Location	First Female	First Male
MSO				
MSO	2016-			Rajko Vujatovic, Etan Ilfeld
MSO	2018-			
?				
DCWC	2022-	London, UK		
DCWC	2024-			
DCWC	2026-05-21	Tarnowo Podgórne, Poland	Anna Andrzejewska, Poland	Paulius Pultinevicius, Lithuania

MSO … Mind Sports Olympiad
DCWC … Diving Chess World Championships
