= Honour & Glory Boxing Academy =

Amateur boxing club in London, England

Honour and Glory Boxing Academy is an amateur boxing club in Kidbrooke in the Royal Borough of Greenwich, London, England, founded in 2020.

== History ==
Honour and Glory Boxing Academy was established in 2020 by head coach Anton Pattenden at the Samuel Montagu Youth Centre in Kidbrooke. Construction firm Durkan Regen provided an initial donation of £5,000 for the club's fight night and a further £10,000 for two new boxing rings, replacing 20-year-old equipment at the youth centre.

The club is based in Kidbrooke, near the Kidbrooke Village regeneration area in south-east London, serving the wider Greenwich, Lewisham, Eltham, Woolwich, and Blackheath areas.

The club has sent amateur boxers to international competitions in Spain (2022, 2023), Sweden (2024), and Mexico for a WBA-sanctioned event (2024). In October 2025, club boxer Charles Whitewood was selected to represent the Amateur Boxing Alliance of England at a WBC Amateur international event in London, organised by the Gloves and Doves initiative, fighting at 67 kg against Daniel Severinov of Israel. The event, held at JW3 in north London, brought together an Israeli team of Jewish and Muslim boxers against British fighters to promote coexistence.

The club's boxers compete at inter-club shows across England, including events hosted by Waltham Cross ABC.

== Notable boxers ==
Notable boxers to have been trained by the club include professionals Giorgio Isaila and Ibrahim Mercan.

Isalia is a super-welterweight who trained at Honour and Glory under Anton Pattenden and former British super-bantamweight champion Matt Marsh. Having only entered a boxing gym for the first time in January 2021, Isaila compiled an amateur record of 17 wins from 20 bouts, winning both the Senior ABA Championships and the National Novices Championships. He also reached the final of an international tournament in Spain. Isaila made his professional debut on 25 November 2023 at York Hall, defeating Jordan Grannum on points over four rounds, winning all four. He is 10-0 as of May 2026.

Ibrahim Mercan is a cruiserweight boxer who trains at Honour and Glory under coach Anton Pattenden. His professional record stands at 6 wins, 0 losses, and 1 draw (6–0–1). He made his professional debut on 18 February 2017 and has fought primarily at York Hall, Bethnal Green. As of March 2026, Mercan is ranked 28th among active British cruiserweights by BoxRec.
