= Gert Schnider =

Gert Schnider (born 1979) is an Austrian professional multi-talented board-game player. In chess he is an International Master, in Go a 5th Dan, in shogi an amateur 5th Dan in Japan and 3rd Dan in Europe, and in Abalone a grandmaster.

He is the MSO world champion of Abalone in 1999 and 2000 and the MSO world champion of Decamentathlon in 2000.

In 2000, he held the First International Austrian Shogi Championship. He was Champion of the 2nd International Shogi Forum in 2002.

He is living in Graz as an officially approved chess teacher "staatlich geprüfter Schachtrainer (A-Trainer)".
