= Cabbie =

Cabbie may refer to:

- A taxicab driver
- The Cabbie, a 2000 Taiwanese film
- Lee Mroszak (1968–2024), also known as Crazy Cabbie, deejay and regular guest on The Howard Stern Show
- Cabbie Richards (active beginning 2001), Canadian TV personality
- London Cabbie or Cabbie, a board game
- A newsboy cap
