= Hiron =

Hiron is a surname. Notable people with the surname include:

- Alan Hiron (died 1999), English bridge player and bridge writer, husband of Maureen Hiron
- Maureen Hiron (1942–2022), English game designer
- Ray Hiron (1943–2020), English footballer
