= London Cabbie =

Board game

- Designers: David Drakes
- Publishers: Intellect Games; Waddingtons
- Publication: 1971; 55 years ago
- Players: 2-6
- Playing time: 120 minutes
- Age range: 12+

The London Cabbie Game or Cabbie is a board game designed by David Drakes and first published by Intellect Games in 1971. Players drive taxicabs through the streets of London, with the winner being the player who accumulates the most tips and fares in a specified time limit.

== Gameplay ==
London Cabbie is played on a board showing a map of the major streets of central London, which shows the one-way and two-way roads and simulates traffic jams. Five face-up passenger cards are laid out, which can be taken and replaced when a passenger is picked up by a player's taxi.

Players start with one taxi token which they can move each turn by spending up to 20 movement points. Later, players can acquire a second taxi, although it shares movement points with the first. Cabs cannot move through other cabs, which can block one-way streets, and the rules of the road (denoted by arrows on the board) must be followed.

Upon picking up a passenger, a player must draw a destination card and drop off the passenger at that location. Depending on the distance of the journey, a fare is paid to the player from a chart listed on the game board. Additionally, the player draws a tip card when the trip is completed. Each taxi can only have one passenger at a time.

The winner is the player with the most money earned in a specified time, with this time limit is decided by the players.

== Reception ==
Barty Philips, reviewing for The Observer, said that London Cabbie has "excellent design [and a] remarkably good quality board." In a review for Games & Puzzles magazine, Eric Solomon described the game as "a really beautiful concept which is not used to full."

The game is on display at the Museum of Brands, Packaging and Advertising.
