= Election (board game) =

1972 board game

Election is a board game published in 1972 by Intellect Games.

== Contents ==
Election is a game in which the board has ten regions and players move around the board to campaign in the regions.

== Reception ==
Alan R. Moon reviewed Election for Games International magazine and stated that "I'd love to see someone take the time to fix this game, because it could be a great one. Right now, it's just a mess of potential."

== Reviews ==
- Games & Puzzles
- Games & Puzzles 45
