= Classic Volkswagens =

1998 non-fiction automobile book

- 1988 Osprey Edition
- Author: Colin Burnham
- Language: English
- Genre: non-fiction, automobile
- Publisher: Osprey Publishing
- Publication date: 1988
- Publication place: United States; United Kingdom
- Media type: Print (hardback and paperback)
- Pages: 128
- ISBN: 0-85045-812-9

Classic Volkswagens is a 1988 bestselling non-fiction automobile book, by photographer and author Colin Burnham. It was printed by Osprey Publishing as part of their classic automotive collection in the 1980s and 1990s, and made sales of over 250,000. It is the second book in a series of nine automotive books by the same author. It is described as one of the "best volkswagen books ever produced" by several automotive clubs. The book has been referenced by over 1,000,000 people.
