= Watkins Books =

Bookshop in London

Coordinates: 51.5107°N 0.1277°W

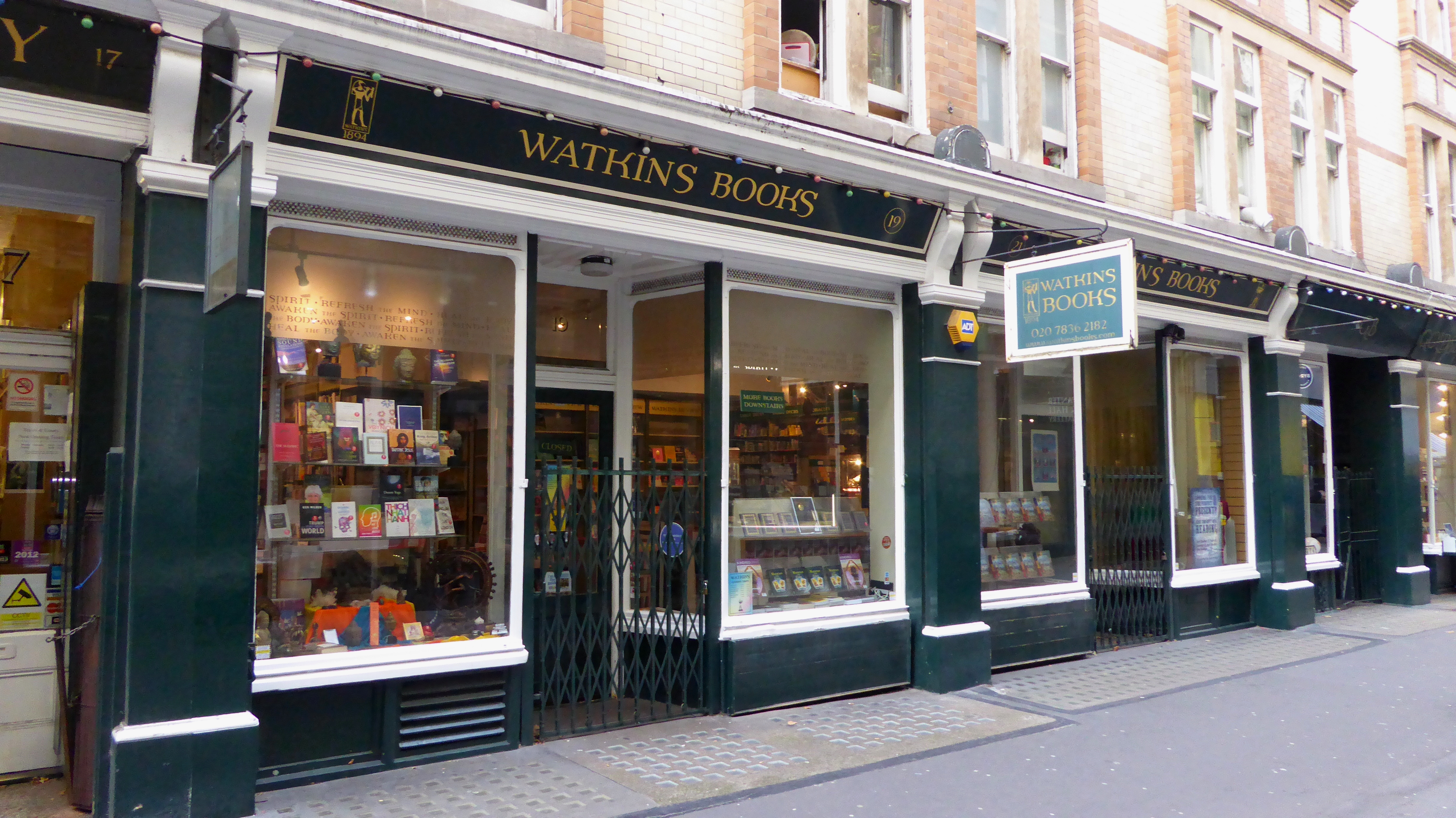
Watkins Books in Cecil Court

Watkins Books is London's oldest esoteric bookshop. It specialises in esotericism, mysticism, occultism, oriental religion and contemporary spirituality. The bookshop was saved by entrepreneur Etan Ilfeld who bought it out of bankruptcy in March 2010. It is affiliated with Watkins Publishing, which publishes books relating to self-development and spirituality.

== History ==
The book store was established by John M. Watkins, a friend of Madame Blavatsky, in 1897 at 26 Charing Cross Road. John Watkins had already been selling books via a catalogue which he began publishing in March 1893. The first biography of Aleister Crowley recounts a story of Crowley making all of the books in Watkins magically disappear.

Geoffrey Watkins (1896–1981) owned and managed the store after his father. He was also an author and publisher

The company first publishing Carl Gustav Jung's 1925 edition of Septem Sermones ad Mortuos.

In 1901, Watkins Books moved to 21 Cecil Court where it has been continuously trading ever since. It publishes a magazine called the Watkins' Mind Body Spirit magazine, which has featured leading authors from mind-body-spirit and esoteric fields. Watkins Books has been owned by Etan Ilfeld since March 2010. Since then, a new website has been launched, and the store regularly hosts book launches and signings.

== Awards ==
Watkins publishes an annual list of "the 100 Most Spiritually Influential Living People," which is usually featured in the spring issue of Watkins' Mind Body Spirit magazine. The main factors used to compile the list are that the person has to be alive and has to have made a unique and spiritual contribution on a global scale.
