= Decamentathlon =

Mental-skill competition

The Decamentathlon is a multi disciplined games event that was created as part of the first Mind Sports Olympiad. It was founded to try to find the best games all-rounder in the world and hence possibly the best games player. It was given a prize fund of £10,000 for the inaugural competition, that equalled that of the highest funded event at the first MSO sponsored by Skandia. However, the other events were spread over multiple playing sessions whereas the Decamentathlon was held over just a single session. This event was initially hailed as the MSO flagship event. Although, the Mind Sports Olympiad's other new event the Pentamind has since become regarded as the more significant event despite not having a fixed format.

== Format ==
The Mind Sports Olympiad was described as the Olympics of the mind. The Decamentathlon and Pentamind were an attempt to replicate the ideas of the decathlon and pentathlon from athletics. Unlike the Pentamind which has a free format allowing competitors to use different events to each other, the Decamentathlon has a fixed format. The Decamentathlon comprises a 4-hour test which is split into 10 events (see below). Each event was either a reduced version of the full event when played in competition or a written paper. Each event carries a maximum score of 100 points so the maximum possible score is 1000 points. The complexity of setting the event and marking it has meant that the only place to have held a Decamentathlon is the Mind Sports Olympiad where the annual world championship is held.

The Decamentathlon was originally divided into ten tests in the following events: bridge, chess, creative thinking, draughts 8x8 / checkers, go, intelligence, mastermind, memory skills, mental calculations, othello.

The memory section was initially run in a fixed format where competitors have to memorise a single deck of cards and a list of 48 random words (previously the second part was memorisation of a 96 digit number). From 2008 the Decamentathlon world championships was held using a backgammon test in the place of bridge.

For 2011 the memory section was switched again, the random words section being replaced by a random 50 digit number to be memorised. The othello and backgammon sections were also removed in favour of a Sudoku test and a Word puzzles test.

== Controversy ==
There has been controversy over the claim that the event had an inherent English language bias. This was especially on the sections of creative thinking and intelligence. This view is reinforced by there only having been one non-native English speaker to have won the World Championships, Gert Schnider from Austria. Although, the fact that three of the winners of the Decamentathlon have won the Pentamind in years other than when they won the Decamentathlon implies that this bias might be small. There have also been issues of marking errors and the official answers not being accurate. This has resulted in medals being changed after they have been presented.

== Champions ==
The World Championships have taken place as part of the MSO since 1997.

- 1997: (England) A Dyson
- 1998: (England) Paul Smith
- 1999: (England) Paul Smith
- 2000: (Austria) Gert Schnider
- 2001: (England) Ben Pridmore
- 2002: (England) David M. Pearce
- 2003: (England) Demis Hassabis
- 2004: (England) Demis Hassabis
- 2005: (England) Martyn Hamer
- 2006: (England) Mathew J. Cordell
- 2007: (England) Mathew J. Cordell
- 2008: (South Africa) Alain Dekker
- 2009: (England) Mathew J. Cordell
- 2010: (England) Mathew J. Cordell
- 2011: (England) Mathew J. Cordell
- 2012: (South Africa) Alain Dekker
- 2013: (England) Martyn Hamer
- 2014: (England) Mathew J. Cordell
- 2015: (England) Chris Bryant
- 2016: (England) Matthew Hathrell
- 2017: (England) Matthew Hathrell

== See also ==
- List of world championships in mind sports
