= Osprey Publishing =

British publisher

- Parent company: Bloomsbury Publishing
- Founded: 1968
- Country of origin: United Kingdom
- Headquarters location: London since 2015
- Publication types: Books
- Nonfiction topics: Military history
- Imprints: Shire, Old House
- Official website: www.ospreypublishing.com

Osprey Publishing is a London-based publishing company specializing in military history. Previously based in Oxford, the company is primarily an illustrated publisher, many of its books include full-colour artwork plates, maps and photographs, and the company produces over a dozen ongoing series, each focusing on a specific aspect of the history of warfare. Osprey publications include the Men-at-Arms series, running to over 500 titles, with each book dedicated to a specific historical army or military unit. Osprey is an imprint of Bloomsbury Publishing.

== History ==
In the 1960s, the Brooke Bond Tea Company began including a series of military aircraft cards with its tea packages. The cards proved popular, and artist Dick Ward proposed publishing illustrated books about military aircraft. The idea was approved, and a small subsidiary company, Osprey, was formed in 1968. The company published its first book, North American P-51D Mustang in USAAF-USAF Service, in 1969. Soon after, Ward proposed trying the same idea with famous military units, and in 1971 the first Men-at-Arms title appeared. In the late 1970s, George Philip Ltd acquired the company. In 1988, Philip was acquired by Reed International; it was sold to the private equity firm Botts & Company.

During these years, the firm grew steadily, adding new titles and new series to their catalogue. Although they have produced books of all types, the main focus remains on military history, particularly the military history of Britain. Osprey Publishing now publishes an average of 10 to 12 books a month, the titles in their military series having by 2024 surpassed the 3,100 mark and still counting.

Shire Books was acquired in 2007, and the science fiction, fantasy and horror imprint Angry Robot was purchased from HarperCollins in 2010. The reprint house Old House was acquired in 2011. London-based Alcuin Capital Partners bought a majority stake in Osprey in 2011. In 2012, Osprey acquired Duncan Baird (later renamed Nourish) and its Watkins imprint. At the end of 2013, the company acquired British Wildlife Publishing.

In 2014, Alcuin sold Osprey and its imprints to Bloomsbury Publishing. Angry Robot, Nourish, and Watkins went to Etan Ilfeld while Osprey, Shire, Old House, and British Wildlife went to Bloomsbury Publishing.

In 2026, Osprey Games, a board and card game division established in 2015, was put up for sale by Bloomsbury Publishing.

== Series ==
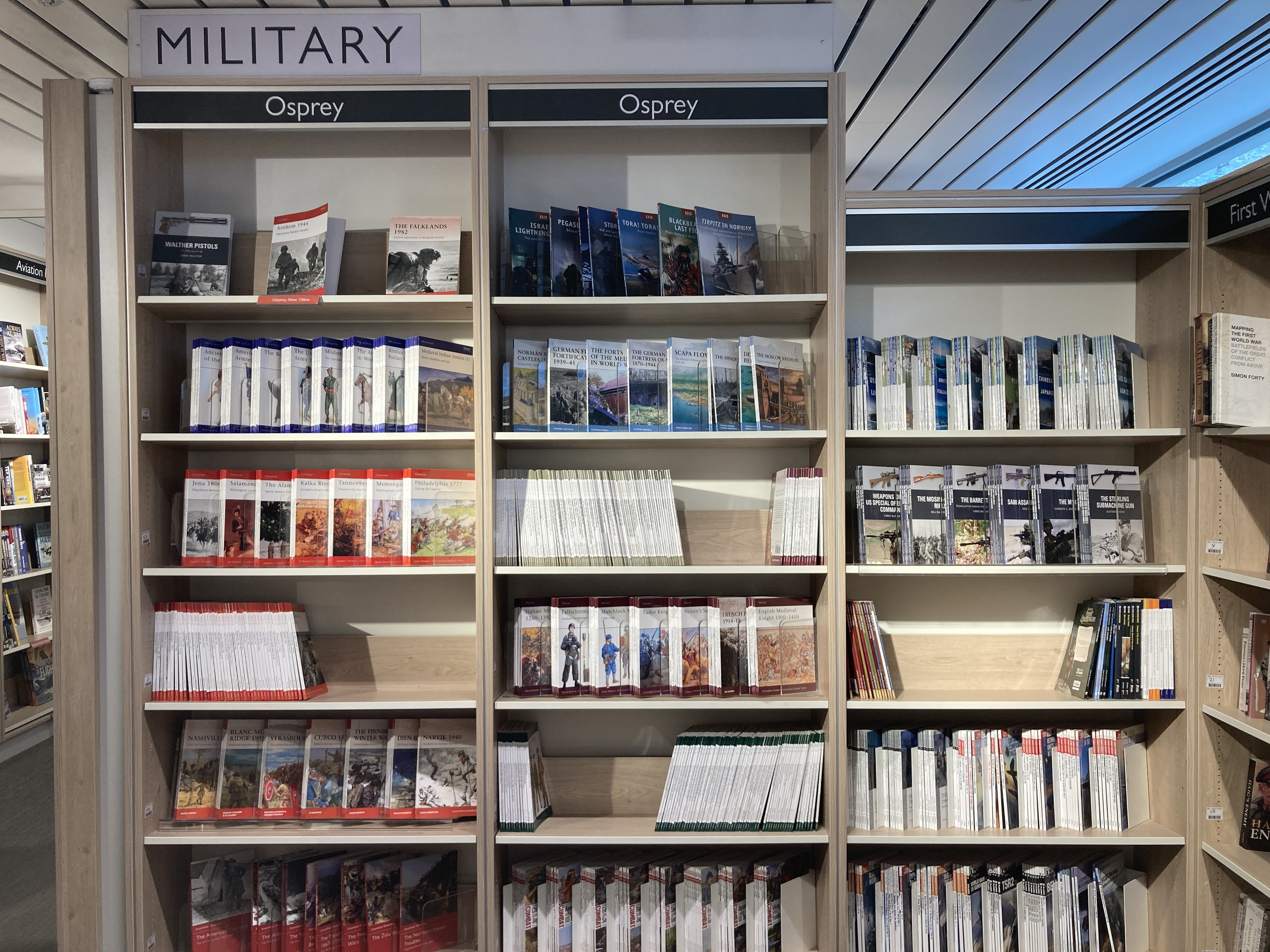
A range of books published by Osprey at a bookshop. Each series has a different coloured spine, and there are some differences between series in how the covers are designed.

- Air Campaign – began in 2018, offers detailed analyses of significant air campaigns, combining strategic insights with visual aids like maps and aircraft profiles.
- Air Vanguard – technical aviation series whose books give a concise history of an aircraft's design and operational history.
- Aircraft of the Aces – A series that focuses on fighter pilots who became aces with first-hand accounts, aircraft profiles, unit listings, and scale plans.
- Anatomy of the Ship
- Aviation Elite Units – Provides a full combat history of a fighter or bomber unit that earned particular distinction in action with first hand accounts, stories of the members of each unit, and specially commissioned aircraft profile drawings and illustrations.
- Battle Orders – details the organization of famous military units.
- Campaign – individual battles or campaigns in military history.
- Combat – Launched in September 2013, this series details the differences between soldiers of opposing armies in the field.
- Combat Aircraft – Concentrates on aircraft in aviation history, the technology behind it, and the men who flew it.
- Command – details the lives of important generals and admirals.
- Dark Osprey – a comedic series detailing paranormal topics such as Nazi zombies and alien invasions.
- Dogfight
- Duel – comparing contemporary opponents, such as French and British frigates in the Age of Sail or German and Soviet tanks on the Eastern Front.
- Elite – details individual units or tactics.
- Essential Histories – Each book studies the origins, politics, fighting, and repercussions of one major war or theatre of war, from both military and civilian perspectives.
- Fleet
- Fortress – details important fortifications from Roman forts to Hitler's bunkers to the Berlin Wall.
- General Aviation
- General Military
- Graphic History
- Guide to… series
- Men-at-Arms – First released in 1972. An illustrated reference on the history, organisation, uniforms, and equipment of the world's military forces, past and present.
- Myths and Legends – Examines the great stories that have echoed down through time to help shape our cultures. Each title focuses on a specific legendary figure retelling the related myth and also provides information about the history behind the story and its evolution over time.
- New Vanguard – books on military equipment such as vehicles, artillery, and ships
- Osprey Wargames – a series of wargaming rules.
- Osprey Modelling – how-to guide to military model making.
- Raid – details about famous military raiding actions or daring plans.
- Under Fire – graphic novel series
- Warrior – focuses on a specific type of warrior of a certain period or culture, examining their experiences on the battlefield as well as training, fighting methods and day-to-day living.
- Weapon – discusses individual weapons from sidearms to artillery.
- X-Planes

== Publications ==
- Classic Volkswagens (1998)
- Field of Glory (2008)

== Reception ==
M Harold Page reviewed Osprey books Steampunk Soldiers, The Wars of Atlantis and Orc Warfare in Black Gate, saying "each book is an excellent worked example of fabricated military history, fun to read in its own right, inspiring for a writer, and potential background material for a Games Master".

Martijn Lak noted that "Osprey Publishing are to be applauded for paying attention" and publishing works about events that are "largely unknown to the Anglo-American audience". Lak also noted that many Osprey books, for example from its Raid series, are "superbly illustrated with pictures, maps, and photos."
