= Mind Sports Olympiad =

International multi-disciplined event

Tournament information
- Sport: Games of mental skill
- Location: London, England
- Established: 1997
- Website: https://MindSportsOlympiad.com/

The Mind Sports Olympiad (MSO) is an annual international multi-disciplined competition and festival for games of mental skill and mind sports by Mind Sports Organisation. The inaugural event was held in 1997 in London with £100,000 prize fund and was described as possibly the biggest games festival ever held.

The MSO was the first event of its kind celebrating mental skills and awarding gold, silver and bronze medals for each event and was highly influential on the mind sports movement and competitions that have followed since. The main MSO tournament has been held every year in England.

In 2020, due to the COVID-19 pandemic, for the first time, the entire MSO tournament was held online.

== History ==
The first Mind Sports Olympiad was held in London's Royal Festival Hall in 1997. It brought together an unprecedented number of strategy games and events. William Hartston in The Independent said, "The biggest gamesfest ever to hit these (or perhaps any other) shores".

The inaugural MSO along with a very large number of games, introduced two new events of their own creation the Pentamind and the Decamentathlon. These were two events to parallel the multi-event games in athletics of the modern pentathlon and the decathlon. This was part of the ambition to create an Olympics of the mind.

The Mind Sports Olympiad returned to London with sponsorship in both 1998 and 1999. Despite a falling out between the organisers a successful event was held in Alexandra Palace the next year in 2000.

During this time several satellite events were held around the world bearing the Mind Sports Olympiad name. These have occurred in Cambridge, England; Singapore; Seoul, South Korea; Milan, Italy; Oulu, Finland; and Prague, The Czech Republic.

The Mind Sports Olympiad main event continued to happen with smaller sponsorship and the tournaments were held at a number of different universities. The event was still going strong for the years 2001–2006. The main 2004 event featured a separate event for schools, featuring competitions and activities in chess, Go, quizzes and intelligence puzzles. But in 2007 the Mind Sports Olympiad was reduced to a much smaller venue in Potters Bar due to no sponsorship and no advertising. In 2008 the MSO saw a revival, returning to a central London venue, the Royal Horticultural Halls, Westminster and again on 21–31 August 2009

The 2010 event was held at the Soho Theatre in London. In 2011, the Mind Sports Olympiad moved to a bigger venue, the University of London Union. The 16th MSO took place once again at the University of London Union in 18–27 August 2012, and similarly the 17th MSO was also at ULU.

The main MSO event remains internationally competitive, because it is regarded as the foremost competition for all-rounders. This is especially the case of the "coveted Pentamind World Championship", won in 2010 by Paco Garcia De La Banda from Spain, while the 2011, 2013, 2014 and 2016 Pentamind World Champion Andres Kuusk is from Estonia.

=== Structure of the organisation ===
When the MSO was initially formed in 1997, the main organisers included David Levy, Tony Buzan, and Raymond Keene with David Levy being the original founder of the MSO concept.

As of 2012 the board running the MSO along with David Levy are Tony Corfe and Etan Ilfeld.

=== Logo, medals, and awards ===
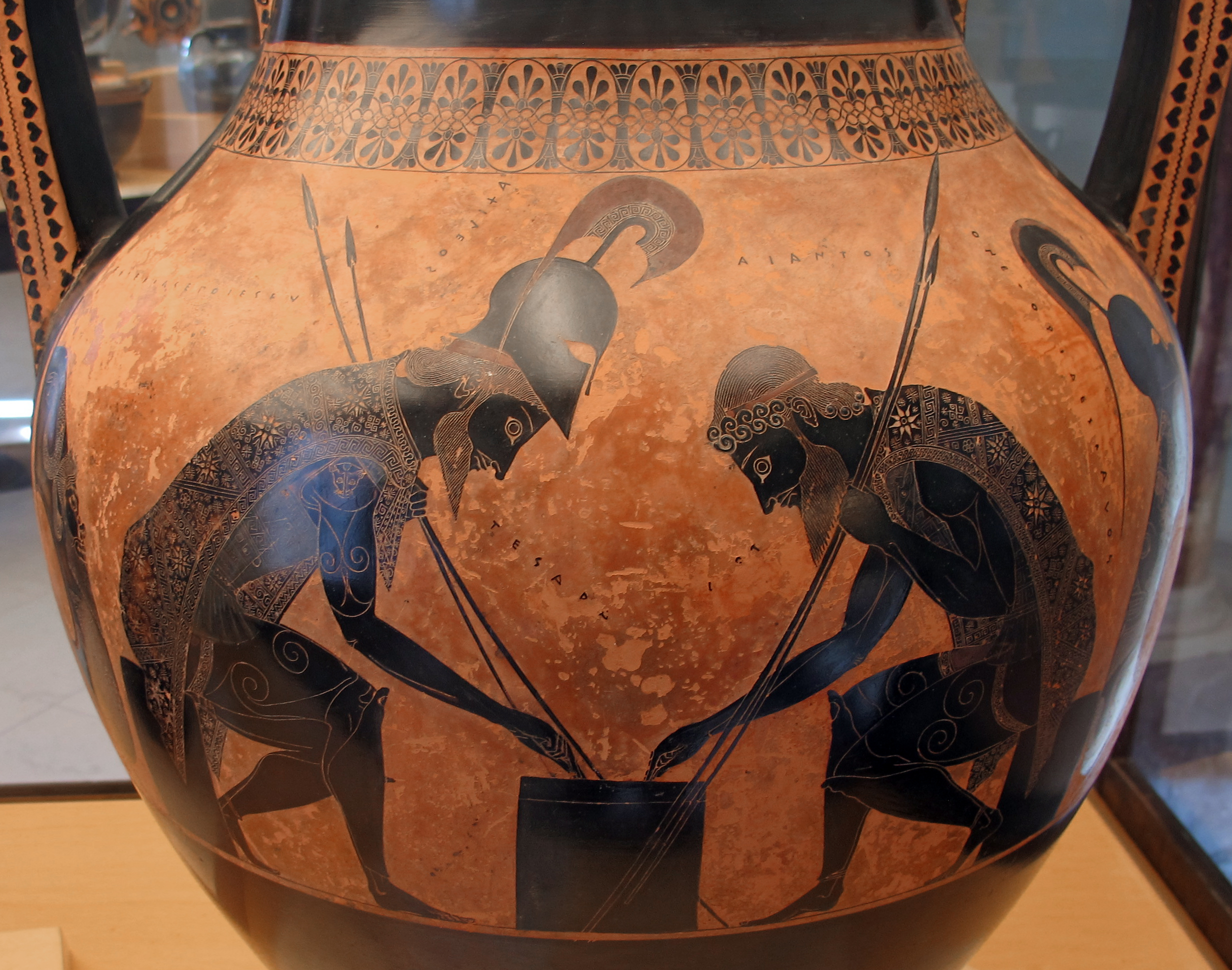
Ancient Greek art that was used as a direct inspiration for the MSO logo, depicting Ajax and Achilles playing a game thought to be Five Lines

The Olympiad's logo depicted Ajax playing Achilles, used for their medals and awards is based upon the famous depiction found on over 150 items of ancient pottery from around 500 BC . Probably based either on an item from The British Museum or Vatican Museum collections.

Alongside bestowing titles of Olympiad and World Champions, the MSO organisers originally envisaged having their own ratings and ranks system, however, not all of these ideas came to pass. The MSO continues to give its own ranks of up to International Grandmaster.

== Editions and venues ==
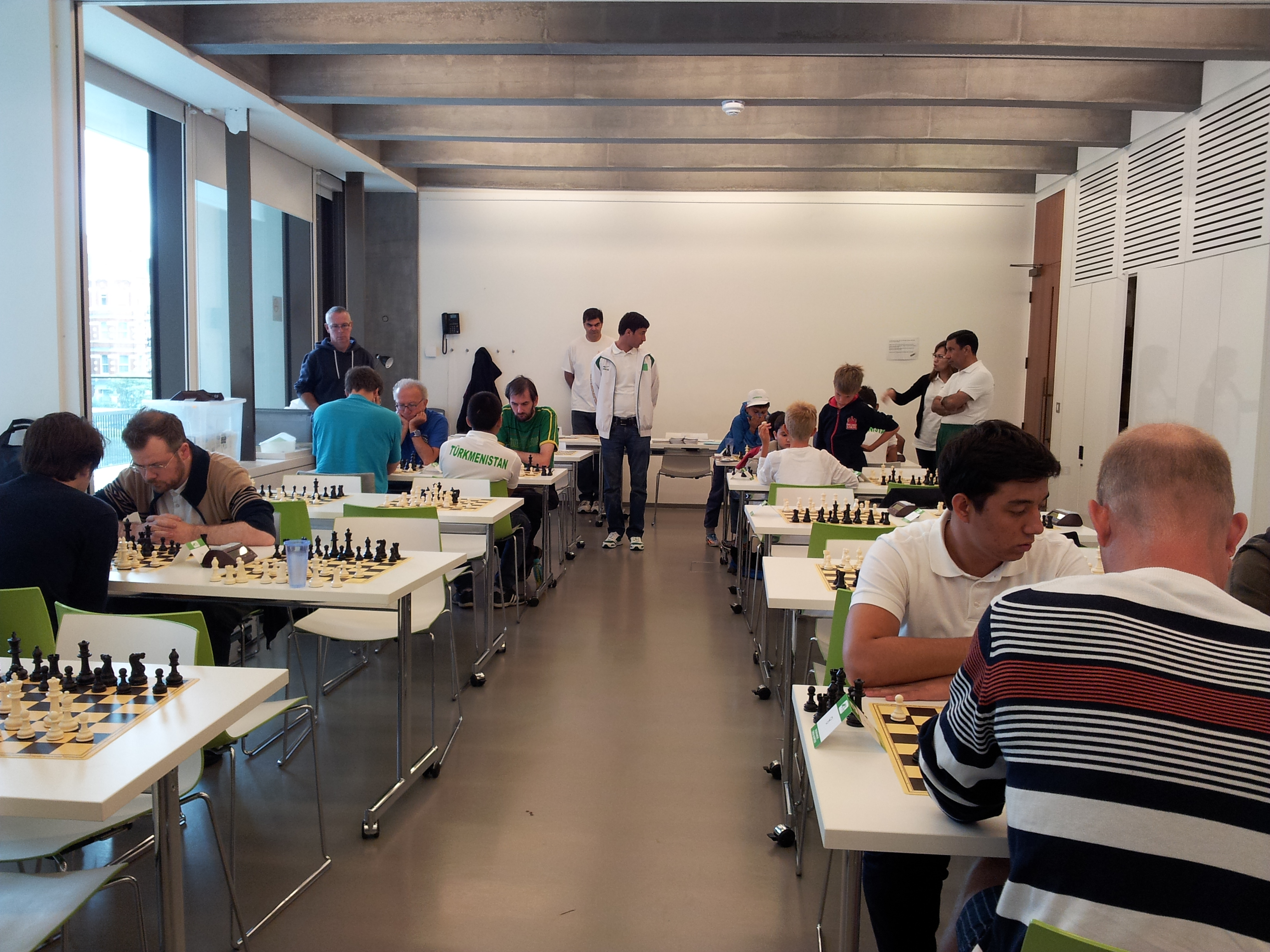
Players at the 2014 Mind Sports Olympiad

The Mind Sports Olympiad main event was at large venues for the first four years before being reduced in size due to funding difficulties. It has been held annually since 1997 at the following locations in England:

No	Year	Venues	City	Refs
1	1997	Royal Festival Hall	London	
2	1998	Novotel Hotel	Hammersmith	
3	1999	Kensington Olympia	London	
4	2000	Alexandra Palace	London	
5	2001	South Bank University	London	
6	2002	Loughborough University	Loughborough	
7	2003	UMIST	Manchester	
8	2004	UMIST	Manchester	
9	2005	Manchester University	Manchester	
10	2006	Westminster University	London	
11	2007	United Reformed Church	Potters Bar	
12	2008	Royal Horticultural Halls	London	
13	2009	Royal Horticultural Halls	London	
14	2010	Soho Theatre	London	
15	2011	University of London Union	London	
16	2012	University of London Union	London	
17	2013	University of London Union	London	
18	2014	JW3	London	
19	2015	JW3	London	
20	2016	JW3	London	
21	2017	JW3	London	
22	2018	JW3	London	
23	2019	JW3	London	
24	2020	Held online		
25	2021	Held online		
26	2022	JW3	London	
27	2023	JW3	London	
28	2024	JW3	London	
29	2025	JW3	London	

== Games at the MSO ==
The MSO consists mainly of single event competitions most of which are for the nominal title of Olympiad champion, though some trademarked games are authorised by the game designer and publishers as the official world championships. All games, whether an Olympiad or the official World championship, can count towards the Pentamind. Medals, and more recently trophies, are awarded for gold, silver and bronze positions in each competition as well as ranks, with similar awards for the top juniors in each event. In early Olympiads sponsorship allowed for generous financial prizes to go with many of the events. In recent years such prizes have been limited to a small number of events, usually as a result of specific outside sponsorship for that discipline.

Notable games include (most other references mention some of these): the well-known: chess, bridge, draughts, shogi, backgammon, Chinese chess (xiangqi), Othello, poker, cribbage, Mastermind; and many newer games like: Abalone, Bōku, Continuo, Entropy, Kamisado, Lines of Action (LOA), Octi, Pacru, TwixT

Current event No longer included

Events included in the MSO from 1997-2015
Event	Discipline	Years
7 Wonders		2014–
Abalone		1997–
Acquire		2000–
Age of Steam		2003–2005
Agricola		2014–
Alfred's Wyke		2009
Azacru		2006–2012
Backgammon		1997–
Backgammon	Blitz	2003–
Blokus		2009–
Bōku		2000–2008; 2010
Borderline		2000–2001
Bridge	Pairs	1997–2005; 2014
Bridge	Teams	1997–2005
Bridge	Swiss Pairs	1997–2005
Bridge	Swiss Teams	1997–2005
Bridge	Minibridge	1998–2000
Bridge	Individual	2013
Carcassonne		2004–2008; 2012–
Chaos and Order		2009
Chess		1997–
Chess	Blitz	1997–2009; 2012–
Chess	Rapid	1997–2006; 2008–2009
Chess	Problem Solving	1997–1999; 2004
Chess	Fischer Time	1999; 2001–2006; 2008
Chess	Fischer Blitz	1999
Chess	Chess960	2010–
Chess	Exchange	2010–
Chess	Diving	2011–
Cities and Knights		2015–
Coal Baron		2015–
Computer Programming		1997; 2013–
Continuo		1997–
Countdown		1999–2000
Creative Thinking		1997–
Cribbage		1998; 2000–2001; 2003–
Cribbage	Pairs	1999; 2001–2009
Cuttle		2009
Decamentathlon		1997–
Dicewords		2008
Diplomacy		1999–
Diplomacy	Escalation	2008
Diplomacy	Intimate	2001; 2004–2007
Dominoes	5s and 3s	2000–2002; 2004–
Dominoes	5s and 3s Pairs	1999–2001; 2003
Dominion		2012–
Dots and Boxes		2009
Draughts	8x8	1997–2011
Draughts	8x8 Blitz	1999
Draughts	8x8 Rapid	1997–1998; 2007
Draughts	10x10	1997–2005; 2011
Draughts	10x10 Blitz	1999
Draughts	10x10 Rapid	1997–1998
Draughts	Czech Dama	2009
Draughts	Dama	2000; 2011
Draughts	Frisian	2007–2010
Draughts	Hexdame	1998–2008
Draughts	Italian	2003–2005
Draughts	Losing	2002–2005; 2010–2012
Entropy		1997–
Gin Rummy		1997
GIPF		1999–2001
GIPF	Problem Solving	1999
Go	19x19	1997–
Go	9x9	1997–2000; 2014
Go	13x13	1997–2001; 2003–2004; 2007–
Go	Rapid	1999; 2001; 2003–2007
Go	Lightning	2000–2001; 2003–2004
Go	Pair	2000–2001; 2003
Gomoku		2012–
Gomoku	Renju	2013–
Hare and Tortoise		1997; 2007–
Hexago		2007
Intelligence		1997–2004
Jigsaw		1997
Kaluki		2014
Kamisado		2011–
Lecardo		2008
Lines of Action		1997–
Lost Cities		2001–
Magic: The Gathering		1997–1998
Mahjong		1997; 2007–2008; 2010
Mastermind		1997–
Memory		1997–2004; 2014–
Mensa Connections		2006–
Mental Calculations		1997–
Mind Mapping		1998–2004
Monopoly		2007–
Nubble		2001–
Othello		1997-
Othello	Blitz	1998–2005
Othello	10x10 Rapid	2000–2005
Oware		1997–2000; 2003–
Pacru		2003–2012
Pentamind		1997–
Poker		1998–
Poker	5 Card Draw	1998–
Poker	5 Card Draw Lowball	1999
Poker	6 Card Lowball	1998
Poker	7 Card Stud	1998–
Poker	Canadian Stud	1999–2013
Poker	London Lowball	2000–2001; 2003–
Poker	Mexican Stud	2003–2009
Poker	Omaha	1998–2000; 2003–
Poker	Pineapple Hold'em	2003–2013; 2015
Poker	Razz	1999
Poker	Texas Hold'em	1998–
Powergrid		2008–2009
Puerto Rico		2003–2005; 2015
Puzzle Design		1998
Puzzle Solving		1998
Quiz		1998–2001; 2003; 2013–
Quoridor		2014–
Retsami		2009–2010
Rummikub		1997–2000; 2003–
Scrabble		1997–
Settlers of Catan		1998–
Shacru		2007–2012; 2015
Shogi		1997–2003; 2012; 2014–
Shogi	Blitz	2000
Shogi	Rapid	1997–1998
Shogi	Chu	2001
Shogi	Tori	2001
Skat		1997–2004; 2006
Snatch		2003–2004
Speed Reading		1997–2001; 2003–2005
Spread Bet		1998
Stratego		1997–2000; 2005–2014
Stratego	Duel	2014
Stratego	Teams	1998–2000; 2005–2007
Stratego	Barrage	2000; 2005–2008; 2013
Sudoku and Kenken		2011–
Superfut		2015–
TAMSK		2000–2001
Terra Mystica		2015–
Tetris		2013–
Ticket to Ride		2015–
Togyzkumalak		2006
Trax		2001
Trigames		2004
Triolet		2005–
Twixt		1997–
vegeTables		2014
Victor Ludorum		2005
Xiangqi		1997–2001; 2003–2004; 2006–
Xiangqi	Teams	2000
Xiangqi	Rapid	2001; 2003–2004; 2006–2007
Zatre		1997–2000
ZERTZ		2001

== Pentamind ==
The Pentamind is a special meta-event, which celebrates the best all-round games player in the world. Winning the Pentamind World Championship is considered by many to be the most prestigious achievement that a player can accomplish at the Mind Sports Olympiad.

This was one of the Mind Sports Olympiad's original events. It was an attempt along with the decamentathlon to produce an event for all-rounders to parallel the Olympic Games with its events the decathlon and pentathlon. Unlike the decamentathlon's fixed format (see separate article) the pentamind has very little fixed format. It disallows using games that are considered too similar and normally requires a long event, but otherwise any five events from the schedule could be used.

The Pentamind champion is the player with the highest numerical score in "pentamind points" from 5 valid events. This is calculated using the formula 100 × (n − p)/(n − 1) , where n is the number of players and p is the player's position in an event. The position is the position before tie-breaks and any split positions are shared amongst all of the tied players. When there are fewer than 10 players in a tournament, the score is multiplied by a secondary factor p/(p + 1).

As of 2025, the World Championship Pentamind event has been won a record seven times by Andres Kuusk, surpassing the five times set by Demis Hassabis and the fifth win Ankush Khandelwal.

- 2025: (Estonia) Andres Kuusk
- 2024: (Estonia) Andres Kuusk
- 2023: (England) Ankush Khandelwal
- 2022: (Estonia) Andres Kuusk
- 2021: (Poland) Maciej Brzeski
- 2020: (England) Ankush Khandelwal
- 2019: (England) Ankush Khandelwal
- 2018: (England) Ankush Khandelwal
- 2017: (England) James Heppell
- 2016: (Estonia) Andres Kuusk
- 2015: (England) James Heppell
- 2014: (Estonia) Andres Kuusk
- 2013: (Estonia) Andres Kuusk and (England) Ankush Khandelwal
- 2012: (Italy) Dario De Toffoli
- 2011: (Estonia) Andres Kuusk
- 2010: (Spain) Paco Garcia de la Banda
- 2009: (England) Martyn Hamer and (England) Tim Hebbes
- 2008: (England) David M. Pearce
- 2007: (England) David M. Pearce
- 2006: (Czech Republic) Jan Šťastna
- 2005: (England) Tim Hebbes
- 2004: (South Africa) Alain Dekker
- 2003: (England) Demis Hassabis
- 2002: (Italy) Dario De Toffoli
- 2001: (England) Demis Hassabis
- 2000: (England) Demis Hassabis
- 1999: (England) Demis Hassabis
- 1998: (England) Demis Hassabis
- 1997: (Wales) Kenneth J. Wilshire

== Decamentathlon World Championships ==
The Decamentathlon World Championship was originally established as the main event to determine the best all-round games player in the world before being superseded by the Pentamind. The Decamentathlon comprises 10 events scored out of 100, lasting 4 hours largely consisting of examined papers.

The following eight mental skills have always been part of the Decamentathlon: memory skills, mental calculation, IQ, chess, Go, Othello, 8 by 8 draughts, and creative thinking. MSO also organizes Mental Calculation World Championship separately. The original two mental skills were bridge and Mastermind, although these have varied in recent years using Backgammon and most recently Sudoku as substitutes.

== Abstract Games World Championships ==
The MSO introduced the Abstract Games world championship in 2008.

== World Amateur Poker Championships ==
The first world amateur poker championships was held in 1998 as part of the second Mind Sports Olympiad. The inaugural event was criticised for the standard of the play and for the events unique feature as only being played for medals and not for money. However, since the internet poker revolution the event continued to flourish with increased numbers. The event also is open to under 18s since the MSO gives a title and money doesn't change hands.

The 2012 tournament consisted of the best results from 5 of 7 pot limit poker tournaments in the following variants:

- 7 Card Stud
- 5 Card Draw
- Canadian Stud
- Pineapple Hold'em
- London Lowball
- Texas Hold'em
- Omaha (poker)

And formerly also featured other variants such as:

- Heads Up Texas Hold'em
- Razz
- 6 Card Lowball
- Mexican Stud

== See also ==
- List of world championships in mind sports
- Mind Sports Organisation
- World Mind Sports Games
