= Pacru =

Abstract board game

Pacru is an abstract board game invented by Mike Wellman. It has much in common with Chess (piece movement with sharp tactical exchanges and long-term positional considerations) and Go (game) (strategic concepts such as area control and the 'life and death' of pieces). Pacru can be played by 2, 3 or 4 people, each controlling a single colour. Commercial versions will usually come with the rules for two other games that can be played with the same equipment, Azacru and Shacru. Pacru, Azacru and Shacru have all been featured at the Mind Sports Olympiad.

== Overview and terminology ==
Pacru is played on a 9x9 grid where each point in the grid is called a "field". The grid is divided into nine borderlands, or "borderland area", each consisting of nine fields. Pieces are called "chevrons" in the official rules. Each player starts with 3 pieces (in the 3- or 4-player version) or 4 pieces (in the 2-player version). During play, each player will attempt to place markers of their colour on the board with the eventual goal of dominating the board. A field with a piece on it, regardless of whether there is a marker on it or not, is called "occupied". A field without a marker or a piece on it is called "empty".

== Rules (Pacru website) ==
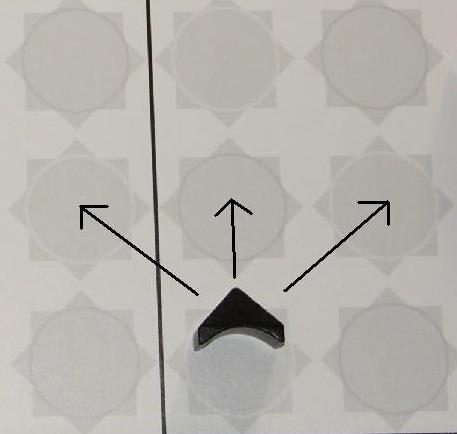
The available movements for this Black piece

=== Basic Movement ===
Pieces in Pacru point in a particular direction. When they move, they may move straight ahead or forty-five degrees to the left or right of the direction the piece is facing. The piece ends the move pointing in the direction of movement. Pieces may only land on a field that is empty, or which has a marker of their own colour. The exception is during piece capture (see Capturing below).

=== Placement of Markers ===
When a piece crosses a border, a marker must be placed on any empty field in the borderland area to which the piece has moved which can be the field on which the piece lands. Markers may not be placed on fields without a marker, but occupied by another piece already in the borderland area. For borderland areas where all fields have markers on them, see 'Filled Borderlands' below.

=== Power of Movement ===
Pieces are always able to move at least one square. If the borderland in which the piece starts its move has N markers of the players' colour, then the piece may move up to N squares. As an example, say the Red player has a piece on e1 (using chess algebraic notation) pointing up the board and the borderland area has four Red markers in it. Their piece may move to any of the following squares:

- d2, c3, b4, a5 (diagonal left forty-five degrees)
- e2, e3, e4, e5 (orthogonal)
- f2, g3, h4, i5 (diagonal right forty-five degrees)

Moves are always in straight lines. It is not allowed to change direction during long moves. Pieces may not jump over other pieces (irrespective of colour) except if the start and end fields already have a marker of their own colour (see Connections below). As in the previous section, if the piece crosses a border with a long-range jump, a marker is placed in the area to which the piece has moved.

=== Connections ===
A jump from a marker of their own colour to another marker of their own colour is called a "connection". When this happens, the player must fill in the fields between the start and end fields with their own colour. This may involve replacing markers of another player (these markers should be returned to the opponent). The exception is if the moves jumps over another piece (friendly or not), when there is no benefit.

If a piece makes both a long-range connection jump and also crosses a border, the player must choose between filling in the fields (for the jump) or getting one marker in the area to which the piece moved (for the border crossing). It is not possible to get both benefits.

=== Filled Borderlands ===
When a piece crosses a border and moves into a new borderland, a marker must be placed on any unoccupied (i.e. empty) field. Later in the game, some borderland areas may be completely filled with markers with no empty fields. When this happens, the player must replace any of the opponents' markers in the area with their own, returning the marker to their opponent. If the area is already completely filled with markers of their own colour, the player receives no benefit. If any field is empty but occupied by a piece, then the area is not completely filled and no marker may be placed on this field.

=== Capturing ===
When a piece is able to move onto the field occupied by one of the opponents' pieces, the piece is said to be "under attack". Attack is mutual if both players' pieces attack each other. In order to capture, however, the player must have two (or more) pieces attacking the same enemy piece. It is not sufficient to capture with only one attacking piece. There must be direct line-of-sight - pieces may not jump over other pieces to attack.

Capturing, as in chess, is by replacement. Move one of the attacking pieces onto the opponents' field, remove the enemy piece and place a marker on the field, replacing an opponents' marker (if any). Note that a marker on the attacked field does not protect the enemy piece. If the attacking piece also crosses a border, a marker is also placed in the area to which the piece has moved.

=== Blocked Pieces and Rotation ===
When a piece has no legal moves it is "blocked". This happens when:

- All available squares are occupied by pieces or by opponents' markers, or
- The piece is facing the edge of the board

Pieces may become unblocked by the actions of other pieces, but can also be unblocked by "rotation". To rotate, the player rotates their piece forty-five (one rotation) or ninety (two rotations) either left or right. When they do this, the player removes 2 markers (45-degree rotation) or 4 markers (ninety degree rotation) as the cost for rotation. Markers may be taken from unoccupied fields only and can be anywhere on the board. Note that rotation is the players' full turn i.e. the player does not get a rotation and move in the same turn.

=== Meetings ===
A "meeting" occurs when a piece moves such that at the end of the move (including placement of any markers) the following conditions are met:

- The field to which the piece moves has a marker of their colour
- The player has another piece exactly one square away (in any direction) and this piece occupies a field which also has a marker of their own colour
- The piece face each other (point-to-point)

When a meeting occurs, the player gets a special meeting bonus which is to place one of their markers anywhere on the board, provided the field is unoccupied. The field may have a marker of their opponents' colour, in which case the replaced marker should be returned to your opponent. Meetings are by movement only. It is not possible to rotate into a meeting. Meetings are hard to achieve, and games are likely to have none. In tournament play (see below), no benefit is gained by a meeting if the opponent has 8 or fewer markers on the board.

=== Winning the Game ===
There are three win conditions in Pacru:

- Capture all of the opponents' pieces
- Place 42 markers (2-player version)
- Except for rotation, the opponent has no legal moves

== World Championships ==
The game has been included at the annual Mind Sports Olympiad or at a World Championship event hosted by the inventor (Mike Wellman). The World Championships have been won multiple times by Pentamind champions Alain Dekker, David M. Pearce and Martyn Hamer.

Time controls for the World Championships have varied, with 20 minutes + 10 seconds-per-move being typical. In tournament play, no additional benefit is gained by a meeting if the opponent has 8 or fewer markers on the board (see Meetings above).

- 2003: (South Africa) Alain Dekker
- 2004: (South Africa) Alain Dekker
- 2005: (South Africa) Alain Dekker
- 2006: (South Africa) Alain Dekker
- 2007: (South Africa) Alain Dekker
- 2008: (South Africa) Alain Dekker
- 2009: (England) Martyn Hamer
- 2010: (South Africa) Alain Dekker
- 2011: (South Africa) Alain Dekker
- 2012: (South Africa) Alain Dekker
- 2013: (South Africa) Alain Dekker
- 2014: (South Africa) Alain Dekker
- 2015: (South Africa) Alain Dekker
- 2016: (England) David M. Pearce
- 2017: (South Africa) Alain Dekker
- 2018: (South Africa) Alain Dekker
- 2019: (South Africa) Alain Dekker
- 2020: No tournament due to Covid
- 2021: (England) David M. Pearce
- 2022: (England) David M. Pearce
- 2023: (South Africa) Alain Dekker
- 2024: (South Africa) Alain Dekker
- 2025: (South Africa) Alain Dekker
