= Dario De Toffoli =

Italian board game designer (born 1953)

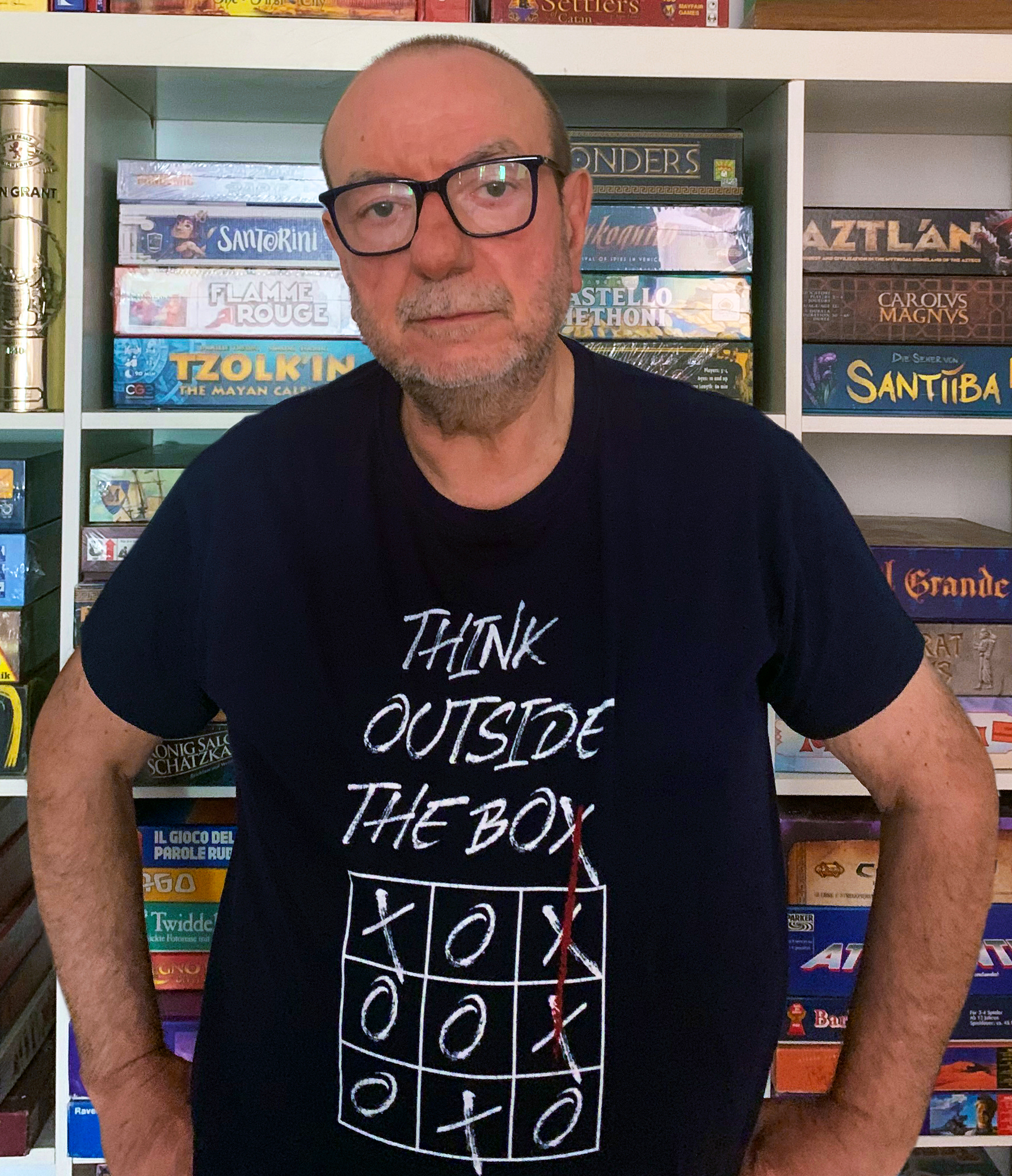
- Born: 1953 (age 72–73); Venice, Italy
- Occupations: Board game designer; gamebook author; games player; tournament organiser
- Known for: Founder of Studiogiochi

Dario De Toffoli (4 August 1953) is an Italian board game designer, gamebook author, and games player who founded the games company Studiogiochi and established many games events. Born in 1953 Venice, after an early career as a chemist he entered the world of games. Winner of over 60 medals at the Mind Sports Olympiad, He won the 2002 and 2012 Pentamind World Championships for the best games all-rounder in the world. In 2006, he won a special award for his contribution to games which includes contribution to all aspects of games.

== Contribution to games ==
The Personalità Ludica dell'Anno (PLDA) award the prize to the games personality of the year. In 2006, instead of the normal competition the PLDA made a lifetime achievement award to Dario De Toffoli for his "career" in games.

In the 1990s De Toffoli and his company staged the first five Italian Festivals of games, the largest in Italy. Other significant events established by De Toffoli include the Mind Sports player competition Giocatore dell'Anno and the Venice International Backgammon Tournament.

De Toffoli also established one of the few board game design competitions: the Premio Archimede (the Archimedes Prize), dedicated to Alex Randolph, an international competition where along with the prize the winner has their game displayed in the Swiss museum of games.

== As a player ==
=== Scrabble in Italian ===
De Toffoli was one of the top players in Scrabble in Italian. The world championship in Italian Scrabble was not founded until 2008 before that there were Majors. De Toffoli had multiple top three finishes in these competitions and won the Masters in 1997.

=== Backgammon ===
De Toffoli wrote two books on backgammon in Italian: the rules of the game and the big book of backgammon In the latter, he is credited with bringing to light that the origins of backgammon went back 500 years further than had previously been reported. He is also a successful backgammon player having won numerous competitions and produced a book on the subject for La Stampa newspaper. He is a top class player having world rating of over 1500 at the end of the 2009 season.

However, De Toffoli's impact on the game is most significant through his involvement in establishing the European backgammon scene. The Venice International Backgammon Tournament established by De Toffoli was one of the first two major backgammon tournaments in Europe along with the Nordic Open Backgammon Tournament. The tournament is one of the most important in the world and forms part of the European Backgammon Tour

=== Poker ===
De Toffoli wrote the first book on Texas Hold'em in Italian and has since then co-written two more of the only books in Italian on poker with Max Pescatori. However, his most important book is certainly The big book of poker, written with the intention of explaining, from the point of view of a game theorist, the winning strategies of poker and its variants. Dario is primarily known for being a leading technician in the game being asked for views on poker and as a TV commentator as he has yet to win a major cash tournament. In 2008, De Toffoli became the Amateur Poker World Champion an event that is not played for money.

=== Italian poker Championships ===
Not only knowledgeable in theory, De Toffoli is also a successful live poker tournament player, having won several times at the Italian Series of Poker Championship, where he currently is the leading player with the most cash tournaments and related titles won as Italian poker champion:

- 21-May-2024, ISOP - Italian poker Championship, € 250 Pot Limit Omaha Hi/Lo
- 25-May-2022, ISOP - Italian poker Championship, € 250 No Limit Hold'em - Freezeout
- 31-Aug-2021, ISOP - Italian poker Championship, € 250 Pot Limit Omaha Hi/Lo
- 22-May-2017, ISOP - Italian poker Championship, € 500 No Limit Hold'em - Pro
- 23-May-2016, ISOP - Italian poker Championship, € 300 No Limit Hold'em - Pro
- 21-May-2016, ISOP - Italian poker Championship, € 120 No Limit Hold'em - Over 50

Results extracted from: "Dario De Toffoli". thehendonmob.com.

=== Games all-rounder ===
As an all-round games player, De Toffoli has won championships in games ranging from Oware to world championships in two new games: Continuo in 2002 and David Parlett's Hare and Tortoise in 2010. He has won over 60 medals at the Mind Sports Olympiad. In 2002 he became the oldest winner of the Pentamind World championship, an event to find the best games all-rounder in the world. This victory was achieved in the middle of Demis Hassabis 5 victories to whom he had earlier managed to finish second against.

== Games journalist ==
De Toffoli has contributed hundreds of articles and puzzles for newspapers and magazines. His contributions include for Giochi Magazine, Il Gazzettino and for La Stampa newspaper.

== Game and puzzle book author ==
As well as strategic books De Toffoli is one of the leading authorities on games having written "the encyclopedia of games" and the "1001 games for everyone". His works also include several puzzle books and a book on draughts.

== Games designer ==
As well as owning the company Studiogiochi, De Toffoli has personally designed and co-designed several board games, the most notable of which are Lex Arcana and Vampiri in salsa rossa role-playing based games. More recent games have had a more mainstream focus such as Sudoku and Kakuro board games and themed board games such as for the Totally Spies! cartoon series.

Games designed by De Toffoli include:

- Kluges Kopfchen
- Totally Spies
- Poker Cinese
- Trova le mine
- Joker Poker
- Happy birthday!
- Nebraska
- Babar et le mystère des lettres perdues
- Kakuro challenge
- Kakuro (board game)
- Challenge Sudoku
- Mango Tango
- Sudoku (board game)
- Challenge Sudoku – Kakuro Challenge
- Number one
- Ketch up
- Yummy
- Buon compleanno
- Adventure cards
- Dummy
- Theseus
- I giochi della frutta
- Abaco zuzzurellone
- Lex Arcana
- Jagd der Vampire
- Detective

== Bibliography ==
Books written by De Toffoli include:

- Dario De Toffoli, Allena-mente 2.0, Gribaudo, 2023, ISBN 978-88-580-5496-3
- Dario De Toffoli & Dario Zaccariotto, Un’estate geniale, Il Sole 24 ORE, 2023, ISBN 979-12-548-4158-7
- Dario De Toffoli, Il grande libro del calcolo veloce e mentale, Mondadori, 2022, ISBN 978-88-918-3467-6
- Dario De Toffoli, 100 Poker, Sperling & Kupfer, 2018, ISBN 978-88-200-6479-2
- Dario De Toffoli, The Big Book of Poker, Watkins - London (UK), 2018, ISBN 978-1-84899-251-1
- Dario De Toffoli, Dario Zaccariotto & Silvia De Toffoli, Numeri, Edizioni Koala, 2017, ISBN 978-88-200-5339-0
- Dario De Toffoli, Allena la tua mente, Cairo Ed., 2013, ISBN 978-88-6052-497-3
- Dario De Toffoli, Giochiamo a Burraco (e-book), Sperling & Kupfer, 2013, ISBN 978-88-733-9811-0
- Dario De Toffoli & Margherita Bonaldi, Blackjack: A Champion’s Guide, Gaming Books - Alresford (UK), 2013, ISBN 978-1-78099-609-7
- Dario De Toffoli & Margherita Bonaldi, Superpoker, Sperling & Kupfer, 2012, ISBN 978-88-200-5339-0
- Dario De Toffoli & Margherita Bonaldi, Il grande libro del Blackjack e dei giochi da casinò, Sperling & Kupfer, 2011, ISBN 978-88-200-5030-6
- Dario De Toffoli, Max Pescatori & Giorgio Sigon, A scuola di Poker, Sperling & Kupfer, 2010, ISBN 978-88-200-4890-7
- Giampaolo Dossena & Dario De Toffoli, Enciclopedia dei giochi, Mondadori, Milan, 2009, ISBN 978-88-200-4760-3
- Max Pescatori & Dario De Toffoli, Giocare e vincere a poker online, Sperling &Kupfer, Milan, 2009, ISBN 88-200-4760-8
- Dario De Toffoli & Leo Colovini, Il grande libro degli scacchi, ISBN 978-88-200-4794-8
- Dario De Toffoli, Il grande libro del Backgammon, Stampa Alternativa, 2008, ISBN 978-88-6222-035-4
- Dario De Toffoli & Dario Zaccariotto, 1001 Giochi per tutti, Mondolibri, Milan, 2008, ISBN 978-88-200-4712-2
- Dario De Toffoli, Dario Zaccariotto & Leo Colovini, Brainquiz, Sperling & Kupfer, Milan 2008, ISBN 978-88-200-4550-0
- Dario De Toffoli, Dario Zaccariotto & Margot De Rosa, Numeri, Stampa Alternativa, Viterbo, ISBN 978-88-6222-052-1
- Dario De Toffoli, Il grande gioco del Poker, Mondadori, Verona, 2008
- Dario De Toffoli, Il grande libro del Poker, Sperling and Kupfer, Milan, 2007ISBN 978-88-2004-389-6
- Dario De Toffoli & Dario Zaccariotto, Cibo per la mente – Vol III, Stampa Alternativa, Viterbo, 2007, ISBN 88-7226-960-1
- Dario De Toffoli & Dario Zaccariotto, KAFKA, Sperling and Kupfer, Milan, 2007
- Dario De Toffoli & Dario Zaccariotto, Sfida al quadrato, Sperling and Kupfer, Milan, 2006, ISBN 978-88-7339-120-3
- Dario De Toffoli & Dario Zaccariotto, Cibo per la mente II, Stampa Alternativa, Viterbo, 2005, ISBN 978-88-7226-893-3
- Dario De Toffoli, Il giocatore consapevole, Stampa Alternativa, Viterbo, 2004, ISBN 88-7226-824-9
- Dario De Toffoli & Dario Zaccariotto, Cibo per la mente I, Stampa Alternativa, 2004, ISBN 88-7226-816-8
- Dario De Toffoli, Guida al poker, Conde Nast, Milan, 2004
- Dario De Toffoli, Giochi, Unicopli, Viterbo, 2003, ISBN 88-400-0914-0
- Dario De Toffoli, Backgammon, Tutte le regole del gioco, Nuovi Equilibri, Stampa Alternativa, Viterbo, 2002, ISBN 88-7226-704-8
- Dario De Toffoli, Giocare e vincere a Poker, Stampa Alternativa, 2002, ISBN 978-88-7226-716-5
- Dario De Toffoli, Dario Zaccariotto, Michele Comerci & Claudio Borgnino, Giocare con le parole, La Scuola, Brescia, 2000
- Dario De Toffoli & Dario Zaccariotto, Dama, Unicopli, Viterbo, 2000 ISBN 978-88-87766-08-0
- Dario De Toffoli, Nel mondo dei cruciverba, Unicopli, Viterbo, 2000, ISBN 978-88-87766-05-9
- Dario De Toffoli, Scala quaranta, pinnacolo e dintorni, Unicopli, Viterbo, 2000, ISBN 88-7307-317-4
- Dario De Toffoli, Backgammon, La Stampa, 1999
- Dario De Toffoli, Giocare a Backgammon, Arsenale, Venice, 1991 ISBN 978-88-6222-035-4
- Dario De Toffoli, Giocare a Scarabeo, Sansoni Editore, Florence, 1985
