= Entropy (board game) =

Abstract strategy board game

Entropy is an abstract strategy board game for two players designed by Eric Solomon in 1977. The game is "based on the eternal conflict in the universe between order and chaos [...] One player is Order, the other Chaos. Order is trying to make patterns vertically and horizontally. Chaos is trying to prevent this." The game originally employed a 5×5 gameboard, but in 2000 a 7x7 board was introduced to allow deeper strategies.

== History and reception ==
Entropy was awarded a rare 6 out of 6 by Games & Puzzles Magazine in 1981. David Pritchard called the game "a modern classic". It also has been sold commercially under the names Vis-A-Vis (US, using a 5×5 board), Hyle (Germany, also a 5×5 board) and Hyle7 (Germany, a 7×7 board).

== Rules ==
The gameboard is a square grid of 7×7 cells. A game consists of two rounds. Each round starts with the board empty, and a bag containing 49 chips in seven colours.

Scoring examples
Pattern	Score	Notes
R R	2	Two identical; 2 points (RR) based on length
R B R	3	Basic pattern; 3 points (RBR) for length
R R R	7	Three identical with overlapping patterns; 3 points (RRR) + 2 points (RRx) + 2 points (xRR), considering first and last two chips separately
R B B R	6	Double center with nested patterns; 4 points (RBBR) + 2 points (xBBx)
R R R R	16	Four identical with nested and overlapping patterns; 4 points (RRRR) + 3 points (RRRx) + 3 points (xRRR) + 2 (xxRR) + 2 (xRRx) + 2 (RRxx)
R B G B R	8	Nested pattern; 5 points (RBGBR) + 3 points (xBGBx)
R R B R R	12	Double ends with nested & overlapping patterns; 5 points (RRBRR) + 3 points (xRBRx) + 4 (RRxxx, xxxRR)
R B B B R	12	Triple center with nested & overlapping patterns; 5 points (RBBBR) + 3 points (xBBBx) + 4 (xBBxx, xxBBx)
R B R B R	14	Five alternating with nested & overlapping patterns; 5 points (RBRBR) + 9 points (RBRxx, xBRBx, xxRBR)
R R R R R	30	Five identical with nested & overlapping patterns; 5 points (RRRRR) + 8 (RRRRx, xRRRR) + 9 (RRRxx, xRRRx, xxRRR) + 8 (RRxxx, xRRxx, xxRRx, xxxRR)
R B G G B R	12	Double center with nested patterns; 6 points (RBGGBR) + 4 points (xBGGBx) + 2 (xxGGxx)
R R B B R R	16	Triple pairs with nested patterns; 6 points (RRBBRR) + 4 points (xRBBRx) + 6 (RRxxxx, xxBBxx, xxxxRR)
R B R R B R	18	Repeating trios with nested & overlapping patterns; 6 points (RBRRBR) + 6 points (RBRxxx, xxxRBR) + 4 (xBRRBx) + 2 (xxRRxx)
R B B B B R	22	Quadruple center with nested & overlapping patterns; 6 points (RBBBBR) + 4 points (xBBBBx) + 6 (xBBBxx, xxBBBx) + 6 (xBBxxx, xxBBxx, xxxBBx)
R R R R R R	50	Six identical with nested & overlapping patterns; 6 points (RRRRRR) + 10 (RRRRRx, xRRRRR) + 12 (RRRRxx, xRRRRx, xxRRRR) + 12 (RRRxxx, xRRRxx, xxRRRx, xxxRRR) + 10 (RRxxxx, xRRxxx, xxRRxx, xxxRRx, xxxxRR)
R B G R G B R	15	Three colors with nested patterns; 7 points (RBGRGBR) + 5 points (xBGRGBx) + 3 points (xxGRGxx)
R B G Y G B R	15	Four colors with nested patterns; 7 points (RBGYGBR) + 5 points (xBGYGBx) + 3 points (xxGYGxx)
R B B G B B R	19	Pairs near ends with nested & overlapping patterns; 7 points (RBBGBBR) + 5 (xBBGBBx) + 3 (xxBGBxx) + 4 (xBBxxxx, xxxxBBx)
R R B G B R R	19	Paired ends with nested pattern; 7 points (RRBGBRR) + 5 (xRBGBRx) + 3 (xxBGBxx) + 4 (RRxxxxx, xxxxxRR)
R B G G G B R	19	Triple center with nested & overlapping patterns; 7 points (RBGGGBR) + 5 (xBGGGBx) + 3 (xxGGGxx) + 4 (xxGGxxx, xxxGGxx)
R B R G R B R	21	Repeating trios with nested & overlapping patterns; 7 points (RBRGRBR) + 5 (xBRGRBx) + 9 (xxRGRxx, RBRxxxx, xxxxRBR)
R B G B G B R	21	Three colors with nested & overlapping patterns; 7 points (RBGBGBR) + 5 (xBGBGBx) + 9 (xBGBxxx, xxGBGxx, xxxBGBx)
R R B B B R R	23	Paired ends and triple center with nested & overlapping patterns; 7 points (RRBBBRR) + 5 (xRBBBRx) + 3 (xxBBBxx) + 8 (RRxxxxx, xxBBxxx, xxxBBxx, xxxxxRR)
R R B R B R R	25	Paired ends with nested & overlapping patterns; 7 points (RRBRBRR) + 5 (xRBRBRx) + 9 (xRBRxxx, xxBRBxx, xxxRBRx) + 4 (RRxxxxx, xxxxxRR)
R B R R R B R	25	Triple center with nested & overlapping patterns; 7 points (RBRRRBR) + 5 (xBRRRBx) + 9 (RBRxxxx, xxRRRxx, xxxxRBR) + 4 (xxRRxxx, xxxRRxx)
R B B R B B R	27	Pairs next to ends with nested & overlapping patterns; 7 points (RBBRBBR) + 5 (xBBRBBx) + 8 (RBBRxxx, xxxRBBR) + 3 (xxBRBxx) + 4 (xBBxxxx, xxxxBBx)
R B R B R B R	27	Seven alternating with nested & overlapping patterns; 7 points (RBRBRBR) + 5 (xBRBRBx) + 15 (RBRxxxx, xBRBxxx, xxRBRxx, xxxBRBx, xxxxRBR)
R R R B R R R	29	Triple ends with nested & overlapping patterns; 7 points (RRRBRRR) + 5 (xRRBRRx) + 9 (RRRxxxx, xxRBRxx, xxxxRRR) + 8 (RRxxxxx, xRRxxxx, xxxxRRx, xxxxxRR)
R B B B B B R	37	Quintuple center with nested & overlapping patterns; 7 points (RBBBBBR) + 5 (xBBBBBx) + 8 (xBBBBxx, xxBBBBx) + 9 (xBBBxxx, xxBBBxx, xxxBBBx) + 8 (xBBxxxx, xxBBxxx, xxxBBxx, xxxxBBx)
R R R R R R R	77	Seven identical with nested & overlapping patterns; 7 points (RRRRRRR) + 12 (RRRRRRx, xRRRRRR) + 15 (RRRRRxx, xRRRRRx, RRRRRxx) + 16 (RRRRxxx, xRRRRxx, xxRRRRx, xxxRRRR) + 15 (RRRxxxx, xRRRxxx, xxRRRxx, xxxRRRx, xxxxRRR) + 12 (RRxxxxx, xRRxxxx, xxRRxxx, xxxRRxx, xxxxRRx, xxxxxRR)

During each turn, the first player (Chaos) draws one coloured chip at random from the bag and places it on the board in an empty cell. After each chip is placed by Chaos, the turn is completed by the second player (Order), who may slide one chip to an empty cell or choose to pass their turn. The chip can be slid horizontally or vertically any distance in a straight line through empty cells, but cannot jump over any occupied cells. The two players continue taking turns drawing, placing, and sliding until the last chip is placed and the board is full, which finishes the round.

Order scores 1 point for each chip in any palindromic pattern of chip colours (e.g. red–green–blue–green–red scores 3 + 5 = 8 points; red–red–red scores 2 + 2 + 3 = 7 points) occurring either horizontally or vertically. Overlapping and nested patterns are scored separately and contribute to the final score. There are thirty potential patterns within a seven-cell row or column.

After the score is tallied, the players switch roles and play a second round. The player with the higher score as Order wins the game and draws are possible.

=== Example ===
Example 1
	8	2	2	6	6	0	0	
7	B	K	P	Y	P	Y	P	14
6	B	G	G	G	B			12
5	P	P				B		2
4	M	Y	Y	M	Y	R		9
3	M	R	G	B	G		M	3
2	P	R	G	M	Y			0
1	R	K	P	B	G	R	M	0
	a	b	c	d	e	f	g	

In Example 1, scores are shown for the game in progress in red along the top row and right column, while the bold numbers and letters in the left column and bottom row refer to coordinates on the board. In column a, the score of 8 results from the combination of the double blue (B) in a6-a7 and the sequence purple-maroon-maroon purple (PMMP) in a2-a5, scoring 2 and 6 points, respectively.

With 39 chips already on the board, Chaos has 10 chips remaining in the bag. Since there are seven chips of each color, Order knows that odds favor drawing a black (K) chip next, with five remaining in the bag, followed by red (R, two chips left), and one each of yellow (Y), blue (B), and maroon (M); all seven of the green (G) and purple (P) chips have already been drawn and placed.

There are three connected regions or "holes" on the board for Chaos to play the next piece; Order may choose to slide (for example, Bf5c5) to consolidate two holes, giving Order more choices for moving the pieces.

== Championships ==
The game has been included as one of the events at the annual Mind Sports Olympiad since its inception. Demis Hassabis had won this event a record five times until losing in 2007. Demis' record was broken in 2021 by David Jameson (Wales) who won his sixth title, extending the record in 2023. The event has also been won by Hassabis's brother George and by other Pentamind champions, David M. Pearce, Alain Dekker, Paco Garcia de la Banda and Andres Kuusk.

- 1997: (England) Murray Heasman
- 1998: (England) Peter Horlock
- 1999: (England) George Hassabis
- 2000: (England) Demis Hassabis
- 2001: (England) Demis Hassabis
- 2002: (England) David M. Pearce
- 2003: (England) Demis Hassabis
- 2004: (England) Demis Hassabis
- 2005: (England) Peter Horlock
- 2006: (England) Demis Hassabis
- 2007: (England) David M. Pearce
- 2008: (England) Peter Horlock
- 2009: (South Africa) Alain Dekker
- 2010: (Spain) Paco Garcia de la Banda
- 2011: (England) Peter Horlock
- 2012: (Estonia) Andres Kuusk
- 2013: (Estonia) Andres Kuusk
- 2014: (Wales) David Jameson
- 2015: (Estonia) Andres Kuusk
- 2016: (Wales) David Jameson
- 2017: (Wales) David Jameson
- 2018: (Wales) David Jameson
- 2019: (Wales) David Jameson
- 2020: (Wales) David Jameson
- 2021: (Estonia) Paul Kolk
- 2022: (South Africa) Alain Dekker
- 2023: (Wales) David Jameson
- 2024: (South Africa) Alain Dekker
- 2025: (Estonia) Andres Kuusk
- 2026: (England) James Heppell
