= Etan Ilfeld =

American entrepreneur

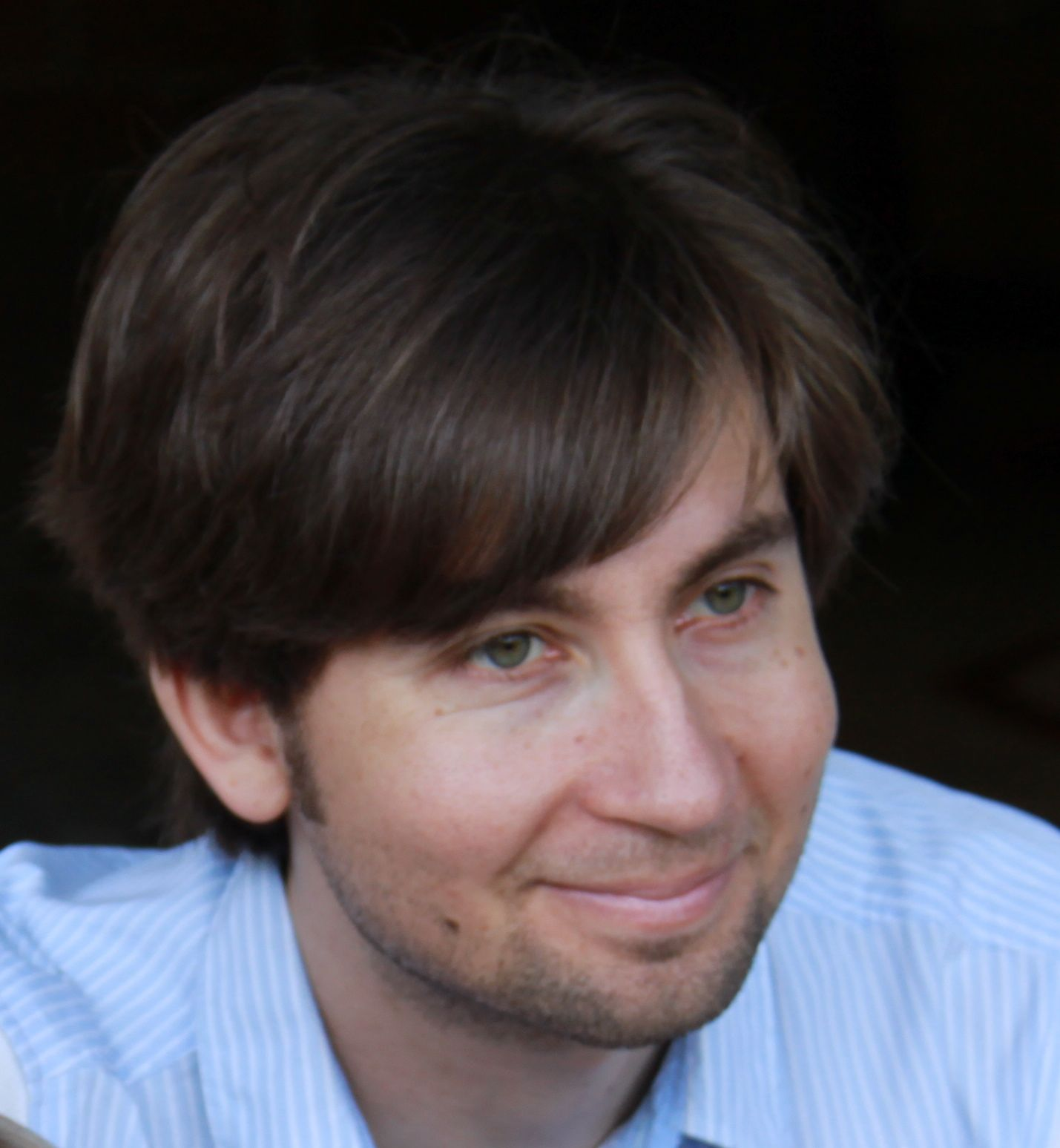
- Ilfeld in 2009
- Born: Los Angeles, California, U.S.
- Education: Stanford University (BS); University of Southern California (MA)

Etan Ilfeld is a London-based entrepreneur and the founder of Tenderbooks, Tenderpixel gallery, Watkins Mind Body Spirit Magazine, Watkins Wisdom Academy, PlayStrategy.org, co-founder of Repeater Books. and the owner and managing director of Watkins Books, Watkins Media, and the Mind Sports Olympiad. Ilfeld is the inventor of Diving chess and the author of Beyond Contemporary Art, co-author of Duchamp versus Einstein and the creator of the Synchronicity Oracle. He is also the host of the Etan Ilfeld Podcast.

== Education ==
Ilfeld graduated at the top of his undergraduate Physics class at Stanford University and was awarded the David Levine Award. He is also a member of Phi Beta Kappa and holds a Masters in Film Studies from the University of Southern California, and a Masters in Interactive Media from Goldsmiths, University of London.

== Books and publishing ==
Ilfeld is the owner of Watkins Books, London's oldest Mind Body Spirit bookshop (established in 1893). He is also the editor-in-chief of the Watkins' Mind Body Spirit magazine. In the February 2011 issue of Watkins' Mind Body Spirit magazine, Ilfeld launched the 100 Spiritual List, which ranks the 100 Most Spiritually Influential Living People in the world. The 100 Spiritual list continues to be published annually.

In 2014, Ilfeld launched Watkins Media and then acquired Watkins Publishing, Nourish, and Angry Robot from Osprey Publishing. Ilfeld launched an additional imprint within Watkins Media called Repeater Books in 2016, which focuses on politics and philosophy. In 2023, Watkins Media launched Datura Books, which primarily publishes crime novels.

In October 2021, Ilfeld bought John Hunt Publishing (JHP), which has more than 2000 titles across over a dozen imprints including O Books, Zero Books, Iff Books and Moon Books.

== Mind sports ==
Ilfeld is a competitive strategy games player having won the World Amateur Poker Championship title at the Mind Sports Olympiad in 2010. Ilfeld is a US Chess Federation National Chess Master, and the inventor of Diving Chess, a chess variant played in a pool such that each player can think during their turn for as long as they can hold their breath underwater. In a 2026 interview with ESPN, Ilfeld said his aim was to make chess “more athletic without diminishing the importance of the actual game.” Beginning as an amateur backgammon player, Ilfeld trained with Tim Cross for six months and then stunned the 2023 Backgammon World Championships by defeating defending champion Sanderson 17-15 in the first round, in what was seen as the tournament's biggest upset. He is currently the chief organizer of the Mind Sports Olympiad. In 2026, he described the event to The Times as “about celebrating the power of games to bring people together to exercise the mind and be social.”

== Media and art ==
In 2007, Ilfeld founded Tenderpixel Gallery, a contemporary art gallery in central London. In 2008, Tenderpixel began hosting an annual experimental film competition known as Tenderflix. Ilfeld produced Pentamind – The Ultimate Mind Sports Championship directed by Hassan Amini, which won best documentary at the 2020 Gen Con Film Festival and follows five of the world's most decorated mind sports athletes as they compete to become the best all-round board games player in the world. He was also an executive producer of the feature films Killer Pad (directed by Robert Englund), and Remainder an adaptation of Tom McCarthy's Remainder (novel) directed by Omer Fast. His article Contemporary Art and Cybernetics was published in the peer-reviewed Leonardo Journal published by MIT Press in February 2012, and his book, Beyond Contemporary Art, was published in October 2012 by Vivays Publishing. Inspired by Marcel Duchamp's archived letters, Duchamp versus Einstein (Angry Robot, 2019) was co-authored with Christopher Hinz as a science fiction novelette featuring Duchamp and Einstein as they are manipulated by an alien visitor. Ilfeld is also a digital artist and his New Kind of Cinema work was showcased at TEDxLondon in 2011, and archived in Rhizome's ArtBase. New Kind of Cinema was programmed in Mathematica and inspired by the usage of cellular automata after training with Stephen Wolfram in Pisa during the summer of 2009.
