= Maureen Hiron =

British games designer and international bridge player (1942–2022)

Maurine Hermione Adele Hiron (née Berman; 22 May 1942 – 8 June 2022), better known as Maureen Hiron, was a British games designer and international bridge player. She is best known as a developer of over 60 board, card, dice, word and question and answer games, including the abstract strategy game Continuo. Her games were published through Hiron Games Ltd., which she founded with her husband in 1982 after retiring from teaching.

== Background ==
Maurine Hermione Adele Herman was born in Whitechapel, London on 22 May 1942. She was a teacher and head of the physical education department of an Inner London comprehensive school. Hiron retired from teaching, aged 32, after a serious injury when a heavy metal air conditioner broke away and fell on her head while she was calling from a window to quieten some unruly children.

Hiron was a passionate bridge player, who participated in national and international championships. She was on the winning England team in both the 1974 and 1975 Lady Milne Trophy, the home countries internationals, and also represented Great Britain in the European Championships of 1974.

Through bridge she met Alan Hiron (1933–1999), the bridge correspondent of The Independent, and in 1990 the gold medalist of the inaugural World Championship Senior Pairs. The couple married in 1983.

In the early 1990s the Hirons moved to Southern Spain for the better climate. Alan died in Málaga on 7 June 1999 from Guillain–Barré syndrome. Maureen took over writing the bridge columns in The Independent and Irish Independent newspapers, and developed further games.

Hiron died at the Royal Berkshire Hospital in Reading on 8 June 2022, aged 80.

== Game design ==
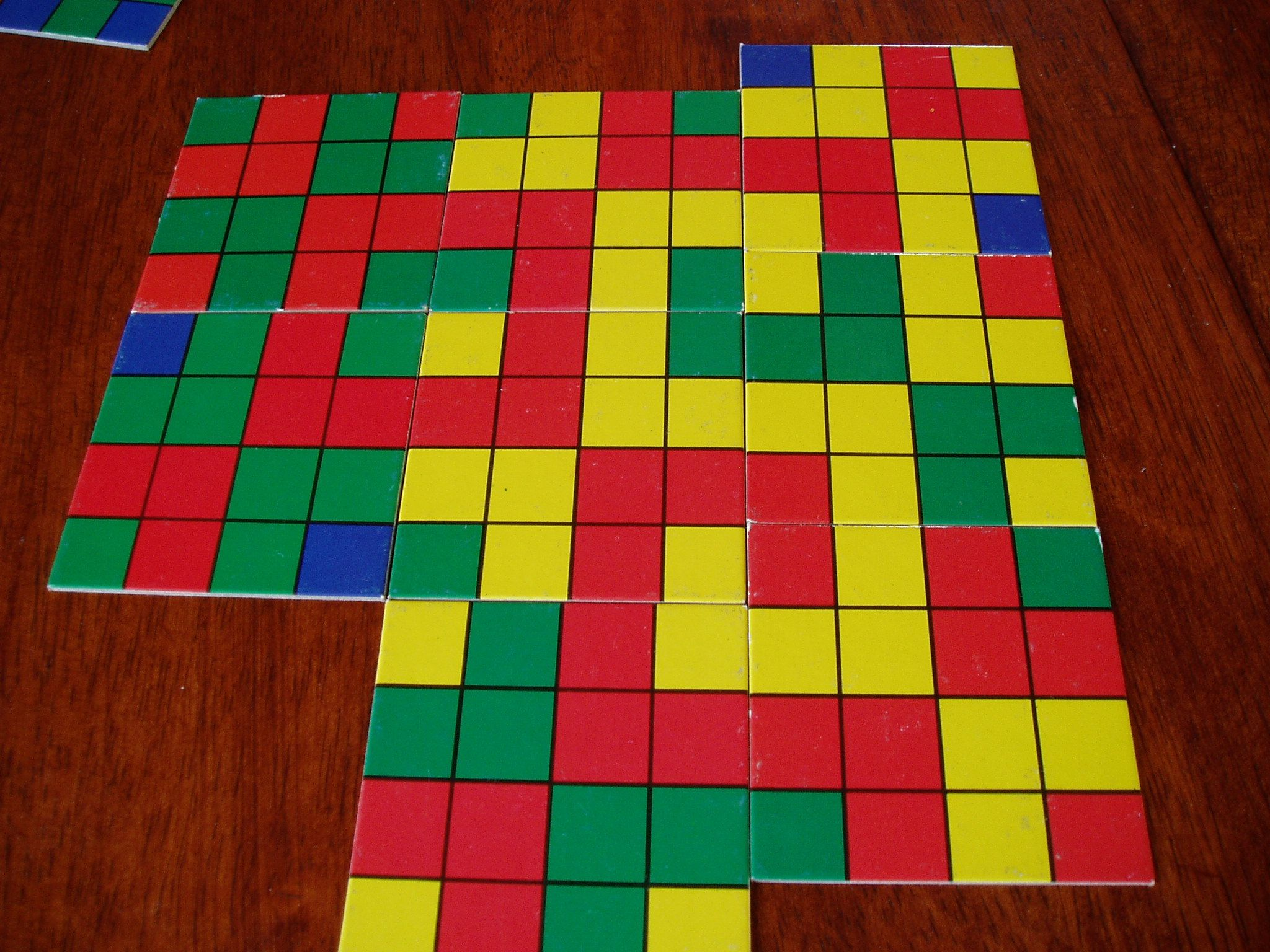
Hiron's Continuo, a game of aligning coloured squares

In 1982 the Hirons founded the games publishing company Hiron Games Ltd, initially to produce and market the game Continuo and later a stream of other games, such as Quizwrangle and Cavendish. Maureen invented the games and Alan was the tester and editor. Continuo, launched on 1 April 1982, became Britain's best-selling game, with around 205,000 sets sold in the UK by the end of that year.

In 1984 Maureen and Alan Hiron were the subject of a 30-minute BBC TV documentary A Will to Win. Shortly afterwards Maureen was diagnosed with cancer and was admitted to the Royal Marsden Hospital. There, using her fellow-patients as play-testers, she developed the game Chip In, which her company manufactured and used in the campaign to raise £25 million for the Royal Marsden, the world's first specialist cancer hospital. The Appeal President was Princess Diana, and the main backing newspaper was the Daily Star. Maureen was voted Londoner of the Year, in London Electricity's Brightening Up London campaign. The then Prime Minister, Margaret Thatcher, even took on Maureen and Alan at Chip In.

== Bridge and writing ==
In 1993 Maureen and Alan competed in partnership at the European Union Bridge Senior Pairs in Portugal and won the bronze medal. Maureen and Alan wrote some beginners' bridge books together, and also quiz books - including The Ultimate Trivia Quiz Games Book, with over 10,000 questions, which reached No. 2 in the British Bestsellers list. (Non-fiction). Maureen also wrote the questions for the first series of Channel 4's popular quiz show Fifteen to One and created puzzles for ITV's The Krypton Factor.

== Selected publications ==
- 1983: The 11+ Bridge Book (with Alan Hiron). Crowood
- 1984, 1991: The Penguin Ultimate Trivia Quiz Game Book (with Alan Hiron) (ISBN 978-1870630849)
- 1985: Trivia Choice (with Alan Hiron & David Elias). Severn House
- 1987: Bridge for Beginners (with Alan Hiron). Crowood (ISBN 978-1852230784)
- 1989: Beginning Bridge (with Alan Hiron). Batsford (ISBN 978-1852233518)
- 1994: Easy Guide to Bridge (with Alan Hiron). Cadogan (ISBN 978-0713486629)
- The Puffin Trivia Quiz Game Book (with Alan Hiron & David Elias)
- Beyond the Ultimate Trivia Quiz Game Book (with Alan Hiron & David Elias). Penguin
- Learn to play aBRIDGEd. Out of the Box (USA)

== Games ==
- 1982: Continuo. Hiron Games, U.S.Games Systems. Schmidt Spiele
- 1983: Quadwrangle. Hiron Games.
- 1983: Quizwrangle Quizwrangle Add Pack 1; Quizwrangle Add Pack 2. Hiron Games
- 1984: Double. Hiron Games
- 1985: Seduxion. Hiron Games
- 1985: Triangulo Continuo. Hiron Games
- 1986: Cavendish. Pin International (Thailand)
- 1986: Duo. Ravensburger
- 1986: The "A" Pack. Hiron Games
- 1987: Top That! Mattel
- 1987: Croque. Hiron Games
- 1987: Rainbow Rummy. Games Workshop
- 1988: CHIP IN. AMIGO (Germany)
- 1989: The Telebugs Game. Hiron Games
- 1990: W.H.Smith Trivia. W.H.Smith Set 2 Trivia
- 1991: 77. Schmidt Spiele
- 1992: Black Rhino. AGMuller (Swiss). Rhino. ASS
- 1993: Hexwrangle (with Graham Lipscombe)
- 1993: Teddy's Party. U.S Games Systems.
- 1994: Superroo AGMuller
- 1995: Alles Oder Nichts (All or Nothing). King (Germany)
- 1996: Cambio Pin International (Thailand). Lagoon
- 1996: Corrrr-uption. Hiron Games
- 1997: Hiron's Word Game
- 1997: Dizzy Dice. Promo special
- 1997: Kniffel Duell Schmidt Spiele
- 1998: Z. Schmidt Spiele
- 1998: Rhombo Continuo. Hiron Games. U.S.G.S (USA)
- 1999: Stick Around. Great American Trading company
- 2000: Di-Cross. Pin International (Thailand)
- 2000: KEETOO (Casino game). Great American Trading Company
- 2000: Trezo. Great American Trading Company
- 2001: Zippy. David Westnedge. Playroom Entertainment
- 2001: Cosmic Cows. Playroom Entertainment
- 2001: Reaction Schmidt Spiele
- 2002: Think Twice. David Westnedge. Playroom Entertainment
- 2002: Qwitch. Out of the Box. Mattel
- 2003: Trinidad. Pin (Thailand)
- 2003: Chekov. David Westnedge, Playroom Entertainment
- 2003: Catz, Ratz & Batz. David Westnedge, Playroom Entertainment
- 2003: Tennis Dice. Special Promo
- 2003: Ping Pong Dice. Special Promo
- 2004: Stratagem. Playroom Entertainment
- 2004: Outfox. Great American Trading Company
- 2004: Collide-O! Playroom Entertainment
- 2005: Top Dogs. Playroom Entertainment
- 2005: Qwacky Wacky. Special promo
- 2006: Mix-Up. Out of the Box
- 2006: Hexago Continuo. U.S.G.S. David Westnedge
- 2006: aBRIDGEd. U.s.g.s.
- 2007: Mr Congo. Schmidt Spiele
- 2008: Slap 'n' Grab. Buffalo Games
- 2008: On the Double. Playroom Entertainment
- 2008: Zoooom. Martinex
- 2009: Super Circles (with Ron & Caron Badkin) Out of the Box. Vennerod.
- 2009: 7Ate9 (published in German as Unter Spannung). Out of the Box
- 2010: Papaya. Special promotion
- 2011: Tripolo. U.S.G.S.
- 2011: Grabbelen. 999 Games
- 2012: Grabolo. Bonaparte (Czech Republic)
- 2012: Dino Alarm. HABA
- 2012: Sectago Triangles. Sectago Rhomboids. Sectago Snowflakes
- 2013: Grabolo Junior. Bonaparte
- 2013: Words of Art. Playroom Entertainment
- 2013: Triple 3. Ravensburger
- 2014: Lichipolo 4. Bonaparte
- 2014: Pamatova. Bonaparte
- 2014: Grabolo 3D. Bonaparte. John Adams
- 2015: I Remember. Bonaparte
- 2015: Carletto
- 2016: MoesWords. Hiron Games
- 2016: Keetoo (NOT casino game!). Bonaparte
- 2017: Eye Catch. Inside Out. Bonaparte
- 2018: Sneek Peek. Brainwaves - The Wise Whale. Kosmos. Thames & Kosmos
- 2019: Colorolo. Bonaparte
- 2019: KIVI Shapes. Martinex (Finland)
- 2019: 7Ate9 Multi. Hoch Spannung. High Voltage. Amigo (Germany)

== Awards ==
- 1995 Mensa Select Game: Continuo
- 1995 Mensa Select Game: Duo
- 1995 Parents Choice Gold Award: Teddy's Party
- 1996 Mensa Select Game: Quadwrangle
- 2018 Game of the Year: KIVI (Finland)
- 2018 Game of the Year: Grabolo Junior (Hungary)
- 2019 German Educational Game Award: Hoch Spannung High Voltage
- 2021 Academy of Adventure Gaming Arts and Design: inducted into Hall of Fame
