= Continuo (game) =

Abstract strategy game

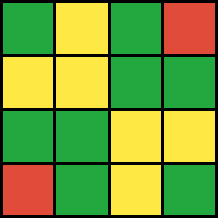
An example of a Continuo tile

Continuo is an abstract strategy game by Maureen Hiron which was first published in 1982 and now distributed in board game form by David Westnedge Ltd. In the U.K and U.S. Games Systems in the U.S. It is played by arranging patterns printed on a deck of 42 cards, each card being printed with a grid of 16 colored squares. The goal is to place cards so that the tiles match as many chains of color as possible. Continuo sold over 200,000 units in the United Kingdom alone within a few months of being launched. Continuo won a 1995 Mensa Select games award. The tag line on the box is "The one rule game for all the family".

Versions of the game have also been published in which the same basic rule is used, but the tiles are triangular or rhombic rather than square and the hexagonal domino type game Hexago was also marketed under the Continuo name. Continuo was endorsed by Omar Sharif.

There has been a Continuo tournament at the Mind Sports Olympiad since 1997, to determine the world champion.

== Rule ==
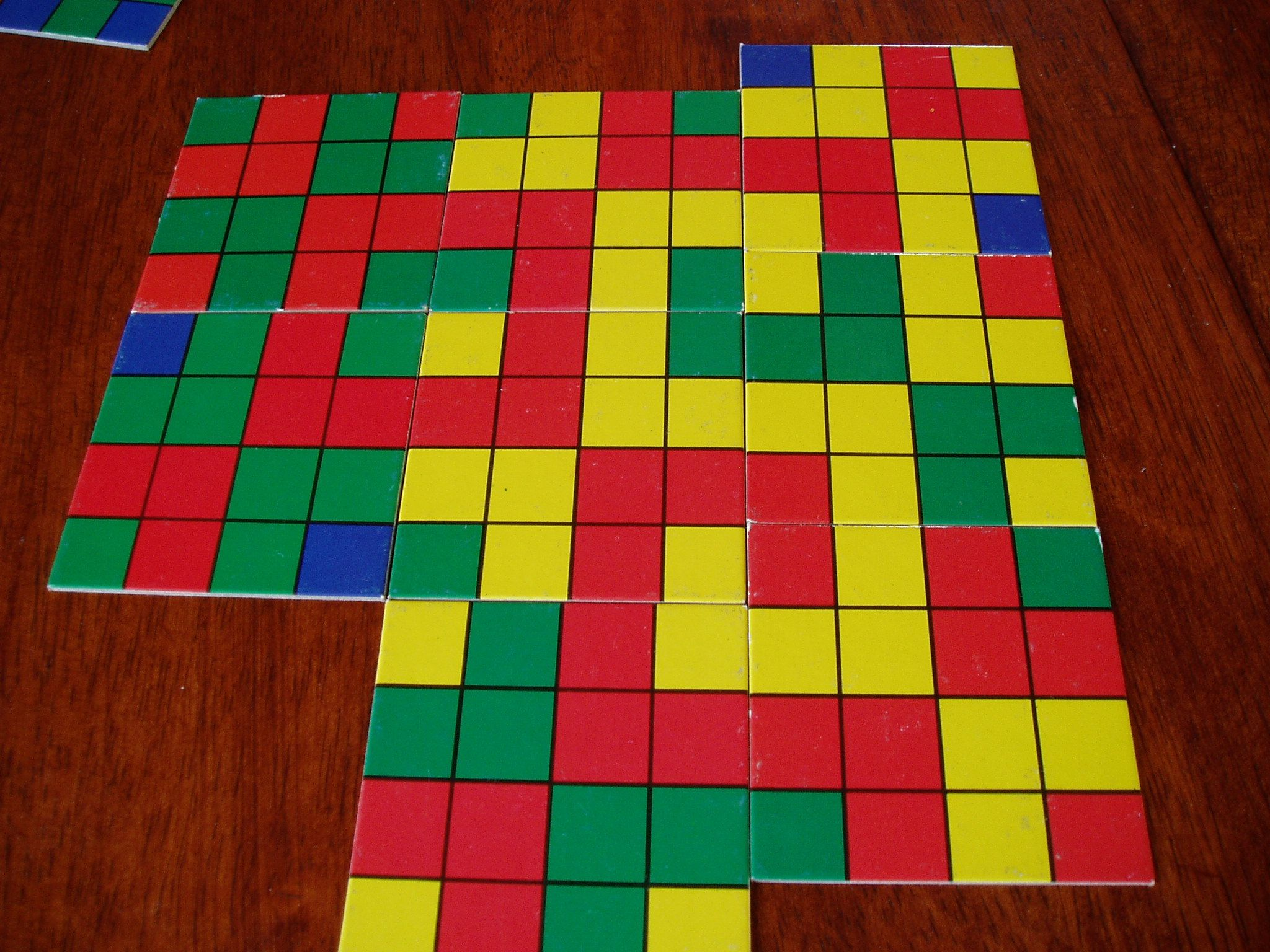
The longest chains in this image are a red loop of 12 squares, and a curved yellow path of 16 squares.

Continuo consists of 42 tiles. These tiles are subdivided into a 4×4 grid of small squares. All of the tiles are diagonally symmetrical with an L-shape of one colour with a single small square of another in the corner. There are 4 colours in total: red, green, blue and yellow.

The aim of the game is to score points by making 'chains' of colour and a point is scored for the length in small squares of each chain that the placed tile makes. A chain has to be squares that touch horizontally or vertically.

== Hexago ==
Maureen Hiron also held the world championships for another of her games; Hexago (or Hexago Continuo). Although being a tile game branded with the same name as Continuo, it is only the immediately touching tiles that affect the score as opposed to the chains in Continuo. It is a game with hexagonal tiles split into 6 triangles each with a colour and a number. Each time a tile is placed touching so that it matches either the segments colour or number, points are scored.

== Champions ==
The Continuo World Champions from 1997 onwards are:

- 1997: (Japan) Osamo Omadero
- 1998: (England) Demis Hassabis
- 1999: (Italy) Tony Niccoli
- 2000: (England) George Hassabis
- 2001: (Sweden) Jan Palmgren
- 2002: (Italy) Dario De Toffoli
- 2003: (England) Mathew Cordell
- 2004: (England) Victoria Westnedge
- 2005: (England) Mathew Cordell
- 2006: (England) Mathew Cordell
- 2007: (England) Mathew Cordell
- 2008: (England) Mathew Cordell
- 2009: (England) Matthew Hathrell
- 2010: (England) Matthew Hathrell
- 2011: (England) David M. Pearce
- 2012: (Italy) Tony Niccoli
- 2013: (England) Maureen Hiron
- 2014: (England) Mathew Cordell
- 2015: (Portugal) Ricardo Jorge Gomes
- 2016: (England) David M. Pearce

The Hexago World Championships have been held once in 2007 during the Mind Sports olympiad

- 2007: (England) David M. Pearce

== Reviews ==
- Games #43
- Jeux & Stratégie #21

== See also ==
- List of world championships in mind sports
- Mind Sports Olympiad
