= JW3 =

Arts centre in London, England

Coordinates: 51.5509°N 0.1847°W

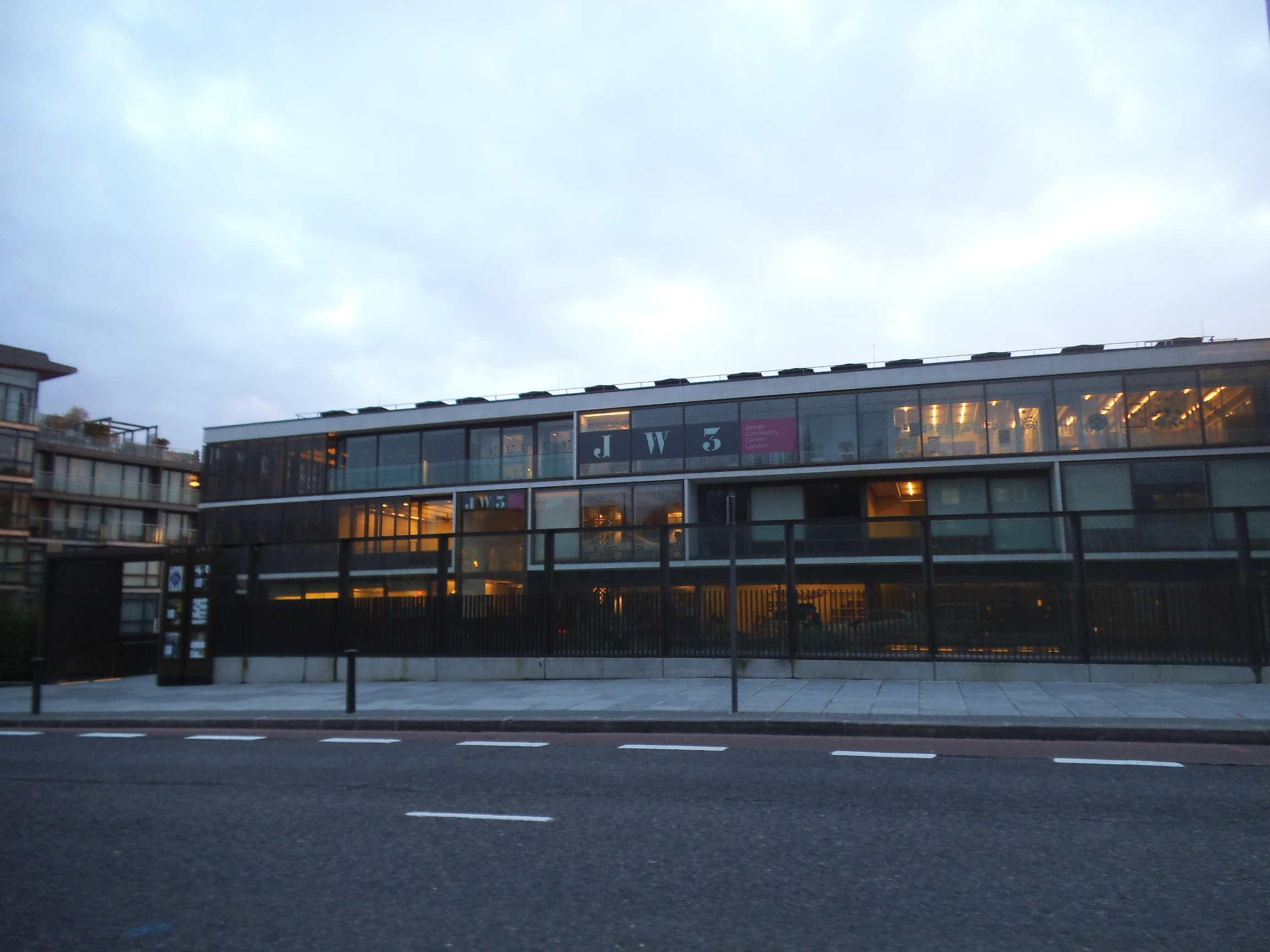
- Interactive map of the JW3 area

General information
- Status: Completed
- Location: Finchley Road; London, NW3
- Completed: 2013

JW3, also known as Jewish Community Centre London, is an arts, culture and entertainment venue, an educational facility and a social and community hub in north London. It is located at 341–351 Finchley Road, London, and opened on 29 September 2013. Describing itself as "a new postcode for Jewish life", the venue's name is a wordplay on its postal address, situated in the NW3 postcode area.

JW3 was the brainchild of Vivien Duffield, who contributed £40m of the project's £50m cost – over the 10 years it took to bring it to reality – through the Clore Duffield Foundation. It was inspired by her 2003 visit to the Jewish Community Centre in Manhattan, New York.

== Facilities ==
The 35,000 square foot building, which includes a 270-seat auditorium, a 60-seat cinema, a restaurant and bar, a demonstration kitchen, dance studios, classrooms and medical consultation rooms, was designed by Lifschutz Davidson Sandilands. The JW3 campus sits on half an acre of land and includes the community centre/arts venue, an outdoor piazza and a tower block of apartments and offices.

JW3 and the London Jewish Cultural Centre (LJCC) merged in March 2015, forming a single, enhanced organisation based at the JW3 site on Finchley Road.

== Organisation ==
JW3's Chief Executive Officer is Raymond Simonson, former executive director of Limmud, who succeeded Nick Viner. Marc Nohr is the Chairman of JW3.

The Jewish Community Centre (JCC) organisation runs a wide programme of events, which it launched in 2005. These target all members of the community, irrespective of affiliation or level of observance. The programme aims to be inclusive and is not religious, instead using its events to provide a gateway into Jewish life and foster a cohesive community.

== Events programme ==
JW3 runs a programme of social, cultural and educational events that mix audiences, age groups and content, encouraging experimentation with ideas and attempting to engage people in new issues.

Previous arts and culture events have ranged from modern interpretations of art and music gigs (e.g. an Idan Raichel Project concert) to events such as Kvetch choir (the complaints choir) that encourages people to enjoy their own creativity and a singalong with the pensioner pop group The Zimmers.

Books-based events have included discussions on books related to the community, with guest author appearances, and debates on topics such as "Has the Left Lost its Way?".

Social action events have included Mitzvah Day, and an initiative in 2007 to bring Jewish and Muslim communities together.

In November 2014, JW3 launched the first ever UK Jewish Comedy Festival, an annual festival celebrating the best in Jewish comedy. Guests have included Ruby Wax, David Baddiel and Stephen Tobolowsky.

In March 2017, JW3 ran a programme of LGBTQ+ related events, marking the 50th anniversary of the Sexual Offences Act (which effectively decriminalised homosexuality in England and Wales). This "GAYW3" programme caused a backlash from a number of rabbis of the Orthodox Jewish community, led by Rabbi Bassous. In July 2017, Rabbi Bassous issued a notice, signed by six other rabbis, calling on their communities to distance themselves from JW3. At the end of November 2017, Rabbi Bassous reissued the letter, this time signed by 25 Orthodox rabbis of north west London.

== Notable guests ==
- King Charles III
- David Beckham
- Grayson Perry
- David McAlmont
- Zoë Wanamaker
- Emilia Kabakov
- Vanessa Kirby
- Richard Curtis
- Jacques Attali
- Lawrence Summers
- Tracy Ann Oberman
- Dominic Grieve
- Garry Kasparov
- Ruby Wax
- David Baddiel
- Anselm Kiefer
- Mike Milken
- John Landis
- Rabbi Lord Jonathan Sacks
- Dr. Ben S. Bernanke
- Nigella Lawson
- Kevin Spacey
- Rabbi Adin Steinsaltz
- David Schneider
- Idan Raichel
- Ed Balls
- Chris Grayling
- Jeremy Corbyn
- Michael Gove
- Nicole Farhi
- Simon Schama
- Emily Maitlis
- Alan Yentob
- Sue Perkins
- Theresa May
- Howard Jacobson
- Achinoam Nini

== The Alan Howard Foundation / JW3 Speaker Series ==
The Alan Howard Foundation / JW3 Speaker Series features conversations, talks and entertainment delivered by leaders and experts in their respective fields who can provide a unique insight into their chosen topics. The lectures are designed to cover broad areas of intellectual thought, including economics, science, history, politics and the arts. The principal aims of the series are to educate and entertain through high level conversation and debate, whilst delivering a rich, diverse and inspiring range of speaking events.

== Sounds Jewish podcast ==
JW3's monthly podcast, Sounds Jewish, produced in partnership with The Guardian, was a monthly magazine-style programme hosted by Jason Solomons. Each "episode" was about 30 minutes in length, with many of them featured on The Guardian's podcast homepage.
