= List of Peking University people =

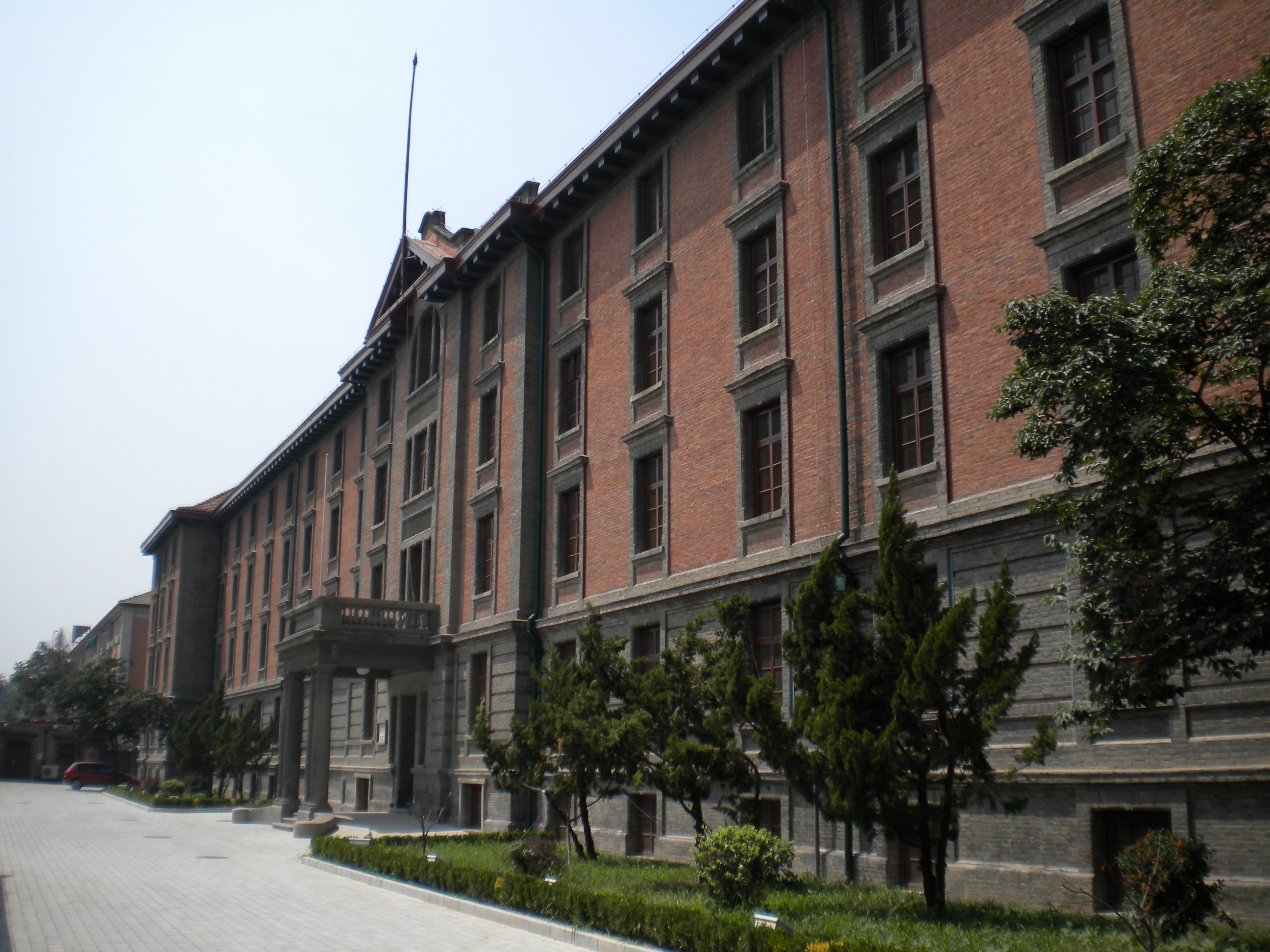
Before moving to the campus of Yenching University in the northwestern suburbs, Peking University was based in the "red building" in downtown Beijing.

This is a list of people associated with Peking University in China. Several notable individuals have been associated with Peking University.

== Faculty ==
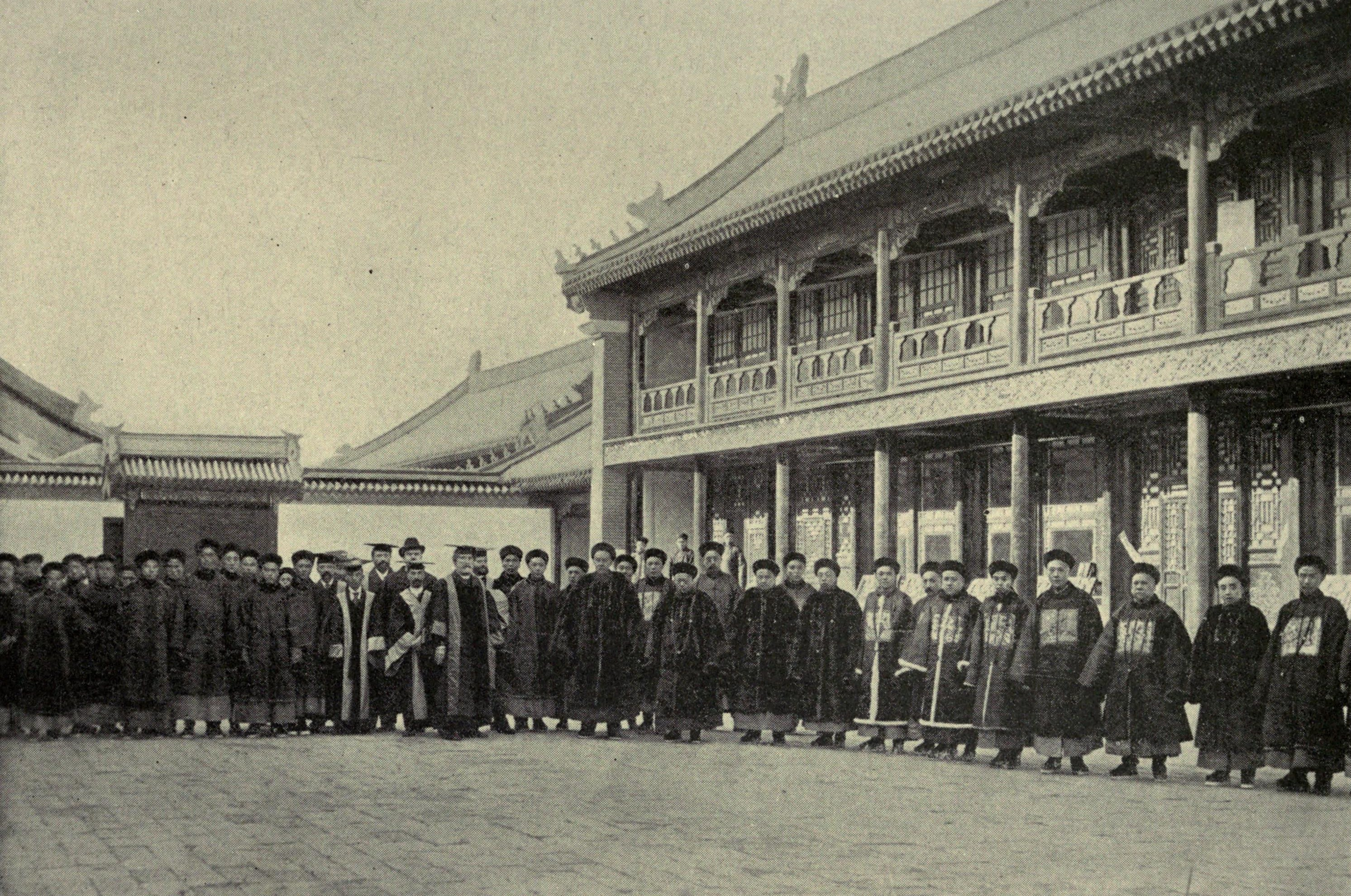
Faculty of the Imperial Capital University in the late Qing Dynasty

- Chen Duxiu – dean of letters, a leader of China's New Culture Movement, later co-founder of Chinese Communist Party
- William Empson – British literary scholar
- Fei Xiaotong – researcher of sociology and anthropology; chairman of China Democratic Alliance.
- Gu Hongming – writer, an advocator of traditional Chinese monarchy. Gu preserved his plait even after the overthrow of Qing Dynasty
- He Weifang – judicial reformist
- Hu Shih – philosopher, writer and a leader of China's New Culture Movement
- Vincenz Hundhausen – professor of German literature and translator of Chinese works into German
- Jian Bozan – historian
- Jiang Menglin – a prominent education reformer in China and former President of Peking University and Zhejiang University
- C. S. Kiang, Founding Dean of the College of Environmental Sciences at Peking University
- Li Haopei – jurist, Judge of International Criminal Court
- Li Shizeng, biology faculty; more prominent as anarchist and Kuomintang politician.
- Liang Shuming – modern neo-Confucianist. Liang was most famous for his critique of Marxist class theory, stating that, despite obvious disparities of wealth, Chinese rural society could not be unambiguously classified along class lines. One and the same family (particularly the large patriarchal lineages found in many regions) would commonly have some members among the "haves" and others among the "have-nots". The class struggle advocated by the Maoists would necessitate kinsmen attacking each other.
- Lin Yutang – writer, inventor of the first Chinese typewriter and a new method of romanizing the Chinese language
- Liu Shipei – historian and philosopher, an advocate of traditional Chinese monarchy
- Lu Xun – a remarkable writer, an important figure of China's New Culture Movement
- Ma Yinchu – a prominent population economist, whose New Population Theory was criticized by Mao since 1957 for two decades. Having examined trends of the early 1950s, Ma argued that further population growth at such high rates would be detrimental to China's development. Therefore, he advocated government control of fertility. In 1979, the Communist Party formally apologises to Ma, stating that "erroneously criticized one person, population mistakenly increased 300,000,000".
- Qian Mu – historian, philosopher and confucian. One of the founders of New Asia College and Chinese University of Hong Kong.
- Qian Xuantong – linguist
- Rao Yi – neuroscientist, dean of the School of Life Sciences since 2007
- Bertrand Russell – lecturer in Philosophy (1920–1921)
- Shen Congwen – writer
- Alexander von Staël-Holstein (1918–1937 in Beijing) – lecturer and professor in Indology, Sinology and Phonetics
- Qixiang Sun – Associate Dean of Peking University's School of Economics and Chair and C. V. Starr Professor in the Department of Risk Management and Insurance
- Wang Keqin – muckraking journalist and blogger
- Wang Tieya – jurist, former Judge of the International Criminal Tribunal for the former Yugoslavia
- Wang Xiaobo – writer
- Ta-You Wu – the "Father of Chinese Physics". His students include Chen Ning Yang and Tsung-Dao Lee, co-winners of the Nobel Prize in Physics in 1957.
- Xu Beihong – the most famous Chinese artist, dean of Beida School of Arts, President of the Central Academy of Fine Arts and chairman of the Chinese Artists' Association.
- Xiaoyu Lu – professor in the School of International Studies
- Yu Dafu – modern Chinese short story writer and poet, author of Ch'en-lun "Sinking" (1921)
- Luo Niansheng – known for translating Ancient Greek literature into Chinese

== Officers and administrators ==
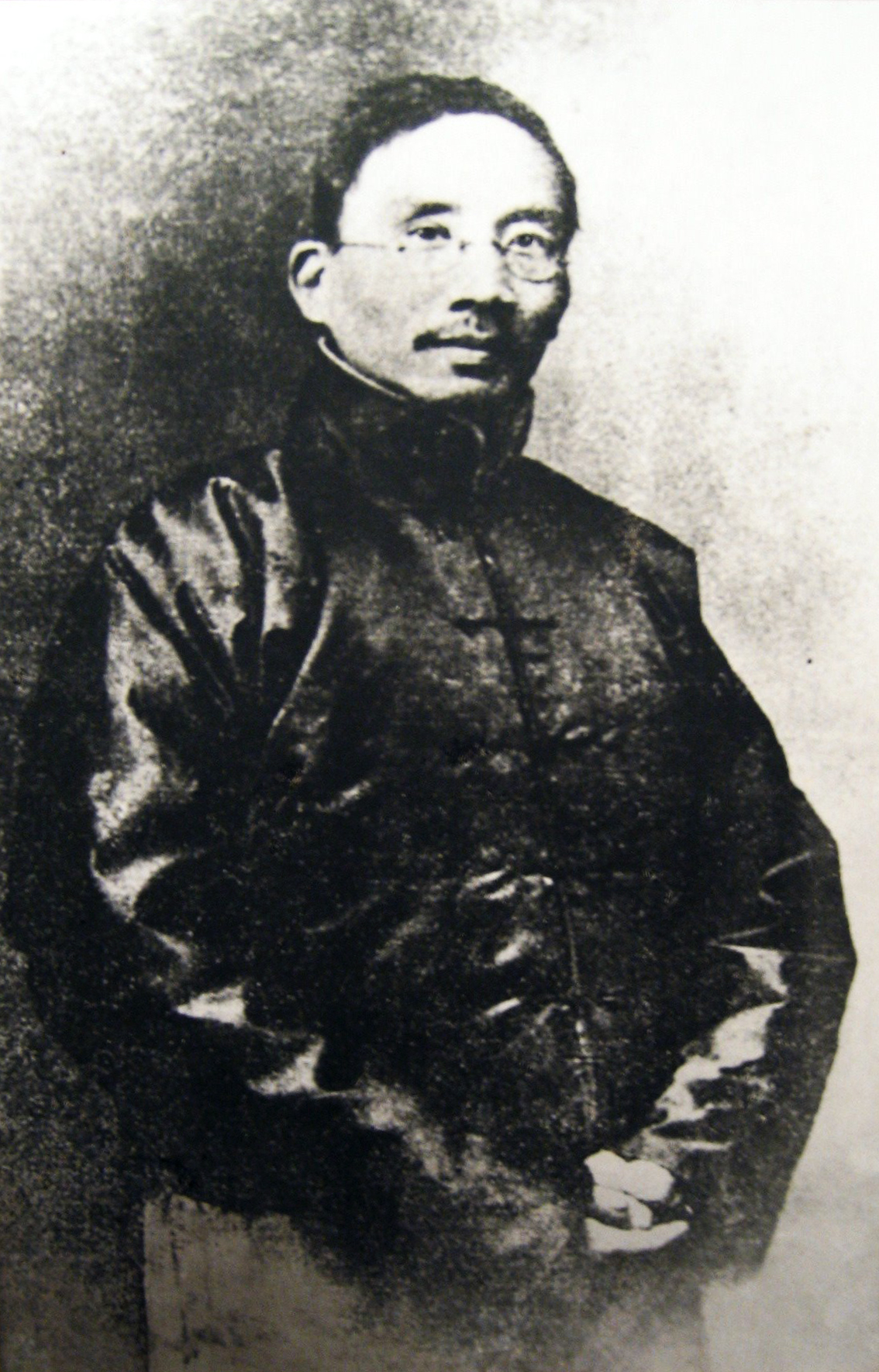
Cai Yuanpei, early University Chancellor

- Cai Yuanpei – early University Chancellor
- Chen Duxiu – Peking University dean, co-founder of Chinese Communist Party, 1st general secretary
- Li Dazhao – head librarian, later co-founder of the Chinese Communist Party
- Yan Fu – early University Chancellor
- Hu Shih – Chancellor (1946–1948)
- Jiang Menglin – president of Peking University

== Alumni ==
=== Writers ===
- Fan Changjiang – journalist and writer
- Zhang Shenfu – writer
- Feng Youlan – philosopher
- David Hawkes – writer and translator
- Dolma Kyab – writer (currently political prisoner)
- Andrew Lau – writer and poet
- Mao Dun – writer and journalist
- Shen Qing – Publisher of Rui, monthly magazine of Financial Times
- Qian Xuantong and Liu Bannong – writers and promotioners of the New Culture Movement
- Lulu Wang – best-selling Dutch-language writer
- Jan Wong – writer (one of the first western students permitted to study since 1949)
- Xu Zhimo – poet
- Zhang Chengzhi – writer
- Zhu Ziqing – poet
- Wen Yuan-ning faculty and author of Chinese classic 'Imperfect Understanding'
- Gui Minhai – writer and bookseller
- Liu Zhenyun- novelist and screenwriter
- Muyesser Abdul'ehed – Uyghur poet and teacher

=== Academics ===
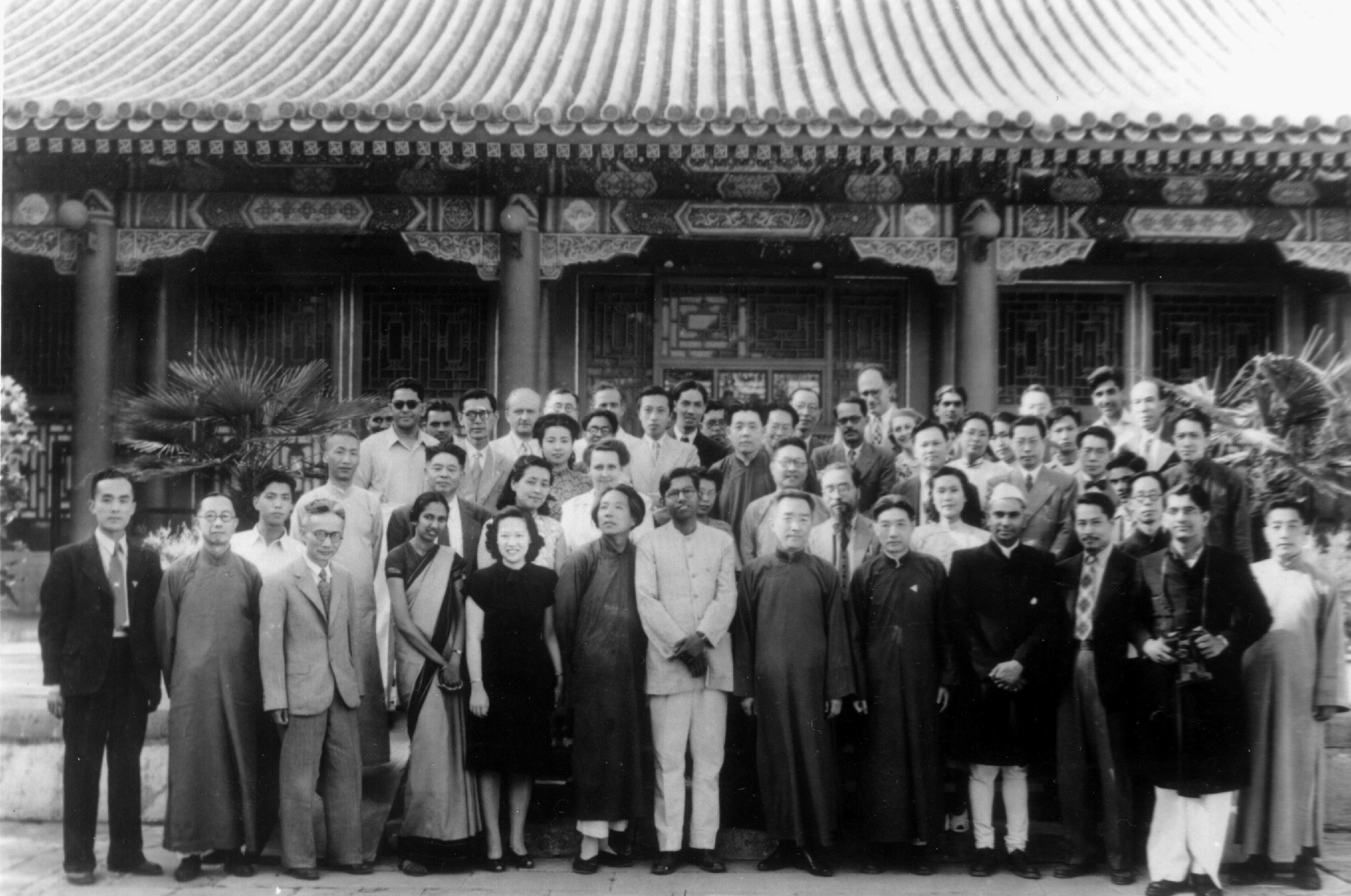
Hu Shih with visiting guests at the Peking University

- Michael Halliday – developed systemic functional grammar
- Tian Gang – mathematician
- Tang Tao – mathematician
- Li Yining – economist
- Tsung-Dao Lee (Li Zhengdao) B.S. 1946 – Honorary professor, physicist, Nobel Prize laureate (physics, 1957)
- Jingjing Liang B.S. 2001– forest ecologist, founder of Science-i and the Global Forest Biodiversity Initiative, and Perdue University faculty
- Yang Zhenning B.S. 1942 – Honorary professor (at Tsinghua as well), physicist, Nobel Prize laureate, 1957
- Justin Yifu Lin – economist (now the chief economist of World Bank)
- Yu Jie – First house church leader to meet an American president (May 2006, meeting George W Bush in the White House)
- Yu Min – physicist, Father of Chinese H-bombs
- Luo Jialun – leader of the May Fourth Movement, president of Tsinghua University
- Fu Sinian – educator and linguist; leader of the May Fourth Movement, creators of the Academia Sinica, former president of National Taiwan University
- Gu Jiegang – a Chinese historian; the founder of the Skeptical school of early Chinese history, known as yigupai; best known for the seven volume work Gushi Bian (古史辨, "Debates on Ancient History").
- Shang Yue – a Chinese economic historian and an author; best known for his contribution on the idea of sprouts of capitalism
- Ren Jiyu – Chinese historian and philosopher, former director of the National Library.
- Deng Jiaxian – a nuclear physics expert; a leading organizer and key contributor to the Chinese nuclear weapon programs.
- Qian Sanqiang – a nuclear physicist and education administrator; a leading organizer and key contributor to the Chinese nuclear weapon programs; former president of Zhejiang University
- Zhu Guangya – a nuclear physicist of China, key contributor to China's "Two Bombs, One Satellite" projects.
- Zhou Guangzhao – expert on particle physics, discoverer of PCAC (partial conservation of axial current), an important step toward the understanding of symmetry breaking; former director of the Chinese Nuclear Weapons Research Institute and president of the Academica Sinica.
- Gang Liu – a mathematician and computer scientist.
- Ji Xianlin – linguist, historian, indologist, writer, vice president of Peking University (since 1978)
- Yitang Zhang, B.S. 1982, M.S. 1985, mathematician Discovered upper bond of prime numbers as close to 70, 000, 000, and won Ostrowski Prize (2013) Cole Prize (2014) Rolf Schock Prize (2014) MacArthur Fellowship (2014).
- Li Bulou – a translator and philosopher.
- Yingying Zhang
- Tu Youyou – a pharmaceutical chemist and educator. She is best known for discovering artemisinin (also known as qinghaosu) and dihydroartemisinin, used to treat malaria, which has saved millions of lives. For her work, Tu received the 2011 Lasker Award in clinical medicine and the 2015 Nobel Prize in Physiology or Medicine jointly with William C. Campbell and Satoshi Ōmura.
- Yuan Tung-li – former director of the National Library of China
- Mi Zhang – professor at Michigan State University
- Shaodong Guo – nutrition scientist, academic and diabetes researcher.
- Shaomin Li – sociologist, economist and academic

=== In politics ===
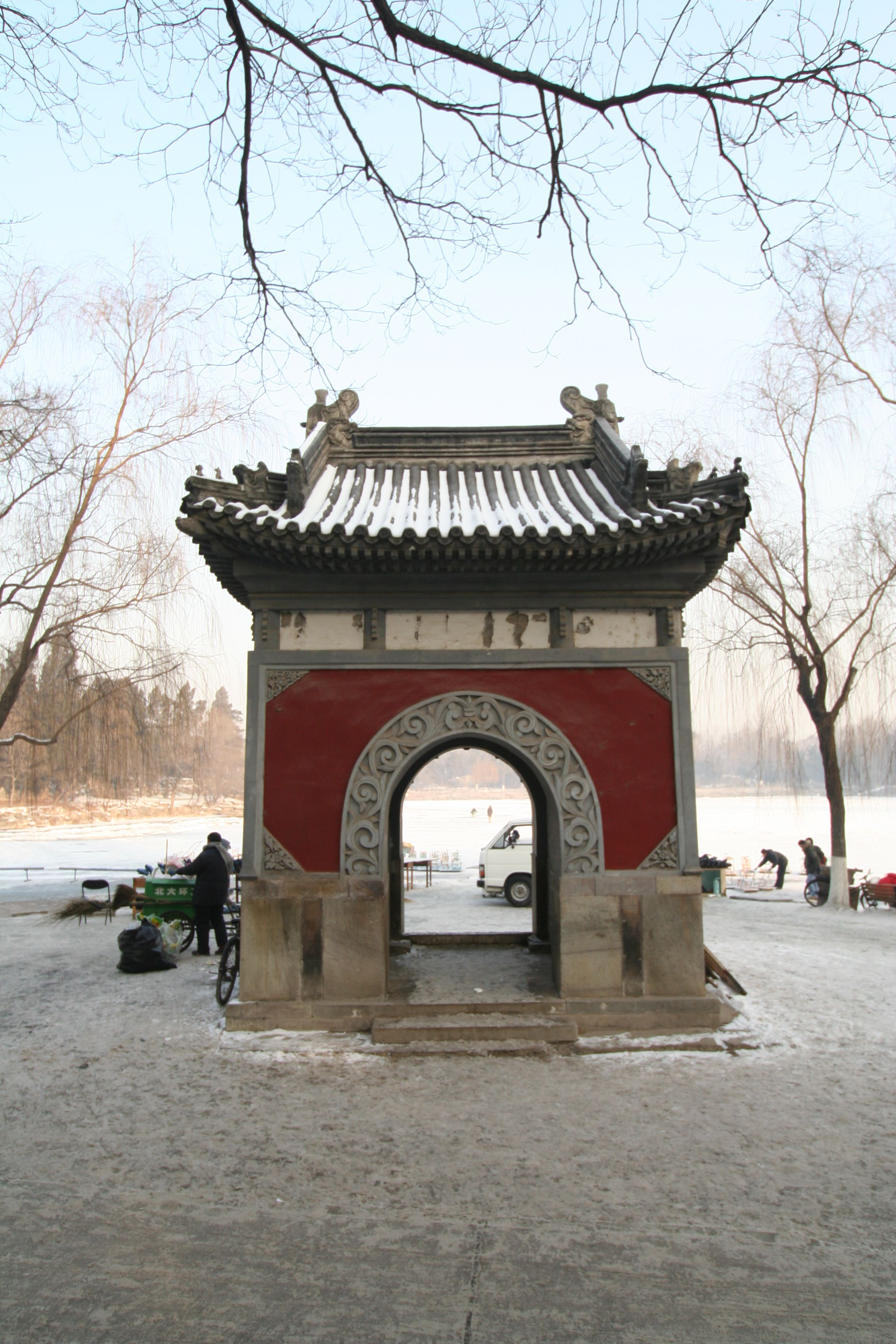
The gate of the Flora Temple on the eastern bank of the Weiming Lake

- Hu Qili – Former members of the Politburo Standing Committee of the Chinese Communist Party
- Bo Xilai – Former Party Secretary General of Chongqing, Former Minister of Commerce, child of Bo Yibo
- Cai Wu – Minister of Culture
- Chen Duxiu – founding member and leader in the Chinese Communist Party
- Deng Nan – Former Vice minister of the State Science and Technology Commission, child of Deng Xiaoping
- Deng Pufang – founder and Chairman of China Disabled Persons' Federation, child of Deng Xiaoping
- Deng Zhongxia – founding member and leader in the Chinese Communist Party
- Fang Lizhi – Spiritual leader of the Tiananmen Protests in 1989
- Guo Gengmao – Governor of Henan Province
- Hu Chunhua – Youngest governor in China, former First Secretary of the Communist Youth League, member of Tuanpai
- Hu Deping – vice chairman of All-China General Chamber of Industry & Commerce Party, Secretary of National Association of Industry and Commerce, and vice minister of the Propaganda Department, child of Hu Yaobang
- Li Keqiang – Premier of China, Politburo Standing Committee member, member of Tuanpai
- Li Yuanchao – Vice President of China, Politburo member, member of Tuanpai
- Lu Hao – First Secretary of Communist Youth League of China
- Meng Hongwei – Interpol-president (2016–2018), purportedly resigned in absentia after being secretly detained
- Mo Menchuan – Vice Chairperson of China National Democratic Construction Association
- Qiu Zhanxuan – undergraduate student at Peking University, head of Peking University Marxist Society.
- Renho – Japanese politician
- Shen Tong – Author, Pro-democracy activist
- K. Natwar Singh – Indian politician
- Mulatu Teshome – President of Ethiopia (2013–2018).
- Wang Dan – Leader of the Tiananmen protests in 1989
- Yuan Chunqing – Governor of Shaanxi Province, Central Committee of the Chinese Communist Party
- Yue Xin – feminist and Marxist activist, participant in The 2018 Jasic Incident.
- Zhang Guotao – founding member and leader in the Chinese Communist Party
- Sam Hou Fai – Chief Executive of Macau

=== In business and media ===
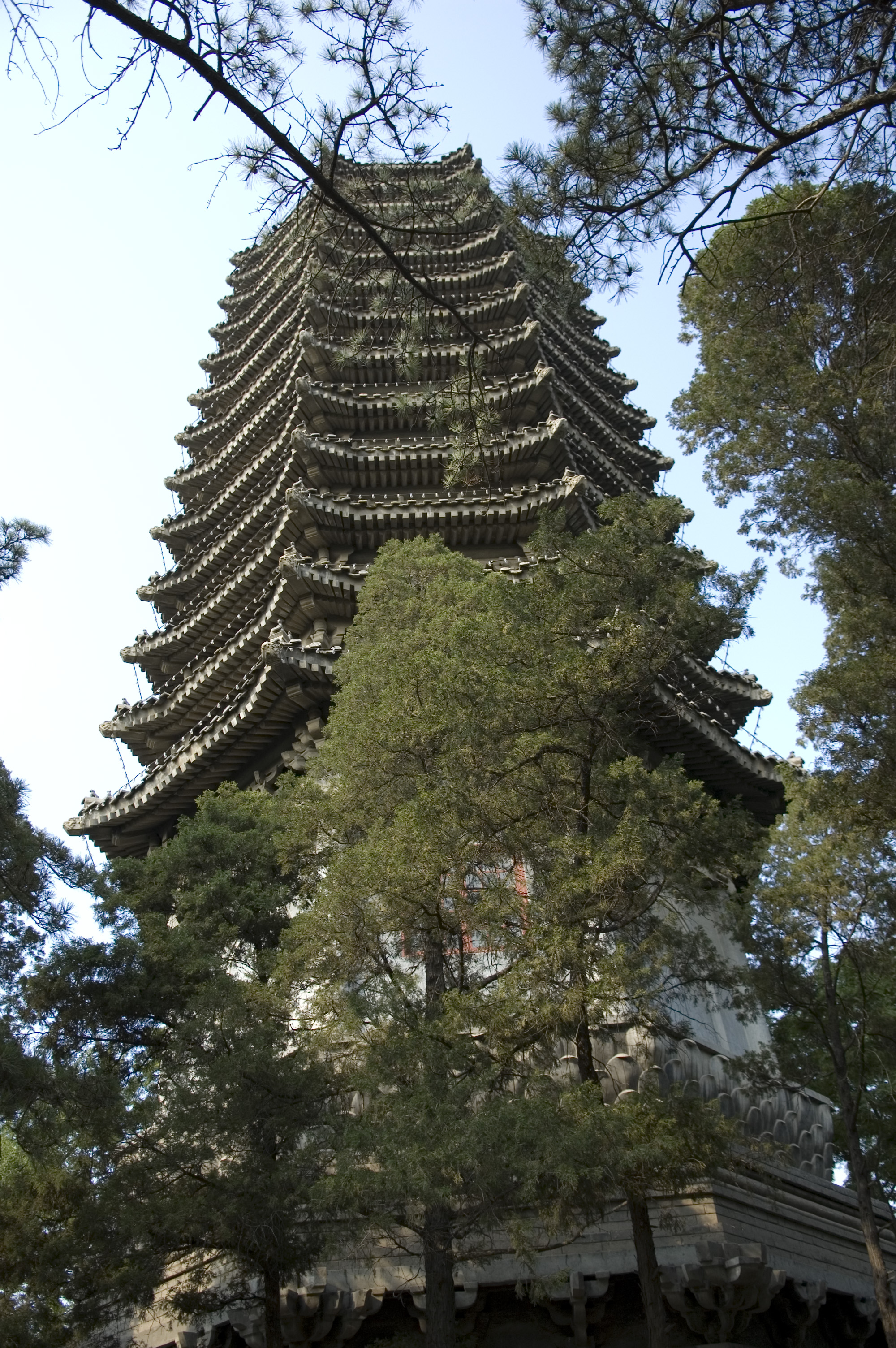
Boya Pagoda by the Weiming Lake, one of the landmarks on the campus

Among the "top 300 richest in China" 27 graduated from Beida, much higher than any other Chinese university. The second ranking school is Zhejiang University, with 17 alumni on the list.

- Robin Li Yanhong – founder of Baidu.com
- Wang Xuan – founder of Founder Co.
- Wang Zhidong – founder of Sina.com
- Yu Minhong – founder of New Oriental Education Group
- Peggy Yu – founder of dangdang.com, the largest online book retailor in Chinese language.
- Li Ning – Olympic gold medalist, founder of Li Ning Group
- Huang Nubo – founder of Zhongkun Real Estate Group
- Yu Liang – CEO of China Vanke Group
- Shen Tong – American founder and president of VFinity
- Hou Yifan – chess player
- Ding Liren – chess player
- Lu Zhengyao – billionaire businessman, chairman of Luckin Coffee
- Raz Galor – Israeli social media figure active in China
- Avram Glazer – American executive Co-Chairman of Manchester United
- Ge Li – Chinese-American founder of WuXi AppTec
- Zhou Chengzhou – filmmaker and artist
- Julie Gao – CFO of ByteDance

== Other ==
Including honorary professors and other associates:

- Harold Acton – British scholar and aesthete
- Mao Zedong – library staff, leader of the Chinese Communist Party
- Shiing Shen Chern – Chinese-American 20th century mathematician

== See also ==
- Category:Peking University alumni
- Category:Academic staff of Peking University
