= Tiananmen Exiles =

Tiananmen Exiles: Voices of the Struggle for Democracy in China
- First edition
- Author: Rowena Xiaoqing He
- Subject: 1989 Tiananmen Movement
- Genre: Non-fiction
- Publisher: Palgrave Macmillan
- Publication date: April 2014

Tiananmen Exiles: Voices of the Struggle for Democracy in China is a scholarly book by Rowena He （何曉清; 何晓清), published by Palgrave Macmillan in 2014. The book has been named one of the Top five China Books by the Asia Society. It is an oral history of Yi Danxuan, Shen Tong, and Wang Dan, exiled student leaders from the 1989 Tiananmen Movement in China. "Tracing the life trajectories of these exiles, from childhood during Mao's Cultural Revolution, adolescence growing up during the reform era, and betrayal and punishment in the aftermath of June 1989, to ongoing struggles in exile", the author explores, "how their idealism was fostered by the very powers that ultimately crushed it, and how such idealism evolved facing the conflicts that historical amnesia, political commitment, ethical action, and personal happiness presented to them in exile." Dan Southerland notes in Christian Science Monitor that the book provides "fresh insights and an appreciation for the challenges that exiled Chinese student leaders faced after they escaped from China." Paul Levine from American Diplomacy states that there was "a fourth major character: the author herself." Tiananmen Exiles is a part of the Palgrave Studies in Oral History and contains a foreword by Perry Link.

== Author ==
Rowena He was born and raised in China and belongs to the "Tiananmen Generation". She received her Ph.D. and M.A. degrees from the University of Toronto and conducted her postdoctoral research at Harvard's Fairbank Center for Chinese Studies. She is a current member at the Institute for Advanced Study at Princeton (2018-2019) working on her manuscript on history, memory, and Chinese student nationalism in the Post-Tiananmen era. As of 2019, she is Associate Professor of History at the Chinese University of Hong Kong. She has previously taught at Harvard University, Wellesley College, and St. Michael's College.

In her profile interview with the New York Times (in both English and Chinese editions), He details the challenges of "teaching Tiananmen to a generation." In the Tiananmen courses she created, she engaged students to organize symposiums to share what they had learned with the general public, and invited faculty Roderick MacFarquhar,members to serve as chairs and discussants, among them, historian Merle Goldman and political scientist who gave closing remarks each year at the student-initiated symposium. For the 25th anniversary of the Movement, He and her students organized a full-day conference which included panels of academics, journalists, and exiled leaders. Based on a Boston Globe story one freshman student from China "told the packed auditorium" that “I took this class because I am the generation that’s being brainwashed... Everything I knew about June 4, 1989, was the fragments I heard from my dad."

The Harvard Magazine reports that "a Chinese man told one student not to take the course because it represented a biased version of history, and each year, some students, usually those from mainland China, ask for their names and appearances to be withheld from the publicly accessible course website." He's teaching has been covered by the Harvard Crimson, Harvard Political Review, the Harvard Magazine, the Wellesley News and other international news outlets.

She received the Harvard University Certificate of Teaching Excellence three consecutive times. In addition to her scholarly work, He writes and speaks widely outside the academia.

== Synopsis ==
He introduces the idea of oral history and addresses her method style, as she swaps between Chinese and English in her interviews, and has combined the methods of life history, narrative inquiry and arts-based inquiry. She starts with an introduction to Wang Dan, Shen Tong, and Yi Danxuan. Wang Dan was a student leader who was arrested after the protests and served fourteen years in two different sentences, he would later be exiled to the United States and would receive his PhD. Shen Tong co-chaired the Student Dialogue Delegation, escaped China six days after the crackdown, and would later publish the autobiography Almost a Revolution. Tong is also still politically active while in exile. Yi Danxuan was the Vice-President of the Guangzhou Patriotic Student Federation, spent 2 years in prison, and was exiled from China but was allowed temporary entry during the Beijing Olympics.

The book starts with a portion of He's memoir Seeds of Fire, which tells of her childhood and her connection to the Tiananmen protests. She tells how her father became disenchanted with the Chinese Communist Party and shows how the school system pushed a pro-Party ideology. She then describes how she exiled herself to Canada and her determination to keep the history and memory alive.

Yi Danxuan was the exile that He was most excited to interview, mainly because of the lack works on him and his efforts outside of Beijing. Yi asked He to "stop thinking about your research for a moment while I talk to you" as the exiles are people and not just subjects; He notes how this was an important moment for herself. In the interview, He asked Yi about his current involvement in the community who were involved in the Tiananmen Protests. She further inquired about his imprisonment, but Yi gave little information to He on this matter. Finally, He inquired how Yi was settling into the United States, and Yi stated that "I don’t enjoy settling down in North America. I won't feel happy."

Shen Tong was one of the more controversial exiles that He interviewed. The main problem that He faced was that Shen has published his own autobiography, He's solution was to interview him on topics not covered in Almost a Revolution. In doing this she predominantly concentrates on his life prior to 1989 and in exile. When He asked Shen about his family and their reactions to his political activism Shen told He that his father was originally unsupportive but that changed with his exile as “the worst thing had already happened. He didn’t need to worry about me when I was abroad."

Much like with Shen, He was faced the challenge of interviewing Wang Dan who is “a symbol of the crushed democracy movement”; as with Shen, He concentrated on his “formative years as the basis of his later life”. Wang and He highlight throughout dialogue the influence of the Cultural Revolution on those involved in the Tiananmen protest.

The author ends her book with a group dialogue between the exiles. The major ideas focused on during the discussion are the ideas of ‘home’, a desire to return to China and a feeling of guilt for their families left in China. The other major issue discussed is how big of a role June 4 should play in their lives and Wang succinctly stated that “June 4 should not be the only meaningful thing in our lives." The author then ends by showing how the exiles have moved on with their lives after the protest.

== Reception ==
Tiananmen Exiles received many positive reviews.

Ian Johnson wrote in the New York Review of Books that He's book is “A moving and very personal account of life as a political emigrant" and "a convincing and powerful account of a central experience in contemporary Chinese life."

Historian Yu Ying-shih commented that "Rowena Xiaoqing He has ingeniously reconstructed the entire movement in a historical perspective not only to unlock the past and explain the present but also to peer into the future of China's sustained struggle against totalitarian tyranny."

Historian Vera Schwarcz commented that "Rowena He's book is an essential corrective," to the "complex legacy of Tiananmen". The Journal of East Asian Libraries noted that "Tiananmen Exiles had organically tied the Cultural Revolution and Tiananmen movement together through the lives and agonies of three former student leaders, and through them, the lives and struggles of their generation."

Björn Alpermann stated that He's book "is a valuable contribution to the literature on the Chinese democracy movement and provides fascinating insights into the world of Chinese political exiles," however, "the 'infighting' among the exiled dissidents—apparently an important consideration to all three of the interviewees—is only alluded to," as He seemed to concentrate more on the "questions of identity and citizenship."

In The Spectator, Jonathan Mirsky stated that there are "few factual errors do not detract from this book’s masterly narrative and analysis." Mirsky further described He's book as "profound" in keeping the Tiananmen movement's significance alive.
