= Munkhshur Narmandakh =

Memory athlete of Mongolia

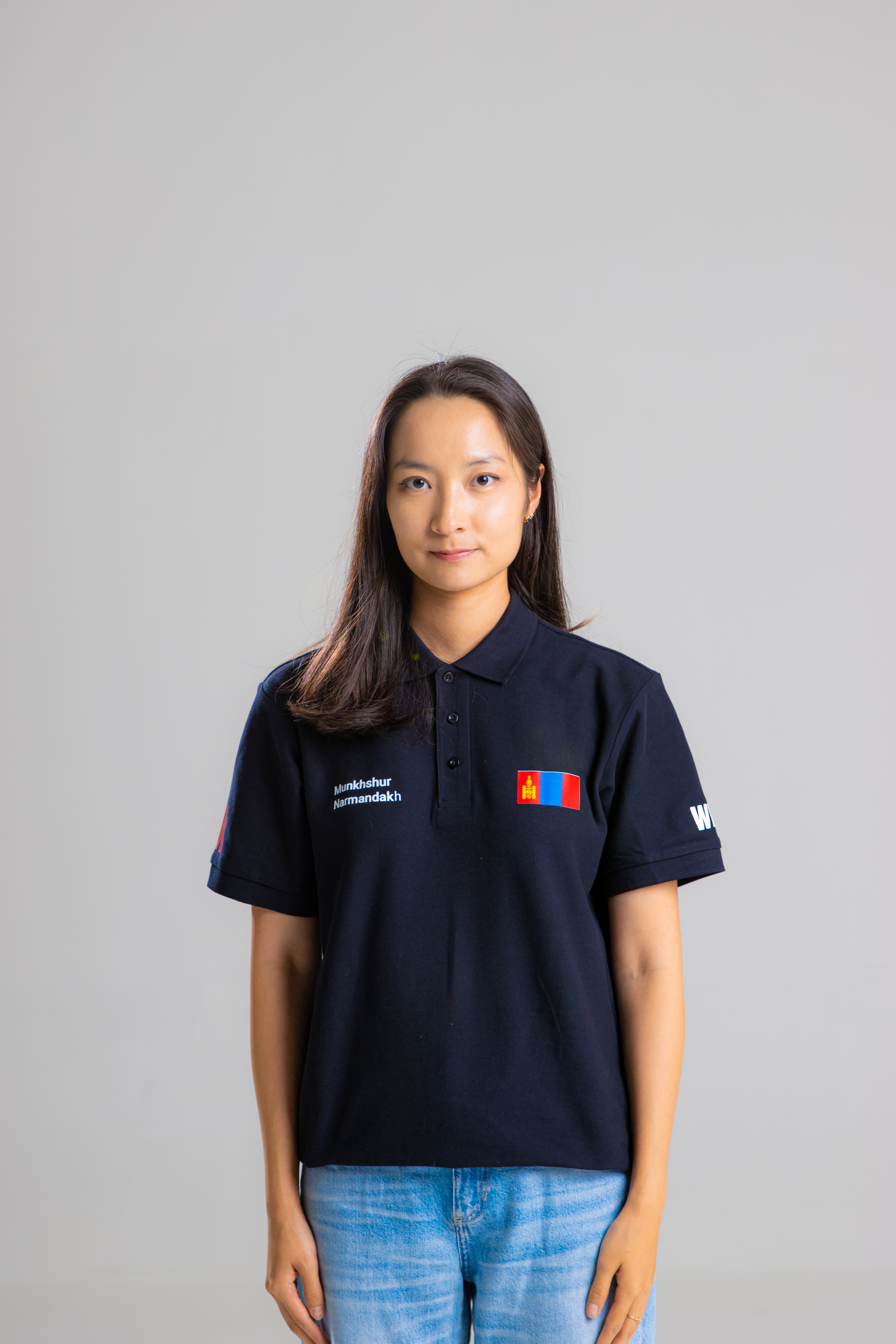

Personal information
- Full name: Munkhshur Narmandakh
- Nationality: Mongolian
- Born: 3 January 1999 (age 27) Ulaanbaatar, Mongolia
- Education: Peking University (Bachelor of History)
- Occupation: Mnemonist
- Years active: 2016–present

Sport
- Sport: Memory
- Rank: No. 1 (June 2017-2024) International Grand Master of Memory

Achievements and titles
- World finals: 1st place (2017, 2021)
- National finals: 1st place (2016)
- Highest world ranking: No. 1 (June 2017)
- Personal bests: 30-minute Binary: 6270 (2017); 5-minute Binary: 1467 (2019); 10-minute Cards: 520(2019); 30-minute Cards: 1092 (2017); Hour Cards: 1776 (2017); 15-minute Numbers: 1300 (2019)

Munkhshur Narmandakh (born 3 January 1999) is a Mongolian memory competitor, world memory champion, and first-ever female world memory champion. The first Mongolian to win the world title, she won both the 2017 and 2021 World Memory Championships and held the IAM world No. 1 ranking.

== Early life and education ==
Narmandakh was born in Ulaanbaatar. She grew up in Ulaanbaatar with her twin sister Enkhshur Narmandakh and attended Peking University, studying history.

== Records ==
Narmandakh has held world records in 3 different memory sport disciplines, each of them involving the memorization of numbers or playing cards.

== See also ==
- Mnemonist
- Extreme Memory Tournament
- List of Peking University people
