= Enkhshur Narmandakh =

Memory athlete of Mongolia (born 1999)

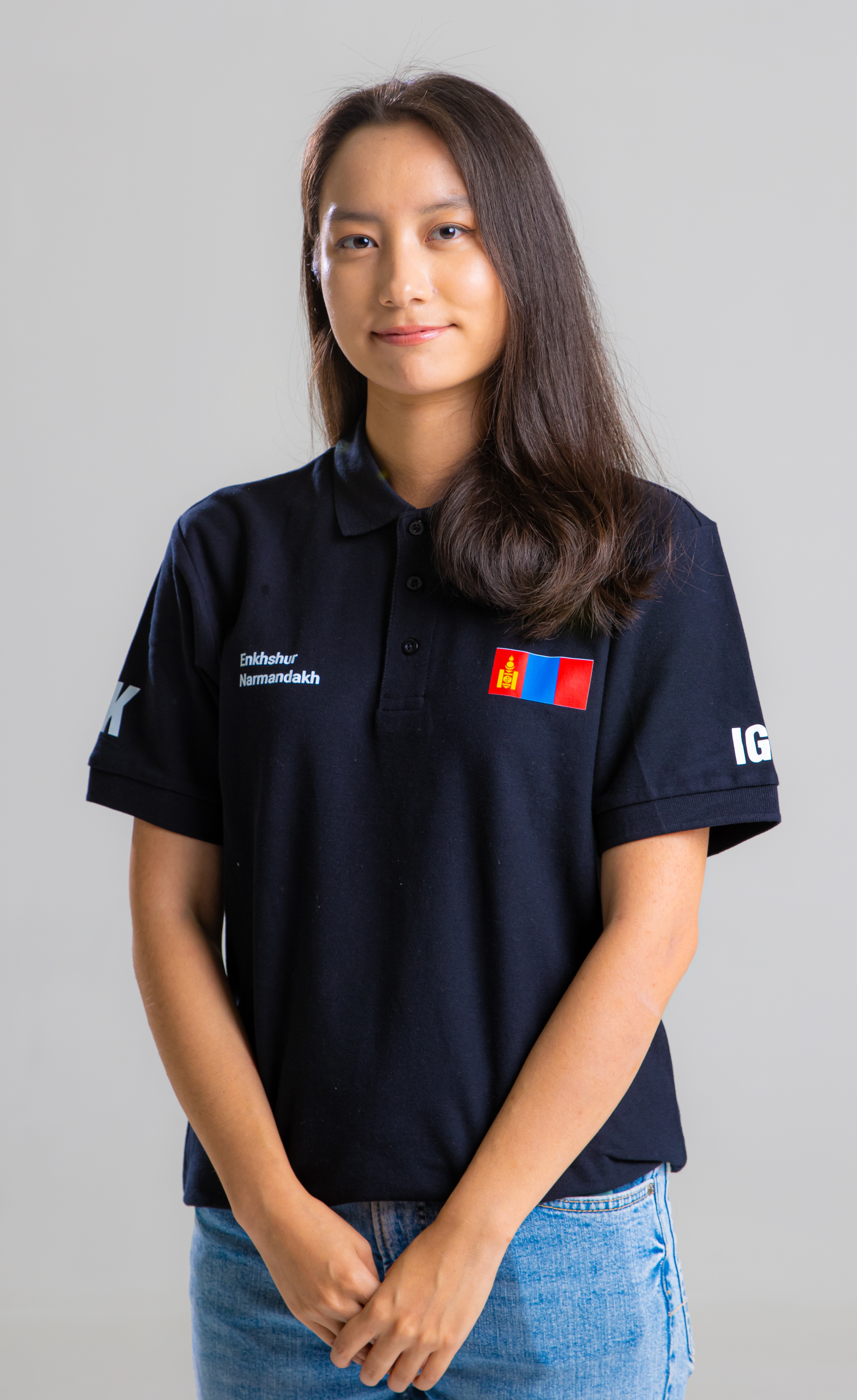

Personal information
- Full name: Enkhshur Narmandakh
- Nationality: Mongolian
- Born: 3 January 1999 (age 27) Ulaanbaatar, Mongolia
- Education: Peking University (Bachelor of History)
- Occupation: Mnemonist
- Years active: 2016–present

Sport
- Sport: Memory
- Rank: No. 2 (June 2017) International Grand Master of Memory

Achievements and titles
- World finals: 2nd place (2017)
- National finals: 2nd place (2016)
- Highest world ranking: No. 2 (June 2017)
- Personal bests: 30-minute Binary: 5325 (2017); 5-minute Binary: 1410 (2019); 10-minute Cards: 479 (2019); 30-minute Cards: 936 (2017); Hour Cards: 1664 (2017); 15-minute Numbers: 1200 (2019)

Enkhshur Narmandakh (born 3 January 1999) is a Mongolian memory competitor, world memory Vice-champion, and Guinness World Records holder.

== Early life and education ==
Narmandakh was born in Ulaanbaatar. She grew up in Ulaanbaatar with her twin sister Munkhshur Narmandakh. She attended Peking University and studied history. Munkhshur and Enkhshur are also Guinness World Record holders for memory sports.

== Winning the Guinness World Record ==
At the 26th World Memory Championships in 2017, Enkhshur memorized 5,445 binary digits in 30 minutes and her twin sister Munkhshur memorized 37 decks of playing cards in an hour-long competition that earned both of them a place in the Guinness Book of World Records.

== Records ==
Narmandakh has held world records in memory sport disciplines, involving the memorization of numbers.

== See also ==
- Mnemonist
- Extreme Memory Tournament
- List of Peking University people
