= Rowena He =

Canadian historian

- 何曉清 何晓清
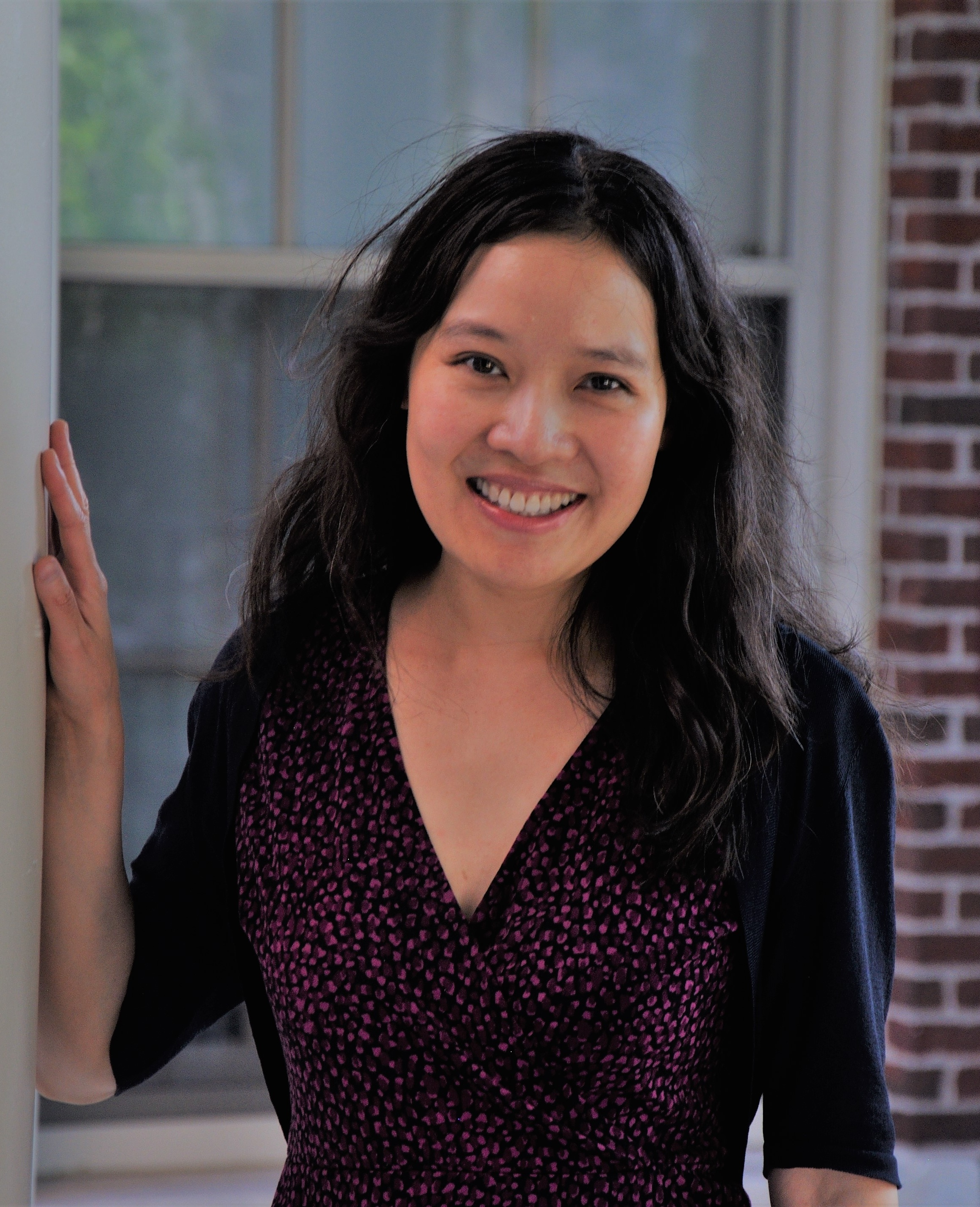
- Education: University of Toronto (Ph.D., M.A.)
- Organization(s): Hoover/Stanford University; Harvard University; IAS Princeton
- Website: https://www.hoover.org/profiles/rowena-he

Rowena Xiaoqing He (Traditional Chinese: 何曉清; Simplified Chinese: 何晓清) is a scholar of modern China, a Research Fellow at the Hoover Institution at Stanford University, and a non-resident associate of Harvard's Fairbank Center for Chinese Studies. The Wall Street Journal named her a "lead scholar on the Tiananmen Movement."

Her first book,Tiananmen Exiles: Voices of the Struggle for Democracy in China, was named in the Top Five Books of 2014 by the Asia Society's China File. The book was positively reviewed in The New York Review of Books, The Wall Street Journal, Financial Times, The Spectator, The New Statesman, The Christian Science Monitor, Human Rights Quarterly, American Diplomacy, and other international periodicals. Her research has been supported by Harvard University’s Fairbank Center for Chinese Studies, the Institute for Advanced Study at Princeton, the National Humanities Center, the Social Sciences and Humanities Research Council of Canada, and the University of Texas at Austin.

Her scholarly opinions are regularly sought by international media outlets. Her op-eds have appeared in The Washington Post, The Diplomat, The Wall Street Journal, The Nation, The Guardian, and The Globe and Mail. She has been a keynote speaker for the World Expression Forum (Norway) and the Canada Human Rights National Symposium, testified before US Congressional Hearings, and delivered lectures for the US State Department and Global Affairs Canada. She was named among the Top 100 Chinese Public Intellectuals 2016.

Her teaching has been featured by Harvard Magazine, The Wellesley News, The New York Times, and The Wall Street Journal. She received the Harvard University Certificate of Teaching Excellence for three consecutive years. She joined the Chinese University of Hong Kong in 2019 and received its Faculty of Arts Outstanding Teaching Award in 2020 and 2021.

== Life ==
=== Early life ===
She was born, raised, and educated in Guangzhou, Guangdong. In 1989, at the age of 17, she participated in the "Guangdong-Hong Kong Grand Parade" as a high school student from Guangzhou. She completed her undergraduate studies at South China Normal University. She migrated to Canada in the late 1990s and earned her master's and doctoral degrees from the University of Toronto in 2002 and 2008, respectively.

=== Harvard ===
In 2008, she started her research at Harvard's Fairbank Center for China Studies as a postdoctoral fellow of the Social Sciences and Humanities Research Council of Canada (SSHRC). As SSHRC's top female recipient of the year, she was nominated for the Royal Society of Canada's Alice Wilson Award. At Harvard (2008–2015), she conducted research under the mentorship of political scientist Roderick MacFarquhar and historian Merle Goldman and also created her award-winning course Rebels with a Cause: Tiananmen in History and Memory.

=== Hong Kong ===
In 2019, upon completing her fellowship at IAS Princeton, she joined the Chinese University of Hong Kong (CUHK) as an associate professor of History amid the region's unprecedented social movement. Despite the COVID shut-down on campus and Beijing's imposition of the National Security Law in 2020 that threatened academic freedom in Hong Kong, many of her modern China courses, including "Ordinary Voices, Extraordinary Stories: History and Memory in Documentaries and Biographies," were popular and well-received among students. Confronted by radical nationalistic Chinese students over the years for teaching forbidden memories disapproved by the Chinese Communist Party (CCP), she continued to engage in dialogues both inside and outside the classroom, and eventually won the support of Chinese students after taking her classes. She received CUHK's Faculty of Arts Outstanding Teaching Award in 2020 and 2021. The attacks from Chinese students motivated her to work on research topics related to historical memory, youth values, and student nationalism.

In October 2023, the Financial Times broke the news that He had been denied a work visa to return to her professorship at CUHK. Ming Pao, Hong Kong's leading intellectual newspaper, published an A1 front-page story of her situation despite increasing political pressure from Beijing. The news was widely reported by major media internationally. In a feature story of He by the Globe and Mail of Canada, Sophie Richardson, former China director of Human Rights Watch, was cited describing He as "an extraordinary scholar-teacher," and that her visa denial was "further evidence" of Chinese government's "censorship and revisionism in academia." In a letter addressed to the CCP General Secretary Xi Jinping dated November 8, 2023, the Committee of Concerned Scientists expressed its concern that "this incident is part of a recurring pattern of abusing Hong Kong's judicial system to silence dissent." PEN America's website indicates her case being "active" in 2026.

Immediately after the official ban, He's hour-long interview in Cantonese with Simon Shen, former Political Science professor at CUHK was viewed by over 100,000 overnight. Hong Kongers left messages to express their appreciation for her perseverance to protect historical memory being erased by the CCP, and her dedication to students during the 2019 social movement that was eventually cracked down. She later gave another hour-long interview with the Voice of America, in Mandarin this time, viewed by over 340,000.

=== Exile ===
He continued in exile to give talks organized by academic institutions and NGOs locally and internationally, and "each was aimed at speaking out for those who cannot," as reported by the Associated Press. Her talk on Valentine's Day in 2024 at her alma mater, the University of Toronto, was so packed that several dozen people were waiting in line after the seminar room was closed. Former CUHK students came with flowers sent by their professors back home. In Hong Kong, students left flowers outside her old office on graduation days.

In December 2024, in her third testimony before the Congressional-Executive Commission on China (CECC) on The Preservation of Memory: Combating the CCP's Historical Revisionism and Erasure of Culture, Chris Smith, Chairman of the Hearing, introduced her as one among the "white martyrs" "who are stripped of position and prestige" and "suffer because they are unbowed in their commitment to the truth, regardless of the consequences."

In her feature interview with CBC As It Happens, she said that the candle lights in Hong Kong's Victoria Park each year was what made her "carry on till tomorrow." She wrote in a Guardian op-ed that "the image of the endless sea of candles has become as iconic as the Tank Man, reminding us that Tiananmen is not just about repression, but also about hope."

== Reception ==
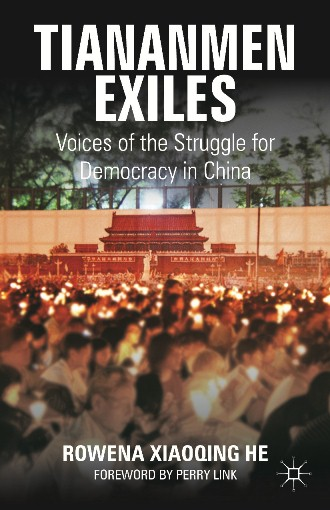
Tiananmen Exiles: Voices of the Struggle for Democracy in China by Rowena He

The New York Review of Books noted that He's book is "A moving and very personal account of life as a political emigrant" and "a convincing and powerful account of a central experience in contemporary Chinese life."

Princeton historian Yu Ying-shih commented that "Rowena Xiaoqing He has ingeniously reconstructed the entire movement in a historical perspective not only to unlock the past and explain the present but also to peer into the future of China's sustained struggle against totalitarian tyranny."

Modern China Historian Vera Schwarcz commented that "Rowena He's book is an essential corrective," to the "complex legacy of Tiananmen". The Journal of East Asian Libraries noted that "Tiananmen Exiles had organically tied the Cultural Revolution and Tiananmen movement together through the lives and agonies of three former student leaders, and through them, the lives and struggles of their generation."

Björn Alpermann's review in the China Journal commented that He's book "is a valuable contribution to the literature on the Chinese democracy movement and provides fascinating insights into the world of Chinese political exiles," however, "the 'infighting' among the exiled dissidents—apparently an important consideration to all three of the interviewees—is only alluded to," as He seemed to concentrate more on the "questions of identity and citizenship."

In The Spectator, Jonathan Mirsky described He's book as "profound" in keeping the Tiananmen movement's significance alive.

== Bibliography ==
- Tiananmen Exiles: Voices of the Struggle for Democracy in China. New York: Palgrave Macmillan, April 2014. ISBN 978-113743832-4
