= Kiang (disambiguation) =

A kiang is a large mammal belonging to the horse family.

Kiang may also refer to:

- 3751 Kiang, a main-belt asteroid
- Kiang (Gambia), a region in the Gambia
- C. S. Kiang (fl. 1978–2006), academic in physics and atmospheric sciences
- Nelson Kiang (fl. 1952–1990s), academic in auditory physiology

== See also ==
- Horse
- Tsao-kiang, a Chinese gunboat
- Unicorn
- USS Ta-Kiang (1862), a Union Navy steamer during the American Civil War
- Wild ass (disambiguation)
