= Tiananmen: The People Versus the Party =

2019 American documentary film

Tiananmen: The People Versus the Party is a PBS two-hour special about the 1989 Tiananmen Square protests and massacre.

== About the show ==
Student leaders & Main Narrators
Name	Origin and affiliation
Shen Tong	Beijing; Peking University
Wu'erkaixi (Örkesh)	Xinjiang; Beijing Normal University
Wang Dan	Beijing; Peking University

On June 4, 1989, a large and peaceful pro-democracy demonstration was violently suppressed, resulting in a disputed number of deaths. The events had a significant impact on the political, as well as, social development of China.

The film premiered on June 25, 2019. It features eyewitness accounts from several people who were present during the events, including a communist party member who was interviewed secretly. It also makes use of The Tiananmen Papers.
