= Shen Qing =

- Born: China, PRC
- Education: Beijing University
- Title: Publisher of Rui Magazine of Financial Times

Shen Qing is a lifestyle and fashion publisher in China, writing weekly, monthly magazine or blog articles with a following in a number of Chinese foreign joint venture publications. She also serves as publisher of the Chinese edition of the monthly How to Spend It column of the Financial Times. Her previous publishing career includes associate publisher of Life Magazine.

A law department graduate of Peking University, Shen went to the United States for her graduate study in the San Francisco Bay Area of California. She was briefly in mainstream American news when her activist younger brother Shen Tong was arrested in China in 1992. The two have been in media ventures together including VFinity

== Sources ==
- FT launches magazine for China's wealthy
- Bride Magazine Profile in China on Shen Qing
- Fortune Small Business (FSB) A Tiananmen Rebel turns Capitalist
