= Xiaoyu Lu =

Chinese writer

Xiaoyu Lu (Chinese: 吕晓宇) is a Chinese writer and international relations scholar who explores the themes of individuals and narratives in global conflicts and China's foreign policy. He has worked in a number of conflict cases, including Ukraine, Iran, Palestine, Syria, Lebanon, Venezuela and Myanmar. He was a staff member at the United Nations Development Programme and now is an assistant professor in the School of International Studies at Peking University.

== Biography ==
Xiaoyu Lu was born in Hubei, China. He received a MA (honours) in International Relations and Social Anthropology from University of St Andrews and MSc and DPhil in Politics at St Antony's College, University of Oxford. He was the 2017 Dahrendorf Scholar at the European Studies Centre at the University of Oxford, supervised by Timothy Garton Ash. From 2019 to 2021, he was a Research Fellow at the Strategic and Defence Studies Centre at the Australian National University. In 2021, he began to work in the School of International Studies, Peking University. He is 2022–23 Berggruen China Center Fellow.

== Work ==
Lu's academic works are in the field of international relations. During his DPhil study, he worked at the United Nations Development Programme as a policy consultant and completed an ethnographic account of international institutions in China, which was reflected in his monograph: Norms, Storytelling and International Institutions in China: The Imperative to Narrate (Palgrave Macmillan, 2021). He drew on the issues of human rights, rule of law and development cooperation in the context of China and the world. His travel and later research focus on international conflicts and crises, with field trips to Myanmar, Colombia, Venezuela and Syria, and featured non-fictions covering these trips.

In 2016, Lu participated as an observer in the Peruvian politician Alejandro Toledo's election campaign. He later recorded the experience in the non-fiction book Lima Dream: When a Chinese Wanders into an Election. During the COVID-19 pandemic from 2019 to 2020, Lu was in his hometown Wuhan. His commentary Wuhan is not a City of Fear was published by The Guardian, and his diaries were translated and partly published in the China Channel of Los Angeles Review of Books.

In 2023, Lu undertook a field trip to Ukraine during the ongoing Russo-Ukrainian War. During the visit he conducted interviews with Ukrainian President Volodymyr Zelenskyy and Nobel Peace Prize laureate and human rights lawyer Oleksandra Matviichuk, chair of the Center for Civil Liberties. The same year he published his debut novel 水下之人 (The Man Under the Water), marking his formal entry into literary fiction alongside his scholarly and non-fiction work. In 2024, Lu traveled to Palestine and Israel. His peer-reviewed academic output spans several leading international journals, including Human Rights Quarterly, International Affairs, Middle East Critique, and The Pacific Review, covering themes of norm diffusion, armed conflict, mediation, and China's role in global politics.
