= Sun Qixiang =

Qixiang Sun (孙祁祥) is associate dean of Peking University's school of economics and chair and C. V. Starr Professor in the Department of Risk Management and Insurance. She also is member and administrative director of the China Finance Council's academic research committee.

Professor Sun often serves as an academic moderator at the International Insurance Society's annual meeting, and has been a visiting professor at Harvard University. Her major areas of research include: development strategies of the Chinese insurance industry; comparative studies of the international insurance market; and financial integration.

== See also ==
- China Insurance Regulatory Commission
- Insurance companies in China
