= Yuan Tung-li =

Chinese library administrator and bibliographer

Yuan Tung-li (simplified Chinese: 袁同礼; traditional Chinese: 袁同禮; pinyin: Yúan Tónglǐ; Wade–Giles: Yuan Tung-li; 1895 – 1965) was a Chinese library administrator and bibliographer. He headed the National Library of China and was later consultant in Chinese literature at the United States Library of Congress.

== Biography ==
Yuan was born in Beijing in 1895 and graduated from the University of Peking in 1916. He then came to the United States and earned a BA from Columbia College in 1922. He also earned a Bachelor of Library Science degree from New York State Library School at Albany in 1923.

Yuan returned to China in 1923 and became librarian for National Kwangtung University. In 1925, Yuan was appointed librarian and professor of bibliography at Peking University. In 1926, Yuan became director Peking Metropolitan Library, which in 1929 merged with the old National Library to form the National Library of Peiping, a predecessor to the current National Library of China. Yuan was associate director of the National Library until 1942, when he became director, succeeding Cai Yuanpei. As director, Yuan transformed the institution into the largest library in China and revolutionized library administration and services by applying Western methodology to traditional Chinese scholarship.

In 1945, Yuan became an advisor to the Chinese delegation to the United Nations. He received an honorary Doctor of Laws degree from the University of Pittsburgh in 1945. In 1949, he left China for the United States. He served as chief bibliographer for the Stanford University Research Institute and joined the staff of the Library of Congress until his death in 1965.

Yuan died in Washington, D.C., on February 6, 1965, at the age of 69.
