= Li Bulou =

Chinese translator and philosopher

Li Bulou (Chinese: 李步楼, born January 1938) is a Chinese translator and philosopher with a specialization in western philosophy and Marxism. He is also a member of the Academy of Social Sciences of Hubei, China. Li was previously a provincial official of the Publicity Department of the Chinese Communist Party.

Li was born into a family of farmers in the southeastern province of Jiangsu. Li obtained his bachelor's degree from the university of Beijing in 1962. In 1966, he acquired his master's degree in the same university with a specialization of "Foreign philosophy". During his study as a post-graduate student, Li's mentor was Hong Qian, one of the representative members of Wiener Kreis in China.

In 1991, a collection of academic papers that focus on the influence of Western ideologies on contemporary China was edited by Li. Li translated numerous works of the western philosophers of the 20th century. One of his major translation is the translation of Philosophical Investigations, a monumental work of the Austrian philosopher Ludwig Wittgenstein. In addition, he also translated the book Process and Reality, a work by Alfred North Whitehead.

In 1994, Li received the honor of "Experts with outstanding contributions" given by the State Council of the People's Republic of China.
