= Almost a Revolution =

Autobiography by Shen Tong

- Author: Shen Tong with Marianne Yen
- Language: English
- Published: 1990 Houghton Mifflin (U.S. first edition); 1998 University of Michigan Press (U.S. second edition)
- Publication place: United States
- Media type: Print (Hardback & Paperback); also audio book
- Pages: 344 p. (US paperback second edition)
- ISBN: 978-0-472-08557-6 (US paperback second edition)
- OCLC: 39229792
- Dewey Decimal: 951.05/8 21
- LC Class: DS779.32 .S47 1998

Almost a Revolution is an autobiography by Shen Tong (沈彤), one of the student leaders during the 1989 Tiananmen Square protests and massacre in Beijing, China, written with former The Washington Post writer Marianne Yen.

== Genre ==
Published in 1990 by Houghton Mifflin Company, Almost A Revolution is a memoir categorized under China, History, Tiananmen Square Incident, 1989. ISBN 0-395-54693-1 (cloth).

== Synopsis ==
Shen Tong was born on July 30, 1968, on an army base in Zhangjiakou, a small town northwest of Beijing. His parents worked for the People's Liberation Army. Shen's father taught Korean, and his mother worked as a medic in the army hospital. They moved to Beijing right after Shen was born. Their house was located in an alley near the corner of Xidan and Changan Avenue, which was only a fifteen-minute walk from Tiananmen Square.

The first half of the book, "Beginnings," describes Shen's life from childhood until his first year at Peking University (Beida). As the child of two intellectuals, Shen was exposed to political activities at an early age. He remembered how his parents avoided getting caught by destroying the Big-character posters (dazibao) they copied from Tiananmen Square in 1976 after Premier Zhou Enlai died. He also experienced the Democracy Wall Movement in the winter of 1978-79 during which his father often took him to visit the Democracy Wall. Near the end of high school, Shen spent few weeks at Beida campus with his sister and her boyfriend to read dazibao. Shen claims that he paid the most attention to the posters that urged political as well as economic reform. Shen attended the Peking University in the fall of 1986. According to Shen, he felt proud of being a Beida student because Beida students are known for their outspokenness and for the role they played in student movements over the past century.

The second half of the book, "Movement," provides an inside view of the 1989 student movement from the beginning to the final crackdown. Shen's first involvement in the movement was putting together a news center in a Beida dormitory on April 22. He wrote that he want the broadcast station could "help the movement without being too visible." On May 3, Shen was elected as the general secretary of the official Dialogue Delegation. According to Shen, the responsibility for putting the students' demands before government leaders fell on the "Dialogue Delegation" because the student movement was about pressing the Chinese government for reforms. Shen wrote that he was determined to avoid the political fights that often went on in other student organizations' leadership. To better prepare for the meetings, Shen wrote that the "Dialogue Delegation" should make sure they had a clear agenda to present to the government officials before they actually went to the dialogue meetings. His friend suggested that they should divide the substance of the dialogue into three parts. On May 8, the Beida Preparatory Committee posted a dazibao stating five conditions that the authorities should meet before the students would return to class. Shen claims that he agreed with the demands but worried that this action might create problems for the "Dialogue Delegation" because Shen hoped different student groups would speak with a united voice.

Despite Shen's effort to organize the "Dialogue Delegation", their attempt to achieve a genuine dialogue with the government failed because the chaotic atmosphere of the meeting prevented them from producing any meaningful negotiations. On May 10, Shen wrote that he was excited about the news that Yan Mingfu had expressed an interest in holding a dialogue with the students. At the same time, he was nervous for the big meeting. The first meeting with Yan Mingfu, the head of the Secretariat of the Chinese Communist Party Central Committee and the minister of the United Front Department, came on May 13. Apart from six members of the "Dialogue Delegation", other student leaders such as Wuer Kaixi and Chai Ling also attended this meeting. Shen recalled that the meeting went sour when Zheng Min, a dialogue delegate from People's University, said in an emphatic tone that "the ball has been kicked to the government’s court. We are waiting to see how the government will kick the ball back." According to Shen, he believed that Zheng's comment put the students on the opposite side of the government.

Another meeting with Yan Mingfu and Li Tieying was held on May 14. Shen wrote that he wanted the representatives of hunger strikers to stay as observers. The student observers, however, sent endless notes and proposed more questions for the Delegation to raise, which forced Shen to deviate from what they had prepared. Shen claimed did not know how to regain control. Shen admitted that "I have been emotionally on edge since the dialogue had ended on May 14." Shen wrote that he missed the May 18 meeting with Li Peng, which turned out to be the last meeting with the government. Shen's friend who attended the meeting told him that "we weren't prepared. It was too disorganized. It wasn't a dialogue; the two sides were just making statements at each other." This meeting was broadcast nationwide, which was what the "Dialogue Delegation" had desperately wanted to achieve for its last two meetings. Shen realized it was impossible to have a real dialogue with the government after the failure of the previous meetings. As a result, Shen spent the following days trying to persuade the hunger strikers to leave Tiananmen Square to avoid the possible military crackdown.

At the end of the book, Shen provides a detailed portrayal of the June 4 military crackdown. Because his house was near the Tiananmen Square, he witnessed the death of many ordinary citizens. Shen escaped China with the help from a group of influential people he had met during the movement.

== Reception ==
Shen Tong's book received many positive responses. Patricia Dorff, who was the associate editor at Foreign Affairs magazine editing articles on the Middle East, Asia, and Africa, believes that after many books written by Western journalists, Almost a Revolution "provides a much needed insider's account of the events leading up to the Tiananmen Square massacre." Dorff further states that Shen Tong's book "reinforces the argument, contrary to Chinese government assertions, that the prodemocracy movement was spontaneous and unplanned."

Judy Polumbaum calls Almost a Revolution "an honest book." Polumbaum suggested that "Shen Tong is frank about his own self-centered quest for identity, understanding, and love, and his oftentimes aimless or impulsive political movements; and he is candid about the flaws and failings of the movement."

One critic of the book, Judith Shapiro, suggested that the book is "frustratingly thin on description and analysis of the movement itself." Shapiro also wrote that "unlike the engaging account of Mr. Shen's youth, the second half of the book is often tedious."

== Sources ==
- Shen, Tong (1990). Almost a Revolution. Houghton Mifflin. ISBN 978-0-395-54693-2.
