= Shaodong Guo =

Chinese-American nutrition scientist

- Born: August 10, 1968 (age 58)
- Citizenship: American
- Education: Huazhong Agricultural University, China (BS, MS); Peking University, Beijing, China (Ph.D.)
- Occupations: Nutrition scientist, academic and diabetes researcher
- Known for: Nutrient sensing and gene transcriptional regulation of blood glucose and diabetes mechanisms
- Scientific career
- Fields: Diabetes and its complication and prevention
- Workplaces: University of Illinois at Chicago; Harvard Medical School; Texas A&M University

Shaodong Guo (Chinese: 郭绍东; born on 10 August 1968) is a Chinese-American nutrition scientist, academic, and diabetes researcher. He is a professor in nutrition and medicine at the Department of Nutrition of Texas A&M University. He has been a senior editor for Journal of Endocrinology and Journal of Molecular Endocrinology.

== Biography ==
Guo graduated from Enshi high school and attended Huazhong Agricultural University in Wuhan, obtaining a bachelor's degree in agronomy and a master's degree in biochemistry in 1989. He then graduated from Peking University (PKU) in 1995 with a Ph.D. in physiology and molecular biology. Followed by a decade of high education in China, Guo went to U.S.A. in 1997, joining the University of Illinois at Chicago (UIC) and then Harvard Medical School for a decade of medical research and training. Guo was a faculty as instructor in medicine in Children's Hospital Boston and Harvard University prior to joining the faculty of Texas A&M University in 2009.

Much of Guo's research centers on insulin signaling, insulin resistance, type 2 diabetes mellitus and its complications. Following the completion of Ph.D. with his mentor Xiangyu Wu in PKU, Guo had three postdoctoral appointments. The first was at the Institute of Genetics and Developmental Biology of Chinese Academic of Sciences from 1995 to 1997 with Fangzhen Sun majored in studies of genetics and developmental biology. Next, he went to the UIC to work with Terry Unterman, M.D. in study of insulin from 1997 to 2001. He joined Harvard Medical School to work with William Aird, Victor J Dzau, and Morris F. White in studies of cardiovascular biology and diabetes mellitus from 2001 to 2008. He was hired at Texas A&M University as an assistant professor in the department of medicine in 2009 and was appointed to associate professor in 2015. In 2016, he joined the department of nutrition.

Guo has made several fundamental discoveries by identifying new pathways in the field of insulin and type 2 diabetes mellitus. These discoveries include identification of key roles of a nutritional and hormonal sensor – forkhead/winged helix transcription factor Foxo1 that mediates the action of insulin, glucagon, estrogen, bioactive functional foods, and anti-diabetic drug metformin in control of nutrient and tissue homeostasis, which has a significant impact on precision nutrition and medicine through the seminar research in diabetes and genetics. Moreover, Guo's lab has demonstrated a crucial mechanism of diabetes-induced heart failure by establishing the critical role of insulin and suppressed-Foxo1 via the insulin receptor substrate (IRS) proteins in control of cardiac structure and function. Taken together, Guo's research projects highlight the importance of nutrient sensing and hormonal signaling in the regulation of gene transcription via the Foxo1 that controls not only blood glucose but also the cardiovascular structure, function and beyond.

Guo has authored over 108 publications, has been cited more than 8,000 times, and has a Google Scholar Citation H-index of 38.

Guo was book chapter writer and editor-in-chief for the textbook Metabolic Syndrome (Springer Reference, 2016) and Nutrition and Metabolic Disease (Marsland, 2018).

== Awards and honors ==
- 2007 - Junior Faculty Award, American Diabetes Association
- 2015 - Career Development Award, American Diabetes Association
- 2015 - Research Excellence Thomas R Lee Award, American Diabetes Association
- 2020 - Distinguished Reviewer Award, American Diabetes Association
- 2021 - Presidential Impact Fellow of Texas A&M University
