= The Pacific Review =

The Pacific Review may refer to:

- The Pacific Review (Routledge journal), an international relations journal published by Routledge
- The Pacific Review (San Diego State University journal), a undergraduate literary magazine published by San Diego State University

== See also ==
- Pacifica Review, an international relations journal published by Routledge on behalf of La Trobe University, now known as Global Change, Peace & Security
