= Mi Zhang =

Mr Mi Zhang
- Education: University of Southern California (Ph.D.); Peking University (B.S.)
- Known for: Edge AI; Artificial Intelligence of Things (AIoT); Machine Learning Systems; Mobile Health
- Scientific career
- Fields: Mobile Computing; AI; Embedded Systems; Computer Networks; Ubiquitous Computing
- Workplaces: Ohio State University; Michigan State University; Cornell University
- Website: cse.osu.edu/people/mizhang.1

Mr Mi Zhang is a computer scientist at Ohio State University, where he is an Associate Professor of Computer Science and Engineering and the director of AIoT and Machine Learning Systems Lab. He is best known for his work in Edge AI, Artificial Intelligence of Things (AIoT), machine learning systems, and mobile health.

== Biography ==
Zhang was born in Beijing, China. He received his B.S. degree in Electrical Engineering from Peking University in China. He received his M.S. degrees in both Electrical Engineering and Computer Science, and his Ph.D. degree in Computer Engineering, all from University of Southern California.

From 2013 to 2014, he was a postdoctoral associate in computing and information science at Cornell University. From 2014 to 2022, he was an assistant professor and then a tenured associate professor at Michigan State University. From 2022, he joined the Department of Computer Science and Engineering at Ohio State University as a tenured associate professor.

== Honors and awards ==
In 2016, he developed the first on-device deep learning-based pill identification algorithm on mobile devices that won the first place of the NIH Pill Image Recognition Challenge.

In 2017, he developed the memory and computation-efficient AI-based real-time noise removal and speech enhancement algorithm for smart hearing aids that won the third place of the NSF Hearables Challenge.

In 2019, he developed the model compression algorithms for enhancing the efficiency of deep learning models that won the 4th place of the CIFAR-100 track in the NeurIPS Google MicroNet Challenge.

In 2020, he won the MSU Innovation of the Year Award for his smart hearing aids invention.

In 2021, he was awarded the ACM SenSys Best Paper Award.

In 2023, he received the Inaugural USC ECE SIPI Distinguished Alumni Award in the Junior/Academia category for his contributions to mobile/edge computing in his early career.

In 2025, he was elected an ACM Distinguished Member.

Some of his other notable awards include:

- 2020 – Facebook Faculty Research Award
- 2020 – NeurIPS Workshop on Scalability, Privacy, and Security in Federated Learning Best Paper Award
- 2019 – Amazon AWS Machine Learning Research Award
- 2018 – IEEE CNS Best Paper Award
- 2016 – NSF CRII Award
- 2015 – ACM UbiComp Best Paper Award Honorable Mention

== Selected talks ==
- Empowering the Next Billion Devices with Deep Learning, Stanford University, (2021).

== Selected publications ==
- Samiul Alam, Luyang Liu, Ming Yan, and Mi Zhang. "FedRolex: Model-Heterogeneous Federated Learning with Rolling Sub-Model Extraction". Conference on Neural Information Processing Systems (NeurIPS), (2022).
- Yu Zheng, Zhi Zhang, Shen Yan, and Mi Zhang. "Deep AutoAugment". International Conference on Learning Representations (ICLR), (2022).
- Xiao Zeng, Ming Yan, and Mi Zhang. "Mercury: Efficient On-Device Distributed DNN Training via Stochastic Importance Sampling". ACM Conference on Embedded Networked Sensor Systems (SenSys), (2021).
- Chenning Li, Hanqing Guo, Shuai Tong, Xiao Zeng, Zhichao Cao, Mi Zhang, Qiben Yan, Li Xiao, Jiliang Wang, and Yunhao Liu. "NELoRa: Towards Ultra-low SNR LoRa Communication with Neural-enhanced Demodulation". ACM Conference on Embedded Networked Sensor Systems (SenSys), (2021).
- Shen Yan, Kaiqiang Song, Fei Liu, and Mi Zhang. "CATE: Computation-aware Neural Architecture Encoding with Transformers". International Conference on Machine Learning (ICML), (2021).
- Shen Yan, Yu Zheng, Wei Ao, Xiao Zeng, and Mi Zhang. "Does Unsupervised Architecture Representation Learning Help Neural Architecture Search?". Conference on Neural Information Processing Systems (NeurIPS), (2020).
- Chaoyang He, Songze Li, Jinhyun So, Xiao Zeng, Mi Zhang, Hongyi Wang, Xiaoyang Wang, Praneeth Vepakomma, Abhishek Singh, Hang Qiu, Li Shen, Peilin Zhao, Yan Kang, Yang Liu, Ramesh Raskar, Qiang Yang, Murali Annavaram, Salman Avestimehr. "FedML: A Research Library and Benchmark for Federated Machine Learning". Conference on Neural Information Processing Systems (NeurIPS) Federated Learning Workshop, (2020).
- Xiao Zeng, Biyi Fang, Haichen Shen, and Mi Zhang. "Distream: Scaling Live Video Analytics with Workload-Adaptive Distributed Edge Intelligence". ACM Conference on Embedded Networked Sensor Systems (SenSys), (2020).
- Biyi Fang, Xiao Zeng, and Mi Zhang. "NestDNN: Resource-Aware Multi-Tenant On-Device Deep Learning for Continuous Mobile Vision". ACM International Conference on Mobile Computing and Networking (MobiCom), (2018).
- Xiao Zeng, Kai Cao, and Mi Zhang. "MobileDeepPill: A Small-Footprint Mobile Deep Learning System for Recognizing Unconstrained Pill Images". ACM International Conference on Mobile Systems, Applications, and Services (MobiSys), (2017).
- Biyi Fang, Jillian Co, and Mi Zhang. "DeepASL: Enabling Ubiquitous and Non-Intrusive Word and Sentence-Level Sign Language Translation". ACM Conference on Embedded Networked Sensor Systems (SenSys), (2017).
- David C. Mohr, Mi Zhang, and Stephen M. Schueller. "Personal Sensing: Understanding Mental Health Using Ubiquitous Sensors and Machine Learning". Annual Review of Clinical Psychology (ARCP), Volume 13, Pages 23-47, (2017).
- Biyi Fang, Nicholas D. Lane, Mi Zhang, Aidan Boran, and Fahim Kawsar.. "BodyScan: Enabling Radio-based Sensing on Wearable Devices for Contactless Activity and Vital Sign Monitoring". ACM International Conference on Mobile Systems, Applications, and Services (MobiSys), (2016).
- Sohrob Saeb, Mi Zhang, Christopher J. Karr, Stephen M. Schueller, Marya E. Corden, Konrad P. Kording, and David C. Mohr. "Mobile Phone Sensor Correlates of Depressive Symptom Severity in Daily-Life Behavior: An Exploratory Study". Journal of Medical Internet Research (JMIR), Volume 17, Issue 7, Pages e175, (2022).
