= Vera Schwarcz =

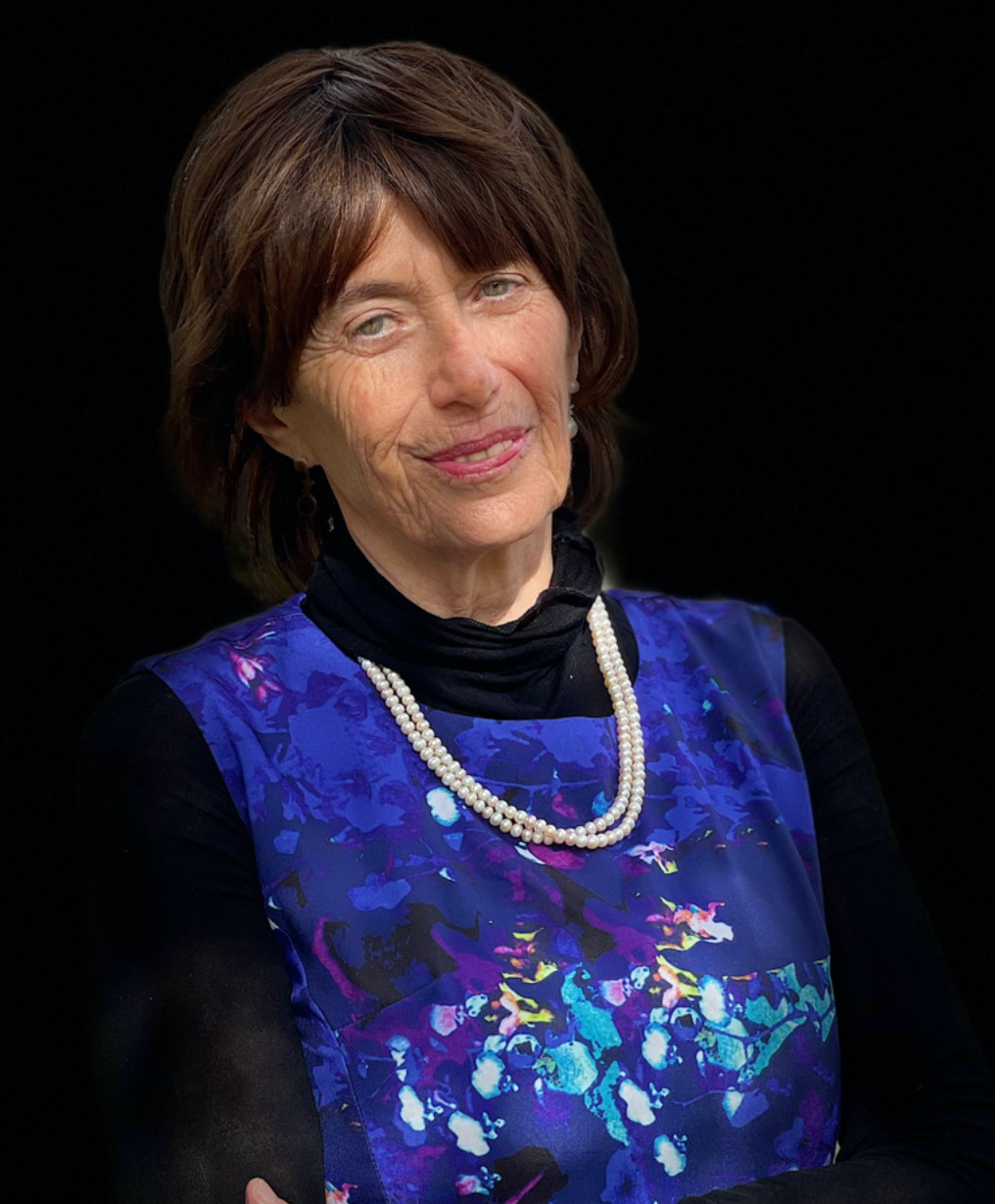
- Born: May 8, 1947 (age 79); Romania
- Occupations: Author, Professor

Academic background
- Education: Vassar College, AB; Yale University, MA; Wesleyan University, MAA; Stanford University, PhD

Academic work
- Discipline: Chinese history
- Institutions: Wesleyan University

Vera Schwarcz (born May 8, 1947) (Chinese: 舒衡哲) is an American historian, who was the Freeman Professor of East Asian Studies at Wesleyan University. Her A.B. was from Vassar College, with a M.A. from Yale, where she studied with Jonathan Spence, a M.A.A. from Wesleyan University and a Ph.D. from Stanford University. From 1979 to 1980, she studied at Peking University as part the first group of American students admitted after the establishment of diplomatic relations between the U.S. and China. In addition to works of history, Schwarcz writes poetry.

== Biography ==
Born in Romania, Schwarcz has taught Chinese history at Stanford University, Wesleyan University, as well as at Hebrew University in Jerusalem, Beijing University and Centre Chine in Paris. She served as Director of the Freeman Center for East Asian Studies and Chair of the East Asian Studies Program at Wesleyan. She is the author of eight books, including the prize-winning Bridge Across Broken Time: Chinese and Jewish Cultural Memory (Yale University Press, 1999) as well as Time for Telling Truth Is Running Out: Conversations with Zhang Shenfu (Yale, 1986); The Chinese Enlightenment (Berkeley, 1984), and Place and Memory in Singing Crane Garden (University of Pennsylvania Press, 2008). She is also the author of numerous books of poetry including A Scoop of Light and In The Garden of Memory—a collaboration with the Prague-born Israeli artist Chava Pressburger, and Ancestral Intelligence.

Her 2008 book Place and Memory in the Singing Crane Garden centers on the problem of truth in comparative history:

The Singing Crane Garden in northwest Beijing has a history dense with classical artistic vision, educational experimentation, political struggle, and tragic suffering. Built by the Manchu prince Mianyu in the mid-nineteenth century, the garden was intended to serve as a refuge from the clutter of daily life near the Forbidden City. In 1860, during the Anglo-French war in China, the garden was destroyed. One hundred years later, in the 1960s, the garden served as the "oxpens," where dissident university professors were imprisoned during the Cultural Revolution. Peaceful Western involvement began in 1986, when ground was broken for the Arthur Sackler Museum of Art and Archaeology. Completed in 1993, the Museum and the Jillian Sackler Sculpture Garden stand on the same grounds today.

Her book, Ancestral Intelligence (2013) is a collection of poems written as though rendered by dissident poet Chen Yinke. Like his, her poems show a degradation of culture and humanity, in this case through comparison of classic and modern Chinese logographs.

== Selected works ==
Her books include:

- Schwarcz, Vera (2013). Ancestral Intelligence. Antrim House. ISBN 978-1-936482-49-8
- Schwarcz, Vera (2009). Bring Rest in the Garden of Flourishing Grace. CT: Red Heffin Press.
- Schwarcz, Vera (2009). Chisel of Remembrance. Antrim House. ISBN 978-0-9817883-2-6.
- Schwarcz, Vera (2008). Place and Memory in the Singing Crane Garden. Philadelphia: University of Pennsylvania Press. ISBN 978-0-8122-4100-6.
- Truth is Woven (Premier Poets Chapbook Series, 2005)
- Schwarcz, Vera (2004). In the Garden of Memory. City: March Street Pr. ISBN 978-0-9745909-3-6.
- Schwarcz, Vera (2000). Scoop of Light. City: March Street Pr. ISBN 978-1-882983-51-3.
- Fresh Words for a Jaded World - and selected poems (Blue Feather Press, Co., 2000)
- Schwarcz, Vera (1998). Bridge across Broken Time. New Haven: Yale University Press. ISBN 978-0-300-06614-2.
- Schwarcz, Vera (1992). Time for Telling Truth Is Running out. New Haven: Yale University Press. ISBN 978-0-300-05009-7.
- Schwarcz, Vera (1986). The Chinese Enlightenment. Berkeley: University of California Press. ISBN 978-0-520-05027-3.
- Schwarcz, Vera (1984). Long Road Home. New Haven: Yale University Press. ISBN 978-0-300-03009-9.

Her articles include:

- "The Art of Poetry, Part II, poetrysky.com (July 2007)
- "Truth and History: The Chinese Mirror," History and Theory, Volume 46; Number 2 (2007) pp. 281–291
- "Travels in China," Binah (March 19, 2007) pp. 18–25
- "The Art of Poetry Part I, A Conversation with Yidan Han," poetrysky.com (January 2007)
- "Jiu ji mang mang" (Blurred and boundless traces from the past – historical trauma in the work of the Manchu Prince Yihuan) in Bijiao wenxhe yu shijie wenxhe (Comparative Literature and World Literature) Beijing University Press, (2005) pp. 154–167
- "Wu si liang dai zhi shi Jen zi" (Two generations of May Fourth intellectuals) in Xi Jilin, editor 20 Shi Dai Zhong quo zhi shi Jen zi liang (Essays on 20th Century Intellectual History) (Shang hai, 2005)
- "Zamen you zhiyin" (A Wordless Connection) in Chen Lai, ed. Bu Xi Ji: Huiyi Zhang Dainian Xiansheng (Unbroken Threads: Essays in Memory of Professor Zhang Dainian). Beijing, 2005. pp. 340 – 346.
- "Historical Memory and Personal Identity," B'or Ha'Torah No 15. (2005) pp. 56 – 60
- "Through and Against the Tide of History: Zhu Guanqian and the Legacy of May Fourth," China Studies, No. 5 (1999)
- "Garden and Museum: Shadows of Memory at Peking University," East Asian History 17/18 (1999)
- "The Burden of Memory: The Cultural Revolution and the Holocaust," China Information (Summer 1996)
- "The Pane of Sorrow: Public Uses of Personal Grief in Modem China," Daedalus (Winter, 1996)
- "Di er ci shi Jie da zhan: zai bo wu guan de guang zhao zhi wai (World War II: Beyond the Museum Lights) in Dong Fang (The Orient)" Vol. 5 (1995)
- "Chinese History, Jewish Memory": Shapes of Memory, ed. Geoffrey Hartman (London: Basil Blackwell Ltd., 1994)
- "No Solace from Lethe," in The Living Tree: The Changing Meaning of Being Chinese Today, edited by Tu Weiming (Stanford: Stanford University Press, 1994)
- "Amnesie historique dans la Chine du XX e siecle," Genre Humain, special issue, "Politiques de L'Oubli," No. 18 (Paris, 1988)
