= C. S. Kiang =

C.S. Kiang (Chinese: 江家驷) has served as Chairman of the Peking University Environment Fund and the Founding Dean of the College of Environmental Sciences at Peking University between 2002 and 2006. His vision is to set up the basic infrastructure for the development of leadership in sustainable development, exploring the world impact of what China can do for the world in the 21st century.

Trained in physics at National Taiwan University and Georgia Institute of Technology, after four years at the National Center for Atmospheric Research, Kiang returned to Georgia Tech in 1978 to develop the Atmospheric Sciences program within the School of Geophysical Sciences and then served as Director of the School from 1981 to 1988. He is founding Director of the Southern Oxidant Study (1988–present), a strategic alliance of government agencies, national laboratories, academic institutes and private industries to study the air quality of the southern region of the US.

He has served as member of the National Academy of Sciences' Panel for the Study of Global Climate Change in China, and member of the National Academy of Sciences of Review of US Air Quality Management, Chairman of the International Conference on Global and Regional Environmental Atmospheric Chemistry in Beijing, and member of the Steering Committee of the Global Water Partnership, member of the Advisory Board of the newly established Environmental Research Letters and Climate Prosperity Alliance.

Currently, he is the CEO of Sustainable Development Technologies and Vice Chairman of Global Urban Development. He is a Councillor of the World Future Council, a member of Advisory Board of the Climate Change Capital, a member of International Council of Asia Society and a member of the Global Agenda Council of Climate Change of the World Economic Forum and an advisor of the Global Elders and other various roles in Non-profit Partners Entrepreneurships and consultation service for private corporations. In 2012, he spoke at The Wall Street Journal's ECO:nomics conference where he quoted as saying "China has spent 30 years on so-called economic reforms and made significant progress. The first issue was to get people to survive. Then you try to deal with the environment. Why is this a good time? Many cities in China have air-quality problems, many have water issues. The problem is severe, and gets the attention of the older people. Because of the economic benefits, they've started to look at the quality of life. The No. 1 thing they care about is their health and the environment. So it's time".
