= VFinity =

Software company

VFinity, Inc.
- Company type: Private
- Industry: Audio/Video, Enterprise Software, Professional Services
- Founded: 2000
- Headquarters: New York City, New York, USA
- Key people: Shen Tong Joe Peyronnin
- Products: Software
- Parent: Wan Net Technology, Ltd.

VFinity was a privately held software company based in New York City. It was founded in 2000 as a consulting and software customization company Wan Net Technology by former Chinese democracy leader Shen Tong, and became VFinity in 2004.

VFinity sold web-based enterprise systems for digital asset management. Its products were used by broadcasters, archives, educational and financial institutions in the United States and Asia to manage their multimedia assets. The VFinity platform was soft-launched during National Association of Broadcasters (NAB) 2006, which won recognition that launched its president Shen Tong into a Keynote Speech at NAB Super Session the following year. Independent research reports had also followed VFinity's attempted entry into various markets by Frost & Sullivan Hot Company Watch List in 2007, ABI key players in World Digital Asset Management Markets in 2008, and Forrester Rich Media Management Software 2010.

According to these research and other trade publications in higher education, information technology, archive and library science, broadcast technology, digital asset management among others, VFinity main value propositions and differentiation from other traditional DAM vendors are its Web2.0 approach to architecture, metadata, and user experiences. VFinity and Shen Tong promoted notions of "Context is King", search centric extreme ease of use with zero user training, folksonomy (or free tagging) combined with taxonomy (expert tagging), zero client (or Web client). VFinity platform seems to differ from traditional enterprise software especially in professional media industry in its Webby approach.

VFinity clients included cultural institutions, production and advertisement companies, film archives, national archives, and broadcasters: TriBeCa Film Festival, Beijing Olympics, Cathay Financials, National Taiwan University, Brandeis University, a PBS station producing prime time programming, Bloomberg L.P.
