= Shen Tong =

Chinese American impact investor, activist, and writer

- 沈彤
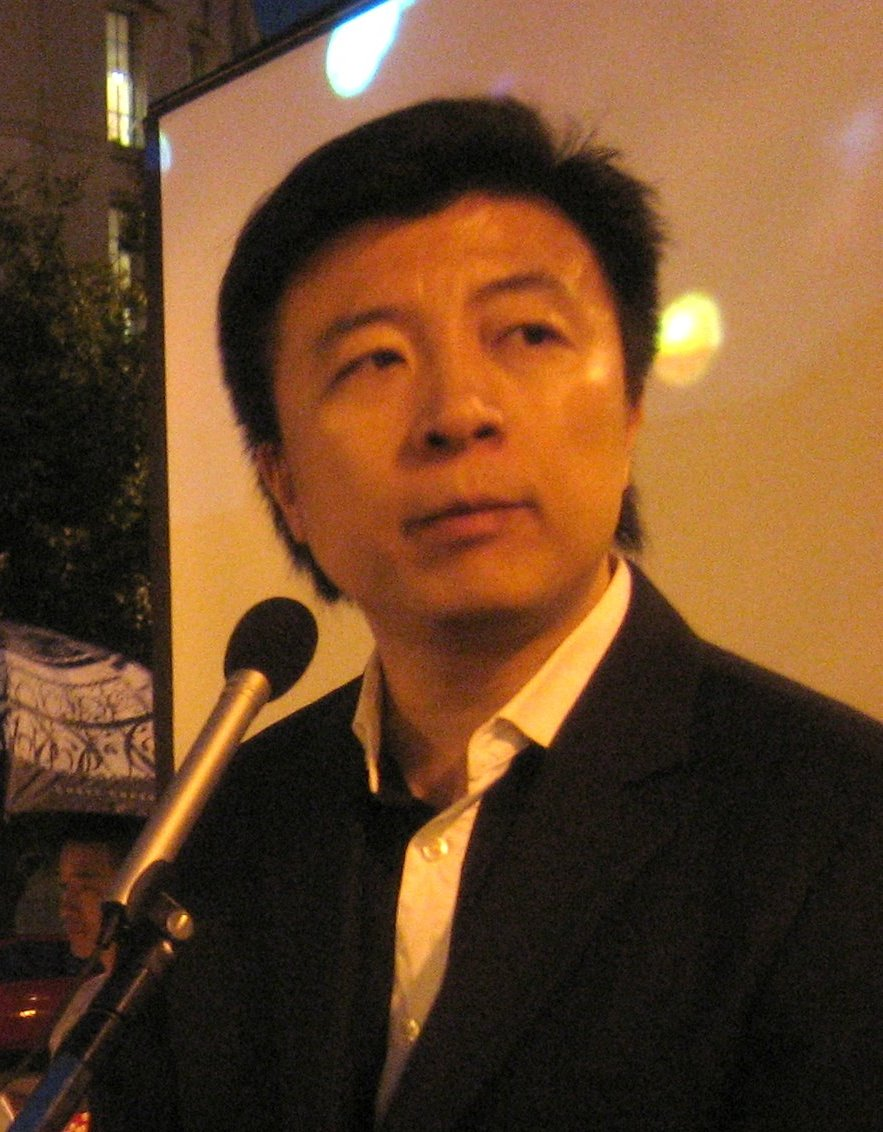
- Shen Tong in Washington, D.C.
- Born: 1968 (age 57–58); Beijing, China
- Citizenship: United States
- Education: Peking University (BA); Brandeis University (BS); Harvard University; Boston University (PhD)
- Occupations: holistic health advocate, impact Investor, activist, author, philanthropist
- Title: Founder of TheFutureCo; Managing Partner of FoodFutureCo; Founder of Food-X
- Movement: Regenerative Agriculture, Healthy Food, Contemplative Practice, Human Rights
- Website: www.shentong.co

Shen Tong (沈彤 born 1968) is a scientist turned American contemplative practitioner, holistic health advocate, and Dharma teacher, whose work spans impact investing, movement building, public speaking, and writing. He founded the accelerators TheFutureCo (2023), FoodFutureCo (2015) and Food-X (2014), which was recognized by Fast Company. As a student leader of the 1989 Tiananmen Square democracy movement, he was named one of Newsweek's People of the Year in 1989, and went into exile in the United States, where he published his autobiography, Almost a Revolution, in 1990. He became a media, software, social entrepreneur, and impact investor in the late 1990s. He serves on multiple boards and advisory.

== Contemplative practice and Dharma teaching ==
Shen's appearances at United Nations and climate gatherings span three decades. In 2018 he spoke on sustainable food at Paris Climate Week, and in 2026 he led "The Energetics of Moving Capital" at the Transformative Wealth ClimateWeekNYC Gathering, held during Climate Week NYC and the United Nations General Assembly. In May 1993, UN Secretary-General Boutros Boutros-Ghali, after objections from China, barred a press conference with Shen inside UN headquarters, and Shen spoke on the sidewalk outside instead.

He speaks on meditation, consciousness and holistic health, including a 2024 talk at Summit at Sea on biophotons, light embodiment and meditative practice. In November 2025 he was a guest speaker at the Wonder Summit, an expedition to Antarctica on mental health and consciousness, whose organizers described his mission as driving "scalable, high-impact innovation in health, longevity, and regenerative living, aligned with nature's intelligence". and a May 2026 interview on the podcast Aware with Seb about collective awakening, human energetics and the "lightbody".

Through the Dharma Fund and the NowIsTheFuture Foundation, companion entities to TheFutureCo, Shen applies contemplative and dharmic principles to investment. In November 2025, under a partnership between TheFutureCo and DHI - Bhutan's sovereign fund and holding company Druk Holding and Investments, an international investor delegation visited Bhutan, and the partners launched the Dharma Fund as the global investment channel for the Mindfulness City Innovation Fund. He writes on consciousness, integrated epistemology and embodied knowing at shentong.co, including frameworks he calls Life's Zero Point, the Sacred Third and Photon Path 57.

Shen's field holding and public work began in the 1989 democracy movement, whose protests spread from Beijing to cities across China. He recounted his role in the movement in Almost a Revolution. After leaving China, he gave one of the first detailed eyewitness accounts of the crackdown at a press conference in Newton, Massachusetts, on June 30, 1989. In June 1996 he spoke at the Tibetan Freedom Concert at the Polo Fields of Golden Gate Park, San Francisco, alongside Buddhist scholar Robert Thurman. In 2007 he gave a keynote on social media at a super session of the National Association of Broadcasters in Las Vegas. In 2011 he supported the Occupy Wall Street movement; The Wall Street Journal described him as its "unlikely father figure", and Fast Company called him the movement's "philosopher-in-residence".

== Career ==
=== Social entrepreneurship ===
Shen Tong is a serial entrepreneur since 1990s and impact investor with more than a couple of hundred investments in health wellness & consciousness (HWC), regenerative agriculture, healthy food, media, education, Web3, community, and deep tech ventures. After moving to New York City from Massachusetts in 2000, he focused on business ventures with impact and purpose focusing on consciousness. He has several dozen publicly known commercial and impact investments. Collaborating with renowned figures such as Dan Barber, Dorothy Cann Hamilton, Michael Moss, and Michel Nischan, he founded Food-X in 2014, a startup accelerator that supported businesses with a positive impact on the food sector, running 11 cohorts until it ceased operations in 2020. In 2015, Shen also founded and served as the managing partner of FoodFutureCo, another business accelerator and impact investment firm which focuses on scale-up stage food, agriculture, social, and environmental entrepreneurship; followed by TheFutureCo (TFC) which expand into Web3 in 2021, and HWC in 2023.

Shen's portfolio of good food and sustainable agriculture holdings includes over 100 investments in dozens of impact companies and not-for-profit organizations. His other social entrepreneurship portfolio includes companies such as WeFunder. His thesis of elevating individual and collective consciousness, cultivating tasty, sustainable, healthy, accessible, and affordable food and agriculture businesses is explained in his TEDx Talk in addition to numerous speeches at Fancy Food Show, Esca Bona, Vitagora, Concordia, James Beard Foundation, Food Tank, Seed to Chips, Harvard Business School, BevNet, etc. The companies Shen has founded or co-founded have had numerous financial exits including VFinity, DCF, B&B Media, and GA Media. Two other financial exits came from his venture investments. He works with social entrepreneurs to build financially sustainable and impactful businesses.

In 2021, Shen became the advisor and mentor of the Vietnamese studio Sky Mavis for Axie Infinity, a Pokémon-inspired non-fungible token-based online video game where anyone can earn tokens through skilled gameplay and contributions to the ecosystem. The early unique aspect of Axie Infinity is the space that created called "Play to Earn". All art assets and Axie genetic data are also readily available to third parties, enabling community to create diverse experiences within the Axie Infinity universe. Shen's Web3FutureCo made other Web3 and Blockchain investments with activities in the Philippines and the US.

=== Media ventures ===
Shen was the founder and president of the now defunct VFinity, company which made software tools and web applications for multimedia and multilingual search, media production, archiving, and media distribution. The founding idea was based on two patents. He is known for his promotion of "Context Media" partially due to his keynote speech at a super session of National Association of Broadcasters in Las Vegas, 2007. He founded the TV production company B&B Media Production and invested in bookstores and publishing in Beijing. B&B Media Production had created and produced several highly circulated and acclaimed TV programs, including the national weekend primetime show Tell It Like It Is during its first season.

== Humanitarian, political, and social activism ==
=== Student activism ===
Shen co-chaired the committee on dialogue with the government during the 1989 pro-democracy movement in China. He was on Changan Avenue when Chinese troops opened fire on the students. He had earlier obtained a Chinese passport to study biology at Brandeis University in the United States, so even though he was wanted by the Chinese government he was able to board a plane six days after the massacre on June 4, 1989. He was able to walk undisguised through police and security officials in the Beijing airport, possibly indicating broader support for the student democracy movement than the Chinese government contended at the time. Some of the biographical works about Shen Tong are Tiananmen Exiles and Standoff at Tiananmen.

=== Chinese democracy advocacy in the United States ===
Shortly after his arrival in the United States, Shen held a press conference at the Walker Center for Ecumenical Exchange in Newton, Massachusetts, giving the first detailed eye-witness account by a student leader of the Tiananmen Square massacre and of the events that led up to it.

During his studies in Massachusetts, he founded the Democracy for China Fund to support democratic movements in China and to promote ideas of political freedom and human rights. Shen Tong also helped established Radio Free Asia with bipartisan efforts led by then Senator Joe Biden in the 1990s. American NGO activist Marshall Strauss and program coordinator Juanita Scheyett-Cheng helped Shen found and operate the Fund. Coretta Scott King, John Kerry, Jeane Kirkpatrick, Nancy Pelosi, Kerry Kennedy, among other Western political and NGO figures and sinologists, were associated with Shen's organization in the 1990s. The Congressional Human Rights Delegation to China in 1991 headed by Nancy Pelosi and Republican congressman John R. Miller was organized by the Democracy for China Fund with the help and funding from Hong Kong Democrats. His 1992 trip back to China led to his and his associates' arrest. He was released and immediately exiled after two months of imprisonment under mounting international pressure, particularly from the US Congress, the Presidential Campaign of Bill Clinton, the Vatican, and European governments. In May 1993, days before the renewal of China's Most Favored Nation trading status by the US government, Shen was scheduled to give a speech at the United Nations press club, but was barred by UN Secretary-General Boutros Boutros-Ghali due to strong protest from the Chinese government. He is known to be also associated with Chinese dissident activists and writers Liu Xiaobo, Wu'er Kaixi, Hu Ping, Ma Jian, Shi Tao, the Tibetan exile leader Dalai Lama, and the Taiwanese politician Ma Yingjiu. He is one of the narrators of the 2019 documentary Tiananmen: The People Versus the Party by PBS, BBC, and continental European TV networks. The documentary is a 2-hour show special about 1989 Tiananmen Square protests and massacre, "uncover[ing] the true story of the seven-week period that changed China forever".

=== Occupy Wall Street ===
In 2011, Shen supported the Occupy Wall Street movement. He is considered a main proponent of nonviolence, social media movement, nationally coordinated organization working with broad alliances, and strategic messaging. Believing in the power of a decentralized movement to combat the social and economic injustices that contribute to a dysfunctional democracy, he held planning meetings with protesters in his Broadway office.

=== COVID-19 relief efforts ===
When the COVID-19 pandemic reached New York, The New York Times reported Shen's "just-in-time" relief efforts during the first weeks of the pandemic outbreak in New York through his private networks in March 2020.

== Cultural activities ==
External videos
- Booknotes interview with Shen Tong on Almost a Revolution, December 16, 1990, C-SPAN

=== Civil society ===
Shen served on the board of two non-profit organizations: Food Tank since 2015 and Poets & Writers from 2008 to 2014. Shen also founded a higher education and culture-focused NGO in the mid-1990s: a center in Budapest for liberal scholars, journalists, writers, and educators studying transitional society with funding from Open Society Institute and Central European University of George Soros, as well as a literature review magazine with Chinese dissident poets and writers with support from Allen Ginsberg, Susan Sontag, and Elie Wiesel.

Shen Tong is on Omnicom's sparks&honey Influencer Advisory Board, in addition to serving on boards and advisory boards for The Good Food Institute and being a member of NEXUS Global Summit. He also served as a venture partner of SOSV, a global multi-stage venture capital fund, after acting as general partner.

=== Media engagements ===
In films and television, Shen has been an actor, producer, and film festival sponsor and speaker (including Tribeca Film Festival). Shen appeared in the 2022 documentary The Exiles, a documentary film which tracked down three exiled dissidents from the Tiananmen Square massacre. It won the Grand Jury Prize in Sundance 2022. Shen also appeared as one of the main subjects in PBS Documentary Tiananmen: The People Versus the Party in 2019. He also starred in Out of Exile with co-star Sharif Atkins in 2000.

He worked with Arte, ABC News and Jean-François Bizot's Actuel magazine to produce Clandestins en Chine, including interviews with Jane Birkin, which premiered in a Paris theater and on Arte in 1992. He co-starred with actress Hu Zongwen in a made-for-TV two parts movie, which received the 6th Fei Tian National Award in 1986.

Shen's work has been profiled by major media around the world in several languages by The New York Times, The Wall Street Journal, The Washington Post, ABC, CNN, BBC, CBS, NHK, TVB, The Guardian, Le Monde, Fortune, among others.

=== Literature ===
As a writer, Shen co-authored the book Almost a Revolution, published in 1990, a memoir of his life growing up in China and his experiences at the Tiananmen Square democracy movement. He carried on a diverse writing career with political commentary, scholarly essays, film critics, literary prose, and movie scripts in English and in Chinese, including publications in China under the pseudonym Rong Di.

=== Honorary degrees ===
He holds an honorary Ph.D. in 1991 from St. Ambrose University.

== Early life and education ==
Shen Tong was born in 1968, in Beijing. He studied biology at Peking University (Beida 北大), from 1986 to 1989. Having witnessed the brutal crackdown of protestors in the avenue leading to Tiananmen Square, he said that it accidentally made him one of the key student leaders during the 1989 Tiananmen Square protests and massacre.

Upon fleeing China for the United States, Shen transferred to Brandeis University in Waltham, Massachusetts on a Wien International Scholarship, where he finished a Bachelor of Science degree in botany and genetics in 1991. After graduating from Brandeis, Shen enrolled to the PhD programs in philosophy at Harvard University, and in sociology at Boston University, studying with mentors such as Harvey Mansfield, Peter Berger, Daniel Bell, Samuel P. Huntington, and Michael Sandel.

== Personal life ==
He lives in Boston, Mass, New York City, Austin, Texas along with his three children. His father and sister Shen Qing both went to Peking University, and his mother is a medical doctor.

Shen Tong (Simplified Chinese: 沈彤; Hanyu Pinyin: Shěn Tóng; born 1968)
