= World Education Games =

- Logo of World Education Games
- Genre: International Event for Students around the Globe
- Frequency: Biennial
- Location: Worldwide
- Inaugurated: 6 - 8 March 2012
- Most recent: October 2015
- Next event: March 2018
- Participants: Open to any student 4-18 years
- Attendance: 5,960,862 students from 240 Countries
- Patron: Microsoft UNICEF 3P Learning Macquarie Group
- Organiser: 3P Learning
- Website: worldeducationgames.com

The World Education Games is a global online event for all schools and students around the world and is held semi annually during the month of October. It is the expanded format of what was once known as World Maths Day but it now includes World Literacy Day and World Science Day too. It is organized by the 3PLearning and sponsored by Microsoft, UNICEF, 3P Learning and MACQUARIE. The World Maths Day holds the 'Guinness World Record' for the Largest Online Maths Competition in 2010. Its Global Ambassador is 'Scott Flansburg' aka the Human Calculator.

Its inception with the expanded format was in 2012 when 5,960,862 students from 240 countries and territories around the world competed with each other. In 2013, it was held March 5–7.

The World Education Games had taken place October 13 through 15, 2015, where over 6 Million students joined worldwide from over 20,000 schools in 159 countries and raised over $100,000 which will help send 33,000 students to school.

== History ==
The World Education Games is a major free online educational competition-style event, hosted by the global e-learning provider 3P Learning (creators of subscription-based e-learning platforms designed primarily for schools—such as Mathletics, Spellodrome and IntoScience).

The World Education Games had its origins purely as a mathematics-based event, then known as World Maths Day in 2007. The event was powered by 3P Learning's flagship online learning resource, Mathletics.

In 2011, the event expanded to include a second subject (World Spelling Day, renamed World Literacy Day in 2013), followed a year later by a third subject (World Science Day) and at which point the event took on the fully encompassing World Education Games name and branding.

Since 2012 The World Education Games has been collaborating with UNICEF in the framework of a program called "School in a Box" that supports the development of education in regions that are affected by various disasters and poverty.

== Rules ==
Participation in the games is open to all students from any country and is free. Registration is required and an access to the internet is a must. Students are matched according to their age and grade levels or abilities if such is requested by their teachers. Students play randomly against other students from all over the world. Students answer as many questions as possible during the allotted time for each game.

Correct answers get points, wrong answers no points and three wrong answers end the game prematurely. Each student plays and scored for the points accumulated during the first 20 games only.

Results are announced after counting all the points and after the organizers had communicated with the parents/ teachers of possible winners and ensured that they had participated in the Games under their own registered accounts. Multiple registrations and/ or playing under someone's else account is a violation punishable by annulling the results of everyone involved. Winners are the students who score the highest points in their grade level in each competition separately and in total.

Schools are also awarded for receiving the highest point-average in each grade level as long as at least 10 students had participated from that school.

Top 100 participants also get their achievements listed on the Hall of Fame.

== World Education Games Ambassadors ==
Students who win their regional lead-up events in their countries are hand-picked to become ambassadors.

No.	Ambassador	Country
1	Alexander Y	United Kingdom
2	Alexandra B	Australia
3	Amy M	United Kingdom
4	Anna A	Russia
5	Creedon C	Canada
6	Ellie E	United Kingdom
7	Emmanuel M	Mexico
8	Fatima Y	Pakistan
9	Geoffrey M	Canada
10	Gerania R	United States
11	Hui Qing L	United Kingdom
12	Imaan C	United Kingdom
13	Kalliopi C	Australia
14	Luke W	United States
15	Maathangi A	United Arab Emirates
16	Meeral N	Pakistan
17	Melina S	United States
18	Michael Murray	United States
19	Musaab H	Canada
20	Steve Jobs	United Kingdom
21	Peyton H	Canada
22	Remi L	Australia
23	Mariam K	Australia
24	Samuel O	Nigeria
25	Thomas	United Kingdom
26	Tristan G	Australia
27	Ursula H	Australia
28	Vikayra G	South Africa

== Prizes ==
=== Platinum Prizes ===
- A glittering award ceremony to celebrate the winners will be held in November 2015 at the Sydney Opera House.
- The student with the highest total World Education Games score (in each of the age categories) will be invited to attend the award ceremony to receive their medal.
- Winning students will be flown to Sydney, Australia, along with one parent, to attend the ceremony. The trip includes flights, accommodation and a VIP Sydney tour.

=== Trophies ===
- Trophies will be awarded to the top scoring school in each of the three World Education Games events.
- Trophies will be awarded across each of the ten year/grade categories.
- Trophies will be specially engraved with the details of the winning schools.

=== Medals ===
- Medals will be awarded to the Top Scoring Students in each of the three World Education Games events.
- Medals will be awarded across each of the ten year/grade categories.
- Students finishing in first, second and third place in each of the age categories will receive a gold, silver or bronze medal.
- Medals will be specially engraved with the details of the winning students.

The winners of each group are awarded a 'minted gold medal' and the top ten in each group receive 'gold medals'. There are also various other prizes including trophies and certificates. A full list of winners including top ten in each category is available at the official website of World Education Games.

The complete list of various prizes and cups over the years can be found in the official website of World Education Games

== Winners by countries ==
	Literacy	Maths	Science	WEG
2015	Pending	Pending	Pending	Pending
2014	No Games	No Games	No Games	No Games
2013	Malaysia	Turkey	Malaysia	Malaysia
2012	United Kingdom	Australia	Malaysia	United Kingdom

== Winners by names ==
	4-7 yrs	8-10 yrs	11-13 yrs	14-18 yrs
2015	Pending	Pending	Pending	Pending
2014	No Games	No Games	No Games	No Games
2013	Sandali Rajapakse Salcombe Prep School, UK	Vihangi Rajapakse Salcombe Prep School, UK	Sachin Kumar Mital Canadian International School, Hong Kong & Shoaib hassan Beaconhouse School System, Mandi, Bahauddin, Pakistan	Danial bin Muhammad Syafiq Cempaka Schools, CH, Malaysia
2012	Sandali Rajapakse Salcombe Prep School, UK	Oliver Papillo Balwyn Primary School, Australia	Sharan Maiya The Glasgow Academy, UK	Malayandi P Cempaka Schools DH, Malaysia

== Winners of individual events ==
	World Literacy Day	World Maths Day	World Science Day
2015	11-13 yrs: Sydny Lum Shen Li	11-13 yrs: Sydny Lum Shen Li	11-13 yrs: Sydny Lum Shen Li
2014	No Games	No Games	No Games
2013	4-7 yrs: Sandali Rajapakse, Salcombe Prep School, UK 8-10 yrs: Alastair Gibson, Hexham Middle School, UK 11-13 yrs: Sydny Lum Shen Li 14-18 yrs: Kianna Wan, Team Canada, Canada	4-7yrs : Sandali Rajapakse, Salcombe Prep School, UK 8-10 yrs: Rohith Niranjan, Global Indian International School, Japan 11-13 yrs: Ata Cagin Kolbasi, Ata College, Izmir, Turkey 14-18 yrs: Husnain Ali Abid, FFC Grammar School, Pakistan	4-7 yrs: Sandali Rajapakse, Salcombe Prep School, UK 8-10 yrs: Chiacia Putri Effendy, Cahaya Harapan Sejahtera, Indonesia 11-13 yrs: Aryan Saju, The British Al Khubairat, UAE 14-18yrs: Danial Bin Muhammad Syafiq, Cempaka Schools CH, Malaysia
2012	4-7 yrs: Sandali Rajapakse, Salcombe Prep School, UK 8-10 yrs: Dylan.C, Linn Primary School, UK 11-13 yrs: Edryna Syfinaz Z A, Cempaka Schools DH, Malaysia 14-18 yrs: Phoebe M, Sha Tin College, Hong Kong	4-7yrs: Yousuf Mohammad, Orbit International School, Saudi Arabia 8-10 yrs: Darshan.S, Indian Public School, India 11-13 yrs: Moosa FerozeTarrar, Beaconhouse School System, Pakistan 14-18 yrs: Kaya Genc, Southport College, Australia	4-7 yrs: Ashwati. N, Christ the Sower School, UK 8-10 yrs: Derek.L, Monterey Ridge Elementary School, USA 11-13 yrs: Sharan Maiya, The Glasgow Academy, UK 14-18yrs: Malayandi P, Cempaka Schools DH, Malaysia
2011	4-7 yrs: Vihangi Rajapakse, Salcombe Prep School, UK 8-10 yrs: Dylan.C, Linn Primary School, UK 11-13 yrs: George.W, Team United Kingdom, UK 14-18 yrs: Phoebe M, Sha Tin College, Hong Kong	4-7yrs: Eric Z, Team Australia, Australia 8-10 yrs: Mason F, Team New Zealand, New Zealand 11-13 yrs: Kaya Genc, The Southport School, Australia 14-18 yrs: David Andersen, Fraser Coast Anglican College, Australia	No Games
2010	No Games	5-8yrs: Rohith Niranjan, Team Japan, Japan 9-13 yrs: Kaya Genc, The Southport School, Australia 14-18 yrs: David Andersen, Fraser Coast Anglican College, Australia	No Games
2009	No Games	5-8yrs : N.S, The Sikh International School, Thailand 9-13 yrs: Kaya Genc, The Southport School, Australia 14-18 yrs: David Andersen, Fraser Coast Anglican College, Australia	No Games
2008	No Games	All Ages: Tatiana Devendranath, Haileybury College, Australia	No Games
2007	No Games	All Ages: Stefan L, Christian Alliance P.C. Lau Memorial International School, Hong Kong	No Games

== See also ==
- Mathletics
- 3P Learning
