= Mathletics =

Mathletics may refer to:

== Education ==
=== Mathematics ===
- Mathletics (educational software), mathematics teaching software, a product of Australian company 3P Learning

== Arts and entertainment ==
=== Music ===
- "Mathletics" (Foals song)

== See also ==
- List of mathematics competitions
- Mathlete
- All pages beginning with "Mathletics"
