= Robert Fountain =

Robert Fountain may refer to:

- Robert Fountain (mental calculator), mental calculator and author
- Robert Fountain (event designer), event designer and planner
