= Alberto Coto García =

Spanish mental calculator

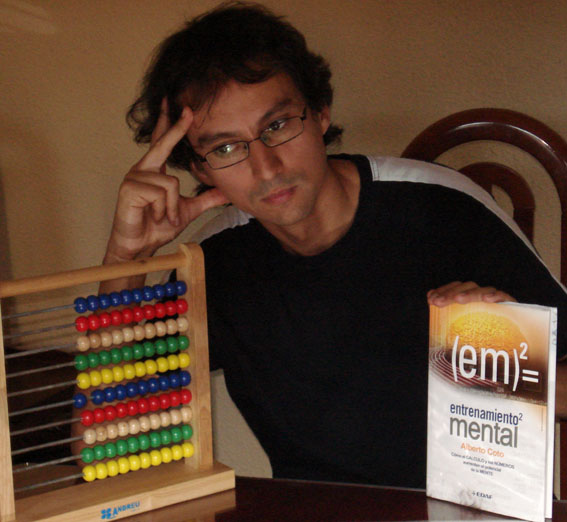
- Alberto Coto with an abacus and his book "Entrenamiento Mental" (Mental Training)
- Born: May 20, 1970 (age 56); Langreo, Spain
- Occupations: Mental calculator and writer

Alberto Coto García (born May 20, 1970) is a Spanish mental calculator. He was the world champion in mental calculation from 2008 to 2010.

Professionally he is a financial adviser and accountant. He has demonstrated his skills and has appeared on some TV shows and news. In recent years he has carried out demonstrations and conferences.

== Beginnings ==
When Alberto was six years old he demonstrated calculation skills counting the final score while playing cards. Over the years, due to his interest on calculation and brain strengthening, he has developed his capacity, becoming the fastest human calculator in the world, certificated by some Guinness Records and his titles of World Champion.

== Books ==
Alberto has written three books:

1. "La aventura del cálculo" (2003) (The adventure of calculation)
2. "Entrenamiento mental" (2006, EDAF) (Mental training)
3. "Fortalece tu mente" (2007, EDAF) (Strengthen your mind)

His books reached best seller in Spain and in Latin America.

== World Champion and records ==
Over three sessions of the Mental Calculation World Cup, Alberto Coto has always succeeded in some of the titles.

- World champion in addition: Annaberg 2004
- World champion in multiplication: Annaberg 2004
- World champion in multiplication: Giessen 2006
- World champion in addition: Leipzig 2008
- World champion in multiplication: Leipzig 2008
- World champion in mental calculation: Leipzig 2008
- Memoriad Mental Additions World Champion: Istanbul 2008
- Memoriad Mental Square Roots World Champion: Istanbul 2008
- World champion in addition: Magdeburg 2010

On July 1, 2008, Alberto Coto was proclaimed world champion in mental calculation in Leipzig (Germany) against 28 participants from 12 countries. He lost the title in Magdeburg in June 2010, to Priyanshi Somani.

Currently, he has this recognized record:

- Add 100 single-digit numbers in 19.23 seconds (Guinness record)

This record means a calculation speed of about 5 operations per second.
