= Alexis Lemaire =

French mental calculation record holder

Alexis Lemaire (born 1980) is a mental calculation world record holder. He holds a Ph.D. in Computer Science related to artificial intelligence from the University of Reims. He is also the owner of world records for mentally calculating the 13th root of 100-digit numbers and 200-digit numbers.

On 10 May 2002, he calculated the 13th root of a 100-digit number in 13.55 seconds, beating the record held by Willem Klein (88.8 seconds) and the somewhat less official record of Gert Mittring (39 seconds). On 23 November 2004, Mittring tried to beat Lemaire's record, but his time of 11.8 seconds was not counted as official, as one organization's rules had decided to stop recognizing records for root extraction of random numbers due to the difficulty of standardizing the challenge. Less than a month later (17 December 2004) Lemaire beat his own record, with a time of 3.625 seconds— this included the time it took him to read the number, calculate its root, and recount the answer.

Following this achievement, Lemaire gave up trying to improve his performance at calculating roots of 100-digit numbers, and moved on to 200-digit numbers with many attempts as described on the rules page (see 13th root). On 6 April 2005, he calculated the 13th root of a 200-digit number in 8 minutes 33 seconds. By 30 July 2007, Alexis got his time down to 77.99 seconds at the Museum of the History of Science, Oxford and by 15 November his time was further decreased to 72.4 seconds. His latest achievement came on 10 December 2007, where he mentally extracted the 13th root of a random 200-digit number in 70.2 seconds at London's Science Museum.
