= Willis Dysart =

Willis Nelson Dysart (15 March 1923, in Omega, Georgia – 8 November 2011) was an American mental calculator. His talent for arithmetic emerged at the age of three after his mother taught him to count. He quit school in the third grade (age 9) and pursued a career as a lightning calculator.

In 1938 Robert Ripley featured Dysart in his 'Believe It Or Not' newspaper column and introduced what would become Dysart's stage name – 'Willie the Wizard'.

In 1940 Dysart was recruited by a local radio station to tally votes in the US presidential election. Dysart would very quickly (much more quickly than rival radio stations aided by calculating machines) give "the exact standing of any candidate on the board, including his current total, the percentage of votes counted at that point and the probable outcome of the contest on the basis of existing information". Not content with that, Dysart would provide a little entertainment by, for instance, asking for the birth dates of the candidates and immediately giving the years, months, hours, minutes and seconds they had lived to that moment.

Dysart has given many live demonstrations of his skill at a range of venues. He has also appeared on numerous television shows, including I've Got a Secret, You Asked For It, The Art Linkletter Show and The Joe Pyne Show, which made him famous in the United States. He has also been the subject of psychological studies.

Although excelling at all kinds of arithmetic, Dysart's most startling demonstrations have been in addition and multiplication. Multiplying a pair of three-digit numbers is for Dysart a trivial task, which is why he breaks larger numbers into groups of three digits before multiplying them (many of the multiplications reported to have been made by Dysart involve six or nine-digit numbers). In this respect Dysart is unique among the documented calculators, some of whom – most notably Dutchman Wim Klein – multiplied large numbers by breaking them up into groups of two-digit numbers but never three-digit numbers. It took Dysart less than 10 seconds to multiply a pair of nine-digit numbers.

Dysart died on 8 November 2011, in Long Beach, California.
