= Lee Chung-hee =

Lee Chung-hee (이충희) may refer to:

- Lee Chung-hee (basketball)
- Lee Chung-hee (swimmer)

== See also ==
- Lee Jung-hee (disambiguation) (이정희)
