= Scott Flansburg =

American mathematician

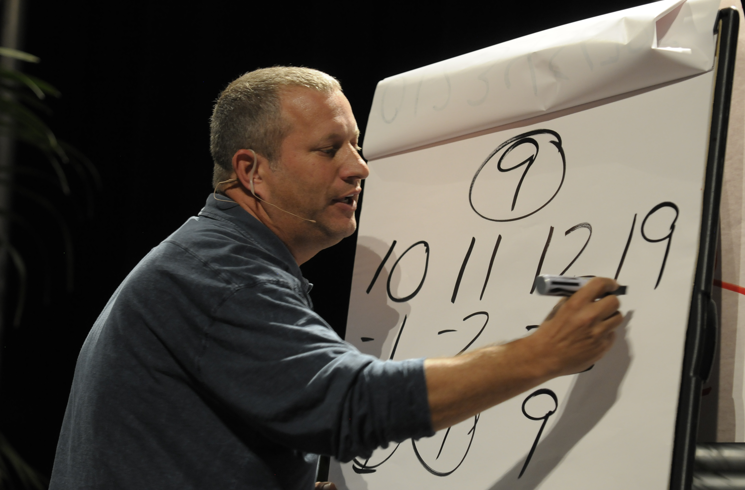
- Flansburg in 2011
- Born: December 28, 1963 (age 62); Herkimer, New York
- Occupation: Mental calculator
- Writing career
- Pen name: The Human Calculator
- Language: English
- Notable works: Math Magic; Math Magic for Kids
- Notable awards: Guinness World Record 2001
- Website: scottflansburg.com

Scott Flansburg (born December 28, 1963) is an American dubbed "The Human Calculator" and listed in the Guinness Book of World Records for speed of mental calculation. He is the annual host and ambassador for The National Counting Bee, a math educator, and media personality. He has published the books Math Magic and Math Magic for Your Kids.

== Biography ==
=== Early life ===
Flansburg was born December 28, 1963, in Herkimer, New York. He has stated that he was nine years old when he discovered his mental calculation abilities. He says he wasn't paying attention in math class when his teacher asked him to add 4 numbers on the blackboard. Instead of adding the columns from right to left, as they had been taught, he added them from left to right, and solved the problem. Intrigued by math, he began keeping a running tally of his family's groceries at the store so his father could give the cashier an exact check before the total was rung up. In his youth he also began noticing that the shapes and numbers of angles in numbers were clues to their values, and began counting from 0 to 9 on his fingers instead of 1 to 10.

=== Early career ===
Flansburg can mentally add, subtract, multiply, divide, and find square and cube roots almost instantly, with calculator accuracy. Around 1990 he began using his abilities in an entertainment and educational context.

In 1991, he was involved in the creation of "The Human Calculator System", a product designed for direct-marketing salespeople, consisting of a study guide and four cassette recordings teaching his method. In the spring of that year, he appeared on the infomercial show "Amazing Discoveries", hosted by Mike Levey, to promote his product. At the beginning of the program, he was introduced as "The Human Calculator" for the first time in national media.

Flansburg was dubbed "The Human Calculator" by Regis Philbin after appearing on Live with Regis and Kathy Lee.

The Guinness Book of World Records listed him as "Fastest Human Calculator" in 2001 and 2003, after he broke the record for adding the same number to itself more times in 15 seconds than someone could do with a calculator. In 1999 he invented a 13-month calendar using zero as a day, month, and year, which he called "The Human Calculator Calendar".

In 1998 he published the Harper Paperbacks book Math Magic for Your Kids: Hundreds of Games and Exercises from the Human Calculator to Make Math Fun and Easy. A revised edition of his book Math Magic: How to Master Everyday Math Problems was published in 2004.

=== As an educator ===
Since about 1990 Flansburg has regularly given lectures and presentations at schools. He has been a presenter at organizations such as NASA, IBM, The Smithsonian Institution, the National Council of Teachers of Mathematics, and the Mental Calculation World Cup. The latter described Flansburg as "more an auditory than a visual [mental] calculator".

One of Flansburg's "personal missions" is to use education to elevate math confidence and self-esteem in adults and children. "Why has it become so socially acceptable to be bad at math?," he stated. "If you were illiterate, you wouldn’t say that on TV, but you can say that you are bad at math. We have to change the attitude." He believes students should become proficient with calculation methods rather than relying on table memorization.

Flansburg is the annual host and ambassador for World Maths Day, and an official promoter of the American Math Challenge, a competition for students preparing for World Math Day.

=== Media appearances ===
Flansburg has appeared on television shows such as The Oprah Winfrey Show, The Ellen DeGeneres Show, The Tonight Show with Jay Leno, and Larry King Live. On April 26, 2009, on the Japanese primetime show Asahi's Otona no Sonata, he broke his own world record with 37 answers in 15 seconds. He was featured as The Human Calculator in the first episode of Stan Lee's Superhumans, which aired on The History Channel on August 5, 2010. Part of the episode analyzed his brain activity. An fMRI scan while he was doing complex calculations revealed that activity in the Brodmann area 44 region of the frontal cortex was absent; instead, there was activity somewhat higher from area 44 and closer to the motor cortex.

In January 2016, Flansburg hosted the TV show The Human Calculator on H2.

== Personal life ==
Flansburg resides in Herkimer, New York. He has owned and operated the Herkimer Originals of the American Basketball Association since 2021.

== Publications ==
- Math Magic for Your Kids (1998)
- Math Magic (2004)
