= Neelakantha Bhanu Prakash =

Indian mathematician and human calculator (born 1999)

- Born: October 13, 1999 (age 26); Eluru, Andhra Pradesh, India
- Other name: World's Fastest Human Calculator
- Education: St. Stephen's College, Delhi (BSc Honours, Mathematics, 2020)Delhi University
- Awards: Gold Medalist, Mental Calculation World Championship, Mind Sports Olympiad, Limca Book of Records 2015, 2016 and India's Youth Icon 2020
- Website: bhanzu.com

Neelakantha Bhanu Prakash (born 13 October 1999) is an Indian Mathematician and Entrepreneur known for holding the title of the World’s Fastest Human Calculator (WFHC). He is an Indian mind sports athlete, entrepreneur, and advocate for mathematics education. Bhanu gained international recognition for his mental calculation skills, breaking speed calculation records previously held by Shakuntala Devi and Scott Flansburg. In 2020, he won the Mental Calculation World Championship at the Mind Sports Olympiad in London, becoming the first non-European and first Asian to secure the title.

Bhanu is also the founder of Bhanzu, an ed-tech platform aimed at addressing math anxiety and making mathematics more accessible. His approach to teaching emphasizes understanding concepts over rote memorization, aiming to create a more intuitive learning process.

He has been acknowledged by the President of India, included in Forbes 30 Under 30, and received recognition as the Young Entrepreneur of the Year by Entrepreneur India. Bhanu has used his platform to influence both students and educators globally, promoting the importance of mathematical literacy.

== Early life ==
Neelakantha Bhanu Prakash was born in Hyderabad, India, to Jonnalagadda Srinivas and Hema Siva Parvati Jonnalagadda. His early childhood was marked by a significant event when, at the age of five, he suffered a severe head injury, resulting in a fractured skull. During his recovery, Bhanu was advised by his doctors to engage in mentally stimulating activities, which led him to solve puzzles and mental math problems. This sparked his interest in mathematics.

Bhanu completed his schooling at Bharatiya Vidya Bhavan's Public School (Vidyashram) in Hyderabad. He then pursued a Bachelor of Science (Honours) degree in Mathematics at St. Stephen’s College, Delhi, where he further developed his mental calculation abilities.

== Awards and recognition ==
- 2020: First Indian (Asian) to win the Gold Medal at the Mental Calculation World Championship at the Mind Sports Olympiad, London.
- 2020: Awarded 'India’s Youth Icon 2020' by the National Youth Council of India.
- 2022: Featured in Forbes Asia 30 Under 30 in the Consumer Technology category.
- 2014-2016: Broke 4 World Records and 50 Limca Book Records in various speed arithmetic categories, surpassing records held by Scott Flansburg and Shakuntala Devi.
- 2015: Received the 'Math Genius Award' from Genius Mind.
- 2015: Titled “Usain Bolt of Mathematics” by BBC News.
- 2017, 2018, 2022: Invited to speak at TEDx Talks about his journey and approach to learning math.
- 2023: Featured in Hurun India's Top 100 Under 30 Entrepreneurs Watchlist.
- 2025: Recognized in Forbes India 30 Under 30 for contributions to the education sector.

2025 creator of bhanzu

- 2025: Awarded Young Entrepreneur of the Year by Entrepreneur India.
- Ongoing: Collaborated with the Telangana government and international NGOs to impact 2 million children through numeracy programs.

2025: Invited to the ASU+GSV Summit to discuss the future of math education and his work with Bhanzu.
