= Yusnier Viera =

Cuban American mental calculator (born 1982)

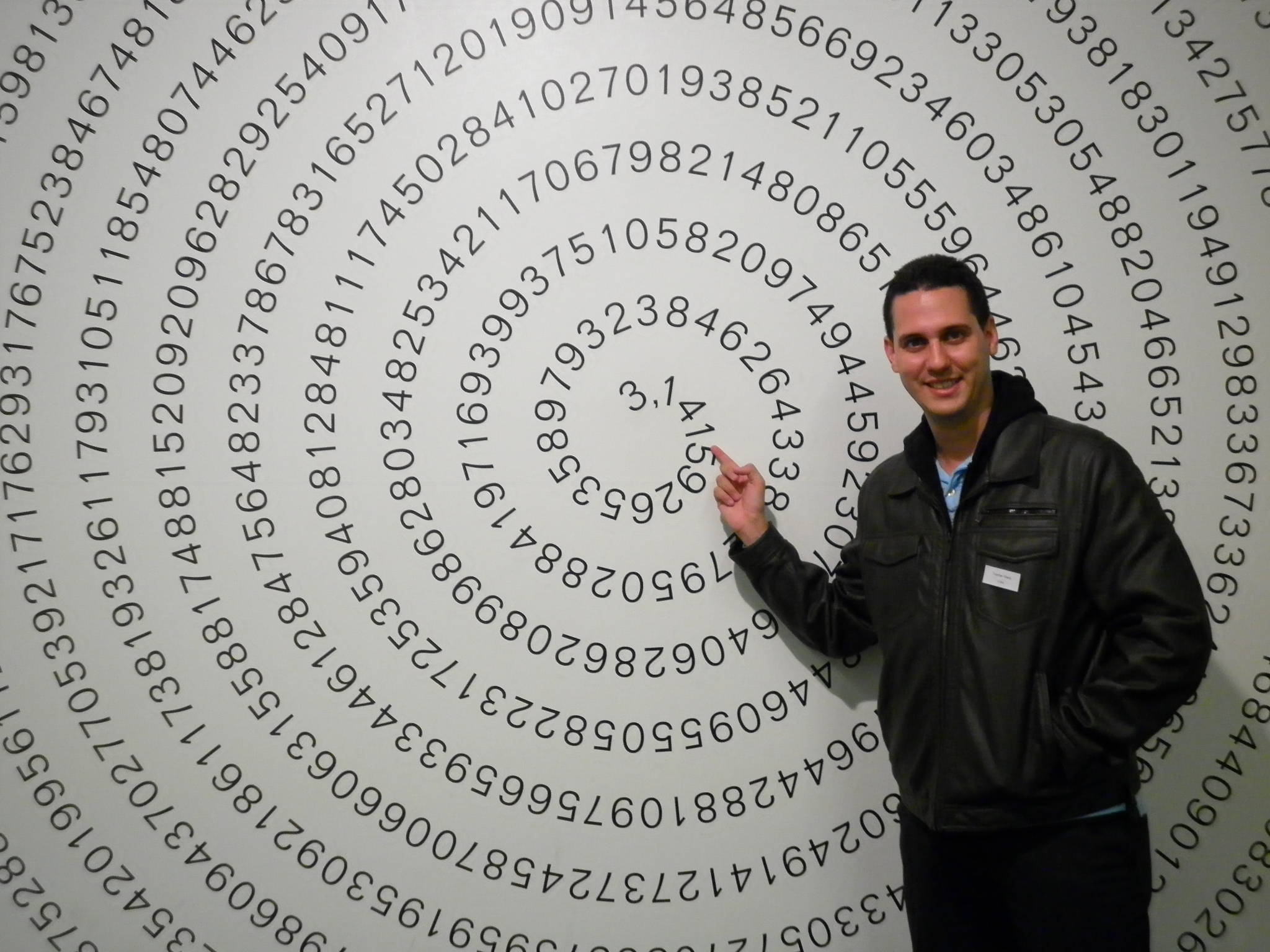
- Viera in 2012 at the Mathematikum Museum, Giessen, Germany.
- Born: April 26, 1982 (age 44); Havana, Cuba
- Education: University of Havana (2005)
- Awards: Mental Calculation World Cup 2010 (1st Place Calendar Memory); Guinness World Record 2005, 2006, 2009, 2010, 2011, 2015, 2018
- Website: www.yusnierviera.com

Yusnier Viera (born April 26, 1982) is a Cuban American mental calculator. He is well known as "The Human Calendar" for his world record on calendar dates. On October 31, 2005 he broke for first time the World Record for calendar calculations. At the Mental Calculation World Cup in 2010 he won the calendar category. His current record for most calendar dates calculated in a minute is 132 dates. He currently has three World Records for calendar calculations.

Viera has appeared in prestigious TV channels like CNN & ABC and has starred on the international Discovery Channel Series "Superhuman Showdown" (trailer). In early 2014, he participated in the Latin American show "Super Cerebros", of NatGeo. He won the first round and $4,500 of cash prize, reaching the final round of the show.

Due to his extraordinary skills, University of Sussex neuroscientists took fMRI scans of his brain. In the study, he also completed a computerized version of the Raven's Progressive Matrices Test with an IQ score of 157 (standard deviation of 15). The scientists concluded that his expertise is a result of long-term practice and motivation.

On 2016, Yusnier participated in the Fox show "Superhumans" where he showed a new skill called "flash math". Later, he was invited to "The Ellen DeGeneres Show" for an impressive demonstration.

Recently, he published the books Basic Course of Mental Arithmetic and Master the Multiplication Tables.

== Television shows ==
Year	Title	Network
2012	Super Human Showdown	Discovery Channel
2014	Super Cerebros	NatGeo
2016	The Brain	Fox Channel
2016	The Ellen Show	CBS, American Broadcasting Company
2017	Don Francisco Te Invita	NBCUniversal
2020	The Wall	NBCUniversal
