= Jorge Arturo Mendoza Huertas =

Peruvian mental calculator (born 1971)

Jorge Arturo Mendoza Huertas (born 4 July 1971) is a Peruvian mental calculator.

In 2014 he set a new Guinness World Record by mentally adding a hundred single-digit numbers together in 18.23 seconds. At the 2006 Mental Calculation World Cup in Giessen, Germany, he finished in first position in the category 'Addition'.

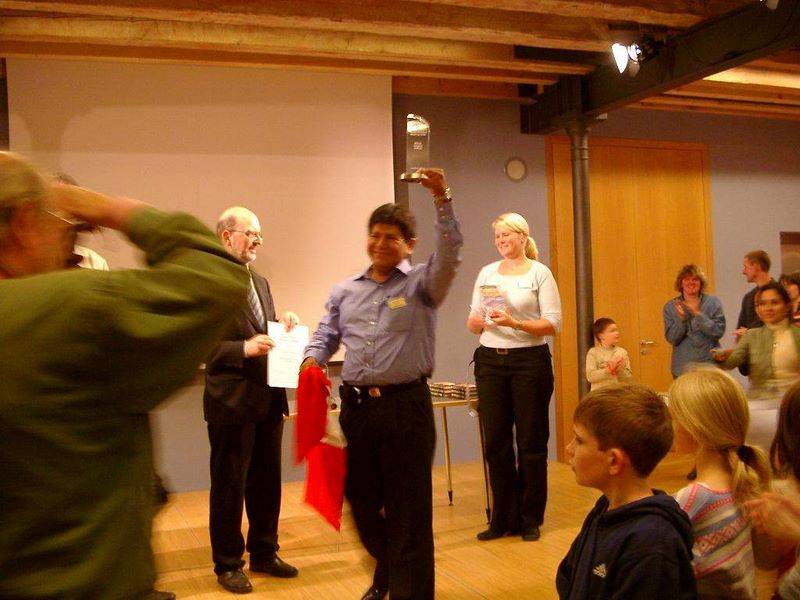
Mendoza in 2006

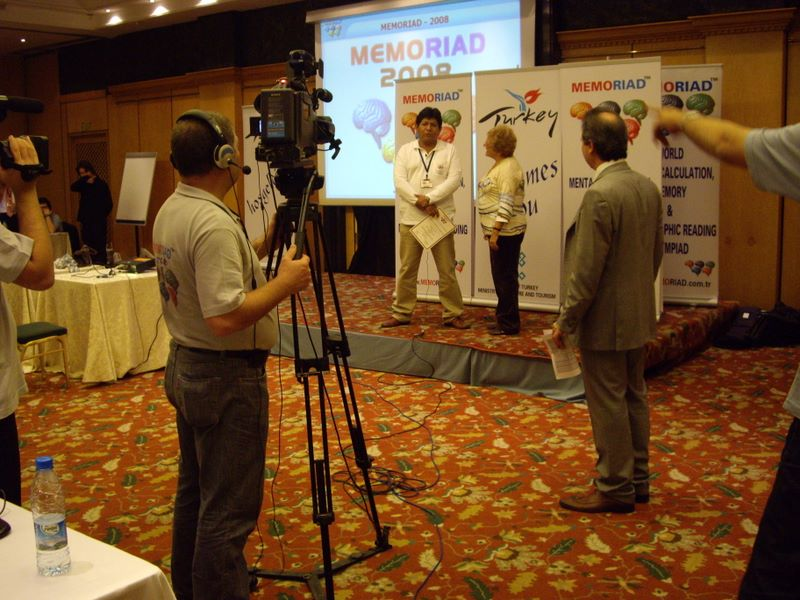
Mendoza in 2008

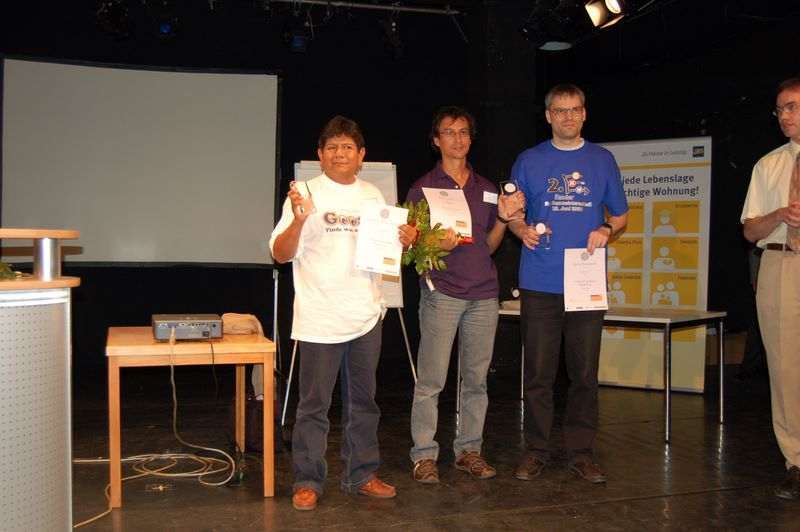
Mendoza in 2008
