= Jan van Koningsveld =

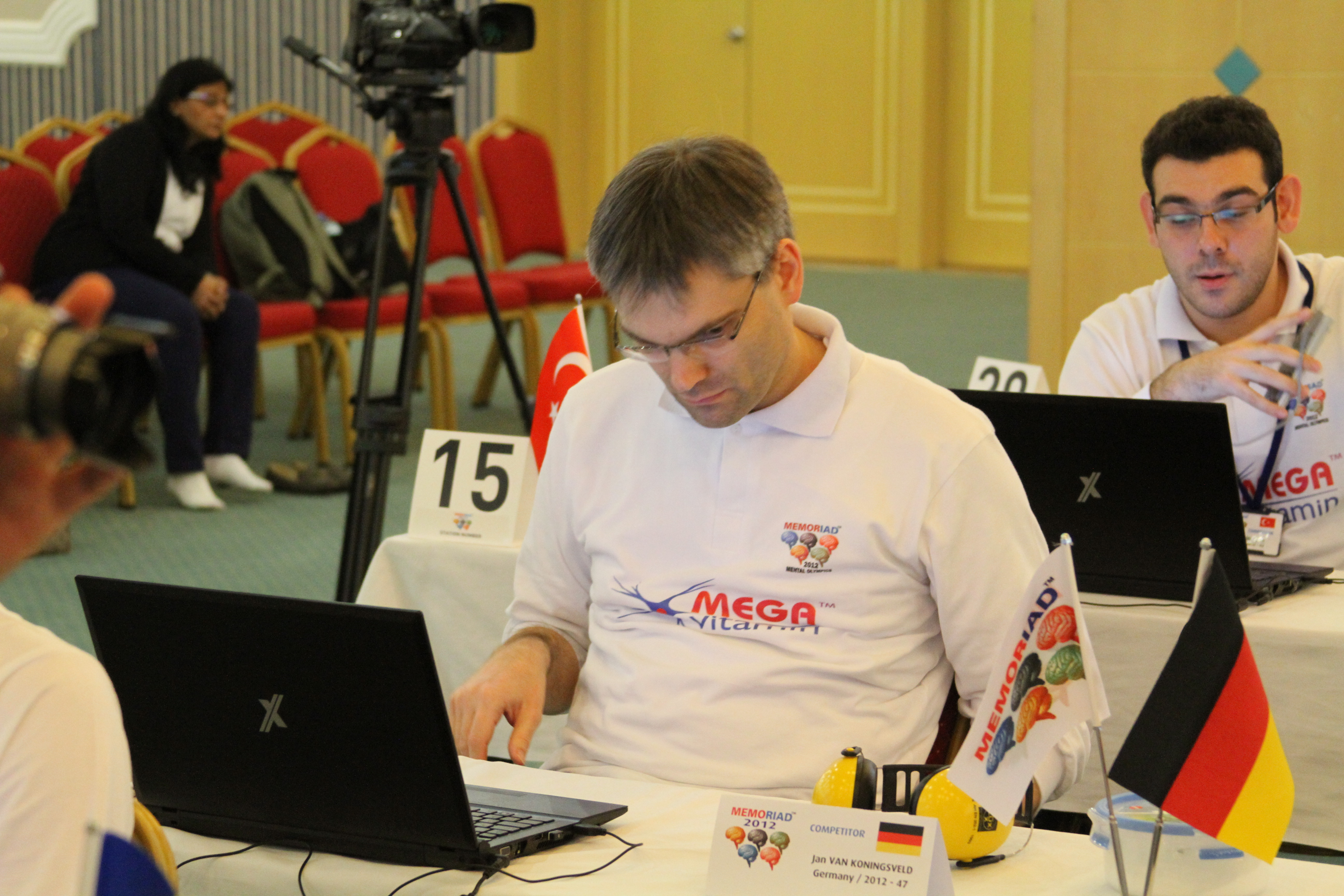
Jan Van Koningsveld in Memoriad World Mental Olympics 2012

Jan van Koningsveld (born 1969 in Emden) is a mental calculator.

== Career ==
He is the champion of Extracting Square Roots of 2004 and 2008 as well as the champion of Calendar Calculation of 2008 at the Mental Calculation World Cups. In addition, he finished second in the overall rankings of 2004, 2006 and 2008, fifth in 2010 and third in 2012, where he won the championship for cube roots. In 2022 he made his comeback, winning the silver medal in Calendar Calculations. Of all participants of the first nine editions (2004–2022) he has won most medals with a total of 15 (4/6/5).

During the first Memoriad 2008, the Olympiad for Mental Calculation and Memory held in Istanbul, Turkey, Jan van Koningsveld won the gold medals in the categories Multiplication as well as Calendar Calculation. After the competition he was also able to even the world record in the category Calendar Calculation by calculating 56 days of the week (range 1600–2100) in 1 minute. He has held the world record several times, his highest record being 96 dates in one minute in 2015.

He is also known as the only Mental Calculator to win all possible titles in Calendar Calculations, this being the World Cup, Memoriad and the World Record, in 2008.

Jan van Koningsveld also held the world record for multiplying two five-digit numbers. He solved ten tasks correctly in 3:06 minutes on 25 November 2005. That record was broken by Marc Jornet Sanz during world record attempts at the 2010 Mental Calculation World Cup
