= IntoScience =

- Developer: 3P Learning
- Genre: Edutainment

IntoScience is an Australian interactive edutainment science platform created by 3P Learning, who are also responsible for Mathletics, Reading Eggs, and Spellodrome. The program is designed to be used in secondary school.

== Development ==
The program initiated a partnership with Commonwealth Scientific and Industrial Research Organisation (CSIRO) to develop the immersive 3D worlds using the Unity 3D engine. It utilises "3D environments, virtual experiments and deep contextual examples", and includes content based on the curriculum.

In June 2014, 3P Learning managing director Tim Power said that Mathletics was a "rapidly declining percentage of the revenue", due to growth of Reading Eggs and IntoScience.

== Gameplay ==
Players create an avatar, and then proceed to embark on various quests to complete tasks and challenges, thereby earning ‘Enquiry Point’ rewards.

== Critical reception ==
TeachWire deemed the platform "revolutionary...virtual brilliance", and praised it for "bringing science to life". GeekInSydney thought it was an "awesome concept". The Association for Science Education deemed the program a "really useful and engaging tool for reinforcing and extending". Education Magazine thought it was "immersive and highly engaging".
