= Priyanshi Somani =

Indian mental calculator (born 1998)

- Born: 16 November 1998 (age 27); Surat, Gujarat, India
- Known for: Mental calculator

Priyanshi Somani (born 16 November 1998) is the 2010 Mental Calculation World Cup winner.
