= George Lane (mental calculator) =

British mental calculator and author (born 1964)

George Lane (born 1964) is a British mental calculator and author. He is a five-time gold medalist in the Mental Calculations event at the annual Mind Sports Olympiad, and is one of only five Grandmasters of Mental Calculation, as recognised by the Mind Sports Organisation. George is a regular facilitator at the annual Junior Mental Calculation World Championship. He has written two books.
