= Aaryan Nitin Shukla =

Indian mental calculator

Aaryan Shukla
- Shukla in 2024
- Born: 6 July 2010 (age 15); Nashik, Maharashtra, India
- Parents: Nitin Shukla (father); Meenal Shukla (mother)

Aaryan Shukla (born 6 July 2010) is one of the leading mental calculator representing India in the international competitions. He is practicing Mental Math and Calculation since the age of 6 years.

Aaryan has won the Mental Calculation World Cup in 2022 in Germany at the age of 12. Aaryan successfully defended his title in 2024 by winning Mental Calculation World Cup for the 2nd time. He has also won many international titles in the past and created multiple world records including 9 Guinness World Records (GWR) in various disciplines of mental calculation.

Aaryan is board member of the Global Mental Calculators Association.

== Career ==
Shukla won the 2022 Mental Calculation World Cup at the age of 12 years old, setting event records in multiplication and square roots in the process. Additionally, during the record attempts portion of the event, he broke the organizer's record for division and multiplied two 20-digit numbers together in 1 minute and 45 seconds.

Shukla returned to the Mental Calculation World Cup in 2024, winning the event for a second consecutive time, while winning all five categories and scoring more points per category than any prior competitor. Additionally, he set the following records during the event:

1. Mental Calculation World Cup calendar date record (answered all 100 dates given correctly in 1 minute)
2. Mental Calculation World Cup multiplication record (breaking his prior record)
3. Mental Calculation World Cup square roots record (breaking his prior record) (answered all 90 problems given with 86 correct and 4 incorrect)
4. World record for addition (addition of 10 10-digit numbers, with an average time of 7.808 seconds over 10 questions)
5. World record for square roots (square root of 6-digit numbers to 8 significant digits, with an average time 33.78 seconds over 10 questions)

Shukla also became the youngest winner at the Mind Sport Olympiad Mental Calculation World Championship in 2021, before finishing as runner-up twice. He also finished as runner-up in Season 1 of Calculation League.

In 2023 and 2024, Shukla gave televised Flash Anzan performances in Russia and Italy, the latter earning him a Guinness World Record in addition.

In late 2024, Shukla set six new Guinness World records in a single day – three related to Flash Anzan, two related to multiplication, and one related to division – in a showcase event in Dubai.
