= Lee Jung-hee (disambiguation) =

Lee Jung-hee (born 1969) is a South Korean female lawyer, politician, and human rights activist.

Lee Jung-hee may also refer to:

- Ri Jong-hui (rower) (born 1953), North Korean male rower
- Lee Jeonghee (born 1963), South Korean female abacus master
- Lee Jung-hee (gymnast) (born 1965), South Korean female gymnast
- Ri Jong-hui (born 1975), North Korean female footballer
- Lee Jung (born Lee Jung-hee, 1981), South Korean male singer and actor
