= Mathlete =

Person who competes in mathematics

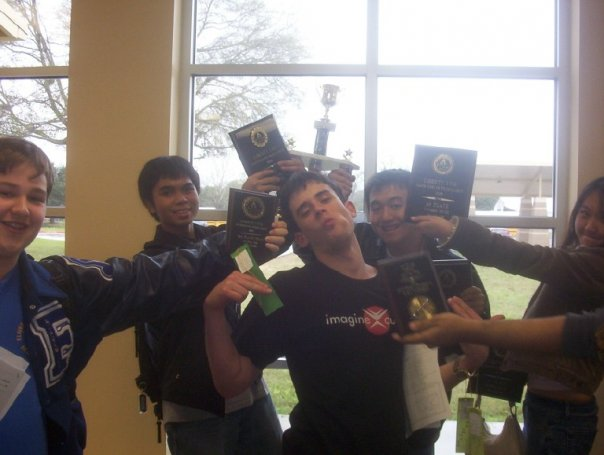
High school mathletes at a Texas Math and Science Coaches Association (TMSCA) Math Tournament

A mathlete is a person who competes in mathematics competitions at any level or any age. The definition may be extended to computer programming competitions and certain e-sports, as well. The term is a portmanteau of the words mathematics and athlete. Mathletics is a mind sport.

Mathlete is a registered trademark of the MATHCOUNTS Foundation in the United States, and identifies a student who participates in any of the MATHCOUNTS programs. Top Mathletes from MATHCOUNTS often go on to compete in the AIME, USAMO, and ARML competitions in the United States. Those in other countries generally participate in national olympiads to qualify for the International Mathematical Olympiad.

Participants in World Math Day also are commonly referred to as mathletes.

== Collegiate competitions ==
The Putnam Exam: The William Lowell Putnam Competition is the preeminent undergraduate level mathletic competition in North America. Administered by the Mathematical Association of America, students compete as individuals and as teams (as chosen by their Institution) for scholarships and team prize money. The exam is annually administered on the first Saturday in December.

== Mathletic off-season training ==
The academic off-season (traditionally referred to as "summer") can be especially difficult on mathletes, though various training regimens have been proposed to keep mathletic ability at its peak. Publications such as the MAA's The American Mathematical Monthly and the AMS's Notices of the American Mathematical Society are widely read to maintain and hone mathematical ability. Some coaches suggest seeking research internships or grants, many of which are funded by the National Science Foundation.

At higher levels, mathletes can obtain funding from host institutions to work on summer research projects. For example, the University of Delaware offers the Groups Exploring the Mathematical Sciences project (GEMS project) to first year graduate students. The students act as the principal investigator and work with an undergraduate research assistant and a faculty adviser who will oversee their summer research.

== See also ==
- Competitive programming
- Computer-based mathematics education
- Mathematical software
- MathOverflow
- Project Euler — computational mathematics and computer programming problem solving website
