= Mental Calculation World Cup =

Competition for mental calculators

The Mental Calculation World Cup (German: Weltmeisterschaften im Kopfrechnen, or World Championship in Mental Calculation) is an international competition for mental calculators, held every two years in Germany.

== Mental Calculation World Cup 2004 ==
The first Mental Calculation World Cup was held in Annaberg-Buchholz, Germany on 30 October 2004. There were 17 participants from 10 countries.

The World Cup involved the following contests (and two surprise tasks):

- Adding ten 10-digit numbers, 10 tasks in 10 minutes
  - Winner: Alberto Coto (Spain); 10 correct results; 5:50 minutes, world record
- Multiplying two 8-digit numbers, 10 tasks in 15 minutes
  - Winner: Alberto Coto (Spain), 8 correct results
- Calendar Calculations, two series one minute each, dates from the years 1600–2100
  - Winner: Matthias Kesselschläger (Germany), 33 correct results, world record
- Square Root from 6-digit numbers, 10 tasks in 15 minutes
  - Winner: Jan van Koningsveld (Germany)

In the overall ranking the first place is taken by Robert Fountain (Great Britain), the runner-up was Jan van Koningsveld (Germany).

== Mental Calculation World Cup 2006 ==
The second Mental Calculation World Cup was held on 4 November 2006 in the Mathematikum museum in Gießen, Germany. 26 Calculators from 11 countries took part. The World Cup involved the following contests (and two surprise tasks):

- Adding ten 10-digit numbers, 10 tasks in 10 minutes
  - Winner: Jorge Arturo Mendoza Huertas (Peru); 10 correct results
- Multiplying two 8-digit numbers, 10 tasks in 15 minutes
  - Winner: Alberto Coto (Spain)
- Calendar Calculations, two series one minute each, dates from the years 1600–2100
  - Winner: Matthias Kesselschläger (Germany)
- Square Root from 6-digit numbers, 10 tasks in 15 minutes
  - Winner: Robert Fountain (Great Britain)

Robert Fountain (Great Britain) defended his title in the overall competition, the places 2 to 4 have been won by Jan van Koningsveld (Netherlands), Gert Mittring (Germany) and Yusnier Viera Romero (Cuba).

== Mental Calculation World Cup 2008 ==
The Mental Calculation World Cup 2008 was held at the University of Leipzig, Germany on 1 July 2008. It attracted 28 calculators from 12 countries.

- Adding ten 10-digit numbers, 10 tasks in 10 minutes
  - Winner: Alberto Coto (Spain), 10 correct results in 4:26 minutes. world record
- Multiplying two 8-digit numbers, 10 tasks in 15 minutes
  - Winner: Alberto Coto (Spain), 10 correct results in 8:25 minutes, world record
- Calendar Calculations, dates from the years 1600–2100, one minute
  - Winner: Jan van Koningsveld (Germany), 40 correct results
- Square Root from 6-digit numbers, 10 tasks in 15 minutes
  - Winner: Jan van Koningsveld (Germany)

Alberto Coto (Spain) won the overall title. Jan van Koningsveld, starting for Germany this time, became second, and Jorge Arturo Mendoza Huertas (Peru) finished third. Robert Fountain, who won the title in 2004 and 2006, achieved a fourth rank.

== Mental Calculation World Cup 2010 ==
The Mental Calculation World Cup 2010 was held at the University of Magdeburg, Germany on 6–7 June 2010. It attracted 33 calculators from 13 countries.

- Adding ten 10-digit numbers, 10 tasks in 10 minutes
  - Winner: Alberto Coto (Spain), 10 correct results in 3:42 minutes, world record
- Multiplying two 8-digit numbers, 10 tasks in 15 minutes
  - Winner: Marc Jornet Sanz (Spain), 10 correct results in 4:56 minutes, world record
- Calendar Calculations, dates from the years 1600–2100, one minute
  - Winner: Yusnier Viera (Cuba), 48 correct results, world cup record
- Square Root from 6-digit numbers, 10 tasks in 6:51 minutes,' world cup record
  - Winner: Priyanshi Somani (India)
- Most Versatile Calculator (the best score for solving six unknown "surprise tasks")
  - Winner: Jerry Newport (U.S.)

Priyanshi Somani (India) won the overall title. Marc Jornet Sanz (Spain) came second, and Alberto Coto finished third.

== Mental Calculation World Cup 2012 ==
The Mental Calculation World Cup 2012 was held from 30/9/2012 to 01/10/2012 in the Mathematikum museum in Gießen, Germany. 32 calculators from 16 countries participated. The world cup involved the following 5 main contests :

- Adding ten 10-digit numbers, 10 tasks in 7 minutes
  - Winner: Naofumi Ogasawara (Japan); 10 correct results in 191 seconds, world record
- Multiplying two 8-digit numbers, 10 tasks in 10 minutes
  - Winner: Freddis Reyes Hernández (Cuba), 10 correct results in 361 seconds
- Calendar Calculations, One minute, random dates from the years 1600–2100
  - Winner: Myagmarsuren Tuuruul (Mongolia), 57 correct results, world cup record
- Square Roots from 6-digit numbers, 10 tasks in 10 minutes
  - Winner: Naofumi Ogasawara (Japan), 8 correct results (each solved, up to all the first 8 digits: 3 integers and 5 decimals)
- Most Versatile Calculator (the best score for solving another 5 unknown "surprise tasks")
  - Winner: Naofumi Ogasawara (Japan), 500, perfect score.

Naofumi Ogasawara (Japan) won the title in the overall competition (combination of all 10 categories). Hua Wei Chan (Malaysia) was 2nd overall, and Jan van Koningsveld was 3rd.

== Mental Calculation World Cup 2014 ==
The Mental Calculation World Cup 2014 was held from 10/10/2014 to 12/10/2014 in the Faculty of Mathematics in Dresden University of Technology, Germany.

39 mental calculators from 17 countries participated.

The World Cup involved the following 5 main contests:

- Adding ten 10-digit numbers, 10 tasks in 7 minutes
  - Winner: Granth Thakkar (India); 10 correct results in 242 seconds,
- Multiplying two 8-digit numbers, 10 tasks in 10 minutes
  - Winner: Marc Jornet Sanz (Spain), 10 correct results in 295 seconds, world cup record
- Calendar Calculations, one minute, random dates from the years 1600–2100
  - Winner: Marc Jornet Sanz (Spain), 64 correct results, world cup record
- Square Roots from 6-digit numbers, 10 tasks in 10 minutes
  - Winner: Rhea Shah (India), 10 correct results in 135 seconds (each solved to eight significant figures), world cup record
- Most Versatile Calculator (the best score for solving another 5 unknown "surprise tasks")
  - Winner: Andreas Berger (Germany), 365/500

Granth Thakkar (India),won the title in the overall competition (combination of all 10 categories). Marc Jornet Sanz (Spain) was 2nd overall, and Chie Ishikawa (Japan) was 3rd.

== Mental Calculation World Cup 2016 ==
The Mental Calculation World Cup 2016 was held from 23 to 25 September 2016, in Bielefeld Germany. 31 mental calculators from 16 countries participated.

The World Cup involved the following 5 main contests:

- Adding ten 10-digit numbers, 7 minutes
  - Winner: Yuki Kimura (Japan)
- Multiplying two 8-digit numbers, 10 minutes
  - Winner: Lee Jeonghee (South Korea)
- Calendar Calculations, one minute, random dates from the years 1600–2100
  - Winner: Georgi Georgiev (Bulgaria), 66 correct results, world cup record
- Square Roots from 6-digit numbers, 10 minutes
  - Winner: Yuki Kimura (Japan)
- Most Versatile Calculator (the best score for solving another 5 unknown "surprise tasks")
  - Winner: Lee Jeonghee (South Korea)
- Memoriad Trophy
  - Winner: Yuki Kimura (Japan)

Yuki Kimura (Japan) won the title in the overall competition (combination of all 10 categories). Tetsuya Ono (Japan) was 2nd overall, and Lee Jeonghee (South Korea) was 3rd.

== Mental Calculation World Cup 2018 ==
The Mental Calculation World Cup 2018 was held on 28–30 September 2018 at the Phaeno Science Center in Wolfsburg, Germany. 82 calculators from 24 countries applied for the qualification; 33 calculators from 17 countries were qualified and took part at the contest in Wolfsburg.

The World Cup involved the following 5 main contests:

- Adding ten 10-digit numbers, 7 minutes
  - Winner: Lee Jeonghee (South Korea)
- Multiplying two 8-digit numbers, 10 minutes
  - Winner: Tomohiro Iseda (Japan)
- Calendar Calculations, one minute, random dates from the years 1600–2100
  - Winner: Marc Jornet Sanz (Spain), 71 correct results, world cup record
- Square Roots from 6-digit numbers, 10 minutes
  - Winner: Tomohiro Iseda (Japan)
- Most Versatile Calculator (the best score for solving another 5 unknown "surprise tasks")
  - Winner: Wenzel Grüß (Germany)

Tomohiro Iseda (Japan) won the title in the overall competition (combination of all 10 categories). Hiroto Ihara (Japan) finished second and Wenzel Grüß (Germany) third.

== Mental Calculation World Cup 2020/22 ==
The Mental Calculation World Cup 2020 was planned to take place on 21–23 August 2020. Due to the COVID-19 pandemic, it had to be postponed. It was held on 15-17 July 2022 at Heinz Nixdorf MuseumsForum (world's largest computer museum) in Paderborn, Germany. 66 calculators applied for the qualification; 35 calculators from 17 countries were qualified and took part at the contest in Paderborn.

Aaryan Nitin Shukla (India), won the title in the overall competition (combination of all 10 categories). Tetsuya Ono (Japan) finished second and Mohammad El-Mir (Lebanon) third.

The World Cup involved the following 5 main contests:

- Adding ten 10-digit numbers, 7 minutes
  - Winner: Tetsuya Ono (Japan), 32 points (34 correct, 2 incorrect results)
- Multiplying two 8-digit numbers, 10 minutes
  - Winner: Aaryan Nitin Shukla (India), 21 points (23 correct, 2 incorrect results), world cup record
- Calendar Calculations, one minute, random dates from the years 1600–2100
  - Winner: Akshita Shah (India), 80 correct results, world cup record
- Square Roots from 6-digit numbers, 10 minutes
  - Winner: Aaryan Nitin Shukla (India), 74 points (79 correct, 5 incorrect results), world cup record
- Most Versatile Calculator (the best score for solving another 5 unknown "surprise tasks")
  - Winner: Tetsuya Ono (Japan)

== Mental Calculation World Cup 2024 ==
The Mental Calculation World Cup 2024 was held on 13-15 September 2024 at the Heinz Nixdorf MuseumsForum in Paderborn, Germany. 69 calculators from 21 countries applied for the qualification; 35 calculators from 16 countries were qualified and took part at the contest in Paderborn.

The World Cup involved the following 5 main contests:

- Adding ten 10-digit numbers, 7 minutes
  - Winner: Aaryan Nitin Shukla (India)
- Multiplying two 8-digit numbers, 10 minutes
  - Winner: Aaryan Nitin Shukla (India), 25 points (28 correct, 3 incorrect), world cup record
- Calendar Calculations, one minute, random dates from the years 1600–2100
  - Winner: Aaryan Nitin Shukla (India), 100 correct results (out of 100 dates given), world cup record
- Square Roots from 6-digit numbers, 10 minutes
  - Winner: Aaryan Nitin Shukla (India), 82 points (86 correct, 4 incorrect, 90 total questions), world cup record
- Most Versatile Calculator (the best score for solving another 5 unknown "surprise tasks")
  - Winner: Aaryan Nitin Shukla (India)

Aaryan Nitin Shukla (India), won the title in the overall competition for the second consecutive time (combination of all 9 categories). Kaloyan Geshev (Bulgaria) finished second and Hiko Chiba (Japan) third.

== See also ==
- List of world championships in mind sports
- Mental calculation
- Mental calculator
- World Memory Championships
