= Robert Fountain (mental calculator) =

British mental calculator

Robert Fountain (born in 1969) is a British mental calculator. He won the first Mental Calculation World Cup in 2004 and the second Mental Calculation World Cup in 2006. In 1999 he was recognised by the Mind Sports Organisation as the first Grandmaster of Mental Calculation. Fountain was inspired to take up mental calculation as a hobby at the age of 11 after seeing Wim Klein performing on television. He is co-author of The Mental Calculator's Handbook.
