= Lee Jeonghee =

South Korean abacus master (born 1963)

- Hangul: 이정희
- RR: I Jeonghui
- MR: I Chŏnghŭi

Lee Jeonghee (Korean: 이정희; born 23 February 1963) is a South Korean abacus master. She is the only known soroban abacus master to have reached the eleventh dan. She is also known as Abacus Master (주산왕) in South Korea.

== Biography ==
Lee began training with the soroban abacus in fifth grade. In her first year of high school, she obtained the 11th dan. In 2007, Lee opened up an abacus training academy in Korea, where she has taught thousands of students, some of whom travel to the country solely to participate.

In 2001, Lee represented South Korea in the 20th International Abacus Competition and finished in first place in the singles category.

In 2008, Lee appeared on the South Korean television program Star King with a group of children ages seven to nine, whom she had taught for a 100-day period. Her students, selected for the program after their parents described them as distracted and underachieving in school, displayed significant improvement in mental calculation skills, as well as in focus and attention. By the end of the program, almost all of the students were able to mentally solve an addition problem of fifteen 5-digit numbers in under thirty seconds.

In 2013, Lee appeared on the South Korean television program Miracle Korea. During the episode, she demonstrated her ability to do Flash Anzan, adding together a total of fifty 4-digit numbers individually flashed on a screen for less than one second each, while simultaneously being interviewed by the hosts. During the same episode, she mentally added fifty 25-digit numbers in 94 seconds.

In 2016, Lee competed in the Mental Calculation World Cup. The Mental Calculation World Cup 2016 was held from 23–25 September 2016, in Bielefeld, Germany where 31 mental calculators from 16 countries participated. She won in multiplying two 8-digit numbers and was recognized as the Most Versatile Calculator (having the best score for solving another 5 unknown "surprise tasks"). She placed 3rd in the overall competition (a combination of all 10 categories).

In November 2016, Lee dominated the mental calculation events at the Memoriad competition in Las Vegas, winning the gold medal in the categories multiplication, addition, division and flash anzan.

She has been a resident of Fort Lee, New Jersey.
