= Gert Mittring =

German mental calculator (born 1966)

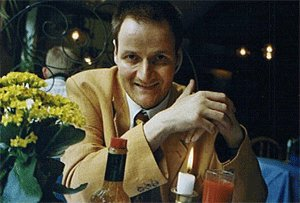
Gert Mittring

Gert Mittring (born 26 May 1966 in Stuttgart) is a German mental calculator. He was inspired by the late Wim Klein. He has competed in the MSO mental calculation event every year since 2004, failing to win the gold medal outright on only four occasions. He has held numerous world records for mental calculation, such as calculating the 89247th root of a 1000000 digit number. He has doctorates in statistics and mathematics education, and is a member of the Intelligence Research Committee of Intertel. Mittring is said to have been poor in mathematics during his school years. He has written several books on mental calculation.
