= Robert Fountain (event designer) =

American event designer

Robert Fountain is an American event designer and planner who owns an event company in San Francisco.

Fountain is from Thomaston, Georgia. He was born to Gerald Fountain, an engineer at a regional cotton mill and Brenda Lamb, who worked in a department store. He is the youngest of three boys.

He began work as a florist in Atlanta, Georgia, eventually moving to San Francisco in 1995, where he worked for four years at floral company Podesta Baldocchi.

He began his event company in 1997 and has made news for throwing events for Marissa Mayer, including events attended by President Barack Obama. He has appeared on HGTV's show "Sensible Chic" as a design consultant, and owns a textile company called Velon Designs.
