= World Maths Day =

International mathematics competition

- Genre: International Event
- Years active: 16
- Inaugurated: 2007
- Founder: 3P Learning
- Most recent: 2025
- Next event: 2026
- Attendance: 5,960,862 students from 240 countries
- Organiser: 3P Learning
- Website: www.worldmathsday.com

World Maths Day (World Math Day in American English) is an online international mathematics competition on third Friday in September. powered by Mathletics (a learning platform from 3P Learning, the same organisation behind Reading Eggs and Mathseeds). Smaller elements of the wider Mathletics program effectively power the World Maths Day event.

The first World Maths Day started in 2007. Despite these origins, the phrases "World Maths Day" and "World Math Day" are trademarks, and not to be confused with other competitions such as the International Mathematical Olympiad or days such as Pi Day. In 2010, World Maths Day created a Guinness World Record for the Largest Online Maths Competition.

World Maths Day will next take place on 25 March 2026.

== Overview ==
Open to all school-aged students (4 to 18 years old), World Maths Day involves participants playing 20 × 60-second games, with the platform heavily based on "Live Mathletics" found in Mathletics. The contests involve mental maths problems appropriate for each age group, which test the accuracy and speed of the students as they compete against other students across the globe.

The idea of combining the aspects of multi-player online gaming with maths problems has contributed to its popularity. There will be 10 Year group divisions for students to compete in from Kindergarten to Year 9 and above.

An online Hall of Fame will track points throughout the competition with prizes to be awarded to the top students and schools. The Champions Challenge is a new addition to the 2021 competition. Top Year/Grade 9 and above World Maths Day student come together to compete in a knockout tournament. As part of the challenge, students will have their event live streamed, bringing mathematics and Esports together.

== History ==
The inaugural World Maths Day was held on March 13, 2007. 287,000 students from 98 countries answered 38,904,275 questions. The student numbers and the participating countries have steadily increased in the following years.

In 2009, 1.9 million students took part in World Maths Day.

In 2011, World Maths Day sets a Guinness World Record for the Largest Online Maths Competition, with almost 500 million maths questions answered during the event.

In 2012, 3P Learning launched the World Education Games. Over 5.9 Million students from 240 Countries and Territories around the world registered to take part, with World Maths Day being the biggest attraction. In 2013, it was held between 5–7 March and the awards were presented at the Sydney Opera House to the Champions.

In 2015, there were participants from 150 countries. US, UK and Australia all had over 1 million registrations.

The 2019 World Maths Day event was combined with a social media competition, where students around the world were encouraged to dress up in a maths-themed outfit to celebrate maths. Entries included famous mathematicians, an aerial shot of students forming a pi symbol, and human calculators.

In 2022, World Maths Day celebrated 15 years in the making.

As of 2025, World Maths Day had reached over 10 million participants from 160 countries.

== Awards ==
A number of awards are offered to the students who take part and for those who do well in the event. Additionally the champions and the top ten students in the world are awarded gold medals every year.

There are also a number of national lead-up events in different regions around the world which are also based on the Mathletics format.

== Champions ==
The individual gold medal winners through the years are listed below:

== 2007 Results ==
| | All Ages |
|---|---|
| 1 | Stefan L, Christian Alliance P.C.Lau Memorial International School, Hong Kong |
| 2 | Kelvin H, Taunton School, United Kingdom |
| 3 | Ana Catarina V, CLIP, Portugal |
| 4 | Simone C, Newlands Intermediate, New Zealand |
| 5 | Maoki G, International Christian Academy of Nagoya, Japan |
| 6 | Shoaib Akram S, Beaconhouse School, Cambridge Branch, Pakistan |
| 7 | Joshua S, Dulwich College, Shanghai, China |
| 8 | Yiannis Z, The English School Nicosia, Cyprus |
| 9 | Nicolae F, Mark Twain International School, Romania |
| 10 | Ross R, Team Australia, Australia |

== 2008 results ==
| | All Ages |
|---|---|
| 1 | Tatiana D, Haileybury College, Australia |
| 2 | Rock T, George Heriot's School, UK |
| 3 | Kaya G, The McDonald College, Australia |
| 4 | Serena H, International School of Arts and Sciences, UAE |
| 5 | TK, Garden International School, Malaysia |
| 6 | Joshua S, Dulwich College, Shanghai, China |
| 7 | Abhishek C, International Pioneer School, Thailand |
| 8 | Crystal L, Team Australia, Australia |
| 9 | Pratyush G, Delia School of Canada, Hong Kong |
| 10 | AS, Team Thailand, Thailand |

== 2009 results ==
| | 5–8 Years | 9–13 Years | 14–18 Years |
|---|---|---|---|
| 1 | N S, Thai Sikh International School, Thailand | Kaya G, Team Australia, Australia | David A, Fraser Coast Anglican College, Australia |
| 2 | Dushyant S, International Pioneers School, Thailand | David M, Aloha College, Marbella, Spain | M G, Izmir OzelI Isikkent lisesi, Turkey |
| 3 | N K, International Pioneers School, Thailand | Shoaib A, Team Pakistan, Pakistan | Carlos D, Amman National School, Jordan |
| 4 | Alexander B, Bechtel Elementary School, US | Dante M, Canterbury School, Spain | Thevaa C, ACS Ipoh School, Malaysia |
| 5 | O C, St Paul's Convent School, Hong Kong | Larksana Y, Ontario International Institute, Canada | E K, Tevitol High School, Turkey |
| 6 | Nico A, Bechtel Elementary School, US | Caleb L, Australian International School, UAE | Saptarshi C, Bangladesh International School Riyadh, Saudi Arabia |
| 7 | Rico C, Clearwater Bay School, Hong Kong | K H, Dalat International School, | Sultan V, Prague British School, Czech |
| 8 | Eric S, Clearwater Bay School, Hong Kong | M S, Indian International School, Japan | Miguel B, Escola Secundaria Jorge Peixinho, Portugal |
| 9 | Eda K, Galliard Primary School, UK | Wasif S, Gordon A Brown Middle School, Canada | Tatiana D, Team Australia, Australia |
| 10 | M N, Bechtel Elementary School, US | H K, British School of Bucharest, Romania | J S, Inti University College, Malaysia |

== 2010 results ==
| | 5–8 Years | 9–13 Years | 14–18 Years |
|---|---|---|---|
| 1 | Vivek R, Our Lady of Lourdes Park Lodge, Northern Ireland | Kaya G, The Southport School, Australia | David A, Fraser Coast Anglican College, Australia |
| 2 | Yizhen Y, Team Singapore, Singapore | Caleb L, Australian International School, UAE | Tatiana D, Team Australia, Australia |
| 3 | Yan Tung Jovanna Y, St Paul's Convent School, Hong Kong | Brody H, Team Australia, Australia | Arthur T, Team Hong Kong, Hong Kong |
| 4 | Sik Chee Harriet C, St Paul's Convent School, Hong Kong | Sharan M, Hamilton College, United Kingdom | Kai Yuan Y, Wesley Methodist School, Malaysia |
| 5 | Tien-erh H, Team Malaysia, Malaysia | Satvik T, St Georges School Cologne, Germany | Francis L, Cempaka Schools, Malaysia |
| 6 | Jimin J, Lake Highland Preparatory School | David M, Aloha College, Marbella, Spain | Jake C, Sha Tin College, Hong Kong |
| 7 | Daniel Newton F, Master Brain Academy, UK | Syed Ali R, Beaconhouse School, Middle Branch, Pakistan | Byung hee C, Saint Louis School, US |
| 8 | Max W, Helen Wilson Public School, Canada | Sai M, India International School, Japan | Lee Y, Cempaka Schools, Malaysia |
| 9 | Aidan S, West Leeming Primary School, Australia | Harish S, India International School, Japan | Edwin See Jun H, Cempaka Schools, Malaysia |
| 10 | Sum yin Tracy M, St Paul's Convent School, Hong Kong | Naunidh S, Thai Sikh International School, Thailand | Mohammed Shaan R, Slough Grammar School, London, U.K |

== 2011 results ==
| | 4–7 Years | 8–10 Years | 11–13 Years | 14–18 Years |
|---|---|---|---|---|
| 1 | Eric Z, Team Australia, Australia | Mason F, Team New Zealand, New Zealand | Kaya G, The Southport School, Australia | David A, Fraser Coast Anglican College, Australia |
| 2 | Vihangi R, Salcombe Prep School, England, U.K | Sai M, India International School, Japan | David M, Aloha College, Marbella, Spain | Tham C, Team Malaysia, Malaysia |
| 3 | Evan M, Stanley Bay School, New Zealand | Edwin V, St Joseph's School, New Zealand | Satvik R, St George's The English International, Cologne, Germany | Tiger Z, Team Malaysia, Malaysia |
| 4 | Andrey M, Laude San Pedro International College, Spain | Sachin Kumar M, Canadian International School, Hong Kong | Harish S, Team India, India | Yeoh K, Team Malaysia, Malaysia |
| 5 | Aditya C, Team United States, US | Muhammad Abdul Mannan, Thorncliffe PS, Canada | Moosa Feroze T, BeaconHouse School System, Pakistan | Edwin See Jun H, Cempaka Schools, Malaysia |
| 6 | Zahid B, Team Pakistan, Pakistan | Willem E, Remarkables Primary School, New Zealand | Sharan M, The Glasgow Academy, UK | Lim C, Cempaka Schools, Malaysia |
| 7 | Michael Z, Holy Family Primary School, Australia | Gordon C, German Swiss International School, Hong Kong | Ahsan A, Beaconhouse School Mandi Bahauddin, Pakistan | Aaron T, Sha Tin College, Hong Kong |
| 8 | Jovanka Vienna S, Bunda Mulia International School, Indonesia | Thomas P, Goulburn Street Primary, Australia | Chong Seng K, Independent School | Siddharth P, Team United States, US |
| 9 | Alldon Garren Tan, Rosyth School, Singapore | Max W, Team Canada, Canada | Aaron H, Team Australia, Australia | Malayandi P, Cempaka Schools, Malaysia |
| 10 | Ali S, Team Pakistan, Pakistan | Daniel Newton F, Master Brain Academy, UK | Anna S, British International School of Ljubljana, Slovenia | Kaan Aykurt, Team Turkey, Turkey |

== 2012 results ==
| | 4–7 Years | 8–10 Years | 11–13 Years | 14–18 Years |
|---|---|---|---|---|
| 1 | Yousuf M, Team Saudi Arabia, Saudi Arabia | Darshan S, The Indian Public School, India | Moosa Feroze T, Beaconhouse School System, Pakistan | Kaya G, Team Australia, Australia |
| 2 | Sandali R, Salcombe Prep School, England, U.K | Oliver P, Balwyn Primary School, Australia | Husnain Ali Abid, FFC Grammar H/S School, Pakistan | Osama Shahid, Beaconhouse School Gujranwala, Pakistan |
| 3 | Daksh C, Team India, India | Thomas P, Goulburn Street Primary, Australia | Karl H, Team Australia, Australia | Zhe W, Team United States, US |
| 4 | Joy J, Team India, India | Rohith N, Team Japan, Japan | David M, Aloha College, Marbella, Spain | Mohammed Shaan R, Slough Grammar School, London, UK |
| 5 | Austin M, AHES School, US | Rishabh K, Team India, India | Joseph T, Team Australia, Australia | Aisya A, Cempaka Schools DH, Malaysia |
| 6 | Douglas G, Pitt Island School, New Zealand | Daniel Newton F, Master Brain Academy, UK | Sachin Kumar M, Canadian International School, Hong Kong | Francis L, Cempaka Schools DH, Malaysia |
| 7 | Joyel G, Ghyllside Primary School, UK | Eric Z, Palmerston District Primary School, Australia | Aaron H, Team Australia, Australia | Angela M, Team Macedonia, Macedonia |
| 8 | Alison K, Canberra Grammar School, Australia | Leon H, Team Australia, Australia | Edwin V, Team New Zealand, New Zealand | Aaron T, Sha Tin College, Hong Kong |
| 9 | Archie G, Pitt Island School, New Zealand | Vihangi R, Salcombe Prep School, England, U.K | Sharan M, The Glasgow Academy, UK | Edwin See Jun H, Cempaka Schools DH, Malaysia |
| 10 | Leow Z, Sri Tenby School, Malaysia | Kangan M, Australian International School | Filip Szary, Team England, UK | Belinda C, Green Bay High School, New Zealand |

== 2013 results ==
| | 4–7 Years | 8–10 Years | 11–13 Years | 14–18 Years |
|---|---|---|---|---|
| 1 | Sandali R, Salcombe Prep School, England, U.K | Rohith N, Global Indian International School, Japan | Ata Cagin K, Ata College, Turkey | Husnain Ali A, FFC Grammar School, Pakistan |
| 2 | Becky L, Undercliffe Public School, Australia | Vihangi R, Salcombe Prep School, England, UK | Meet S, SN Kansagra, India | Aaron H, Team Seaford, Australia |
| 3 | Beykent Doga T, Beykent Doga College, Turkey | Rohidh M, Riyadh, Saudi Arabia | Muhammad Abdul Mannan, Toronto, Canada | Edwin See Jun H, Team Malaysia, Malaysia |
| 4 | Martin E, Izmir Ata Koleji, Turkey | Martin E, Izmir Ata Koleji, Turkey | Choong M, Cempaka School CH, Malaysia | Low C, Cempaka School CH, Malaysia |
| 5 | Tuna Y, Izmir Ata Koleji, Turkey | Yousuef M, Orbit International School (Khobar), Saudi Arabia | Sachin Kumar M, Canadian International School, Hong Kong | Hussain A, Bloomfield Hall Upper School, Pakistan |
| 6 | Tapkac D, Izmir Ata Koleji, Turkey | Aditya C, New Albany Elementary, Albany, US | Filip S, Team England, England | Panayioti K, St Spyridon College, Australia |
| 7 | Abeeha Saud K, Beaconhouse School, Mandi B, Pakistan | Ugo Dos R, American International School of Bucharest, Romania | Hassan Feroze T, Beaconhouse School Mandi B, Pakistan | Hassan Ali A, FFC Grammar School, Pakistan |
| 8 | Usman A, Millennium School Mirpur, Pakistan & Tuna C, Izmir Ata Koleji I, Turkey | Daniyal N, Australian International School, UAE | Karl H, Riverina Anglican College, Australia & Willem E, Remarkables Primary School, New Zealand | Mohammed Shaan R, Team England, England, U.K |
| 9 | | Evan Manning, Team New Zealand, New Zealand | Apoorv Agrawal, Anubhuti School, India | Danial B, Cempaka School CH, Malaysia |
| 10 | Bahar F, Izmir Ata Koleji, Turkey | Chloe Isabella Tsang, Chinese International School, Hong Kong | Benjamin H, McCarthy Catholic College, Australia | Yi Shuen L, Cempaka Schools DH, Malaysia |
...
| 20 | | | | Muralish Clinton, Lyceum International School, Srilanka |

== 2015 Event ==
The 2015 event was held on October 13 – October 15, 2015. There were 10 ages categories: 1 each for grades K-8, and one for grades 9+. The game limit was dropped to 20 games per student. It is possible to play further, but these do not count to ones personal total, only the event total. 169 Million points were scored across Maths, Literacy and Science.

| | Grade K | Grade 1 | Grade 2 | Grade 3 | Grade 4 | Grade 5 | Grade 6 | Grade 7 | Grade 8 | Grade 9+ |
|---|---|---|---|---|---|---|---|---|---|---|
| 1 | Jinansh D, Genius Kid, India | Sarah R, Team Pakistan | Ahmed Feroze T, Team Pakistan | Muhammad S, Beaconhouse School System, Mandi Bahauddin, Pakistan | Abeeha S, Beaconhouse School System, Mandi Bahauddin, Pakistan | Austin M, Steuart Weller, US | Bonnie L, Undercliffe Public School, Australia | Hashir Feroze T, Team Pakistan | Dara H, Team Australia | Ali Saud K, Beaconhouse School System, Mandi Bahauddin, Pakistan |
| 2 | Vilaxi S Geniud Kid, India | Yashdeep S Genius Kid, India | Bilge Kaan S Takev Karsiyaka, Turkey | Emmanuel A Ladybird Nursery/Primary School, Nigeria | Kainat F Beaconhouse School System, Mandi Bahauddin, Pakistan | Filbert Ephraim WMGC New Life Christian Academy | Sydny L Cempaka Damansara | Iman F Team Pakistan, Pakistan | Jayden L Cempaka Damansara | Benjamin H Team Australia |

== Official National Mathletics Challenges leading up to World Maths Day ==
Throughout the year Mathletics host several National Mathletics challenges in the lead up to World Maths Day. These challenges and the winners list are as follows:

=== 2010 Results ===
The American Math Challenge :Winner- Alek K, Haddonfields schools, Null.

The Australian Maths Challenge :Winner- Parker C, Home Education, Queensland

The Canadian Math Challenge :Winner- Shekar S, North Kipling Junior Middle School, ON.

The European Schools Maths Challenge:Winner- Anna S, British International School of Ljubljana, Slovenia.

The Middle East Schools Maths Challenge:Winner- Zakria Y, Australian International School, UAE.

The NZ Maths Challenge :Winner- Vlad B, St Mary's School, Christchurch.

The South African Maths Challenge :Winner- Jaden D, Wilton House, GT.

The UK Four Nations Maths Challenge :Winner- Sharan Maiya, Glasgow Academy, Scotland.

=== 2011 results ===
The American Math Challenge :Winner- Sayan Das, Team USA, Minnesota.

The Australian Maths Challenge :Winner- Tatiana Devendranath, Team Australia, VIC.

The Canadian Math Challenge :Winner- Tom.L, MPS, Etobicoke.

The European Schools Maths Challenge:Winner-

The Middle East Schools Maths Challenge:Winner- .

The NZ Maths Challenge :Winner- Thomas Graydon, Pitt Island School.

The Pakistan Maths Challenge: Winner- Dilsher A, The International School of Choueifat.

The South African Maths Challenge :Winner- Jaden D, Team ZAF.

The UK Four Nations Maths Challenge :Winner- Sharan Maiya, Glasgow Academy, Scotland, United Kingdom.

=== 2012 results ===
The American Math Challenge :Winner- Zhe W, Team USA, Massachusetts

The Latin American Math Challenge :Winner- Adriana Donis, Colegio Internacional Montessori, Guatemala

The Australian Maths Challenge :Winner- Aaron Herrmann,, Seaford 6–12 School, South Australia

The Canadian Math Challenge :Winner- Hanting C, Maywood Community School, Canada

The European Schools Maths Challenge:Winner- Filip Szary, Team Poland

The Middle East Schools Maths Challenge:Winner- Pushp raj P, MES Indian School, Qatar

The NZ Maths Challenge :Winner- Willem Ebbinge, Remarkables Primary School, Otago

The Pakistan Maths Challenge: Winner- Husnain Ali Abid, FFC Grammar H/S School, Punjab

The South African Maths Challenge :Winner- Bradley P, Merrifield College, Eastern Cape

The UK Four Nations Maths Challenge :Winner- Ryan Conlan, Team GBR, Scotland

=== 2014 results ===
The Nigerian Maths Challenge Winner Ayomide Adebanjo, Xplanter Private School, Lagos
