= Mathletics (educational software) =

Mathematics education program

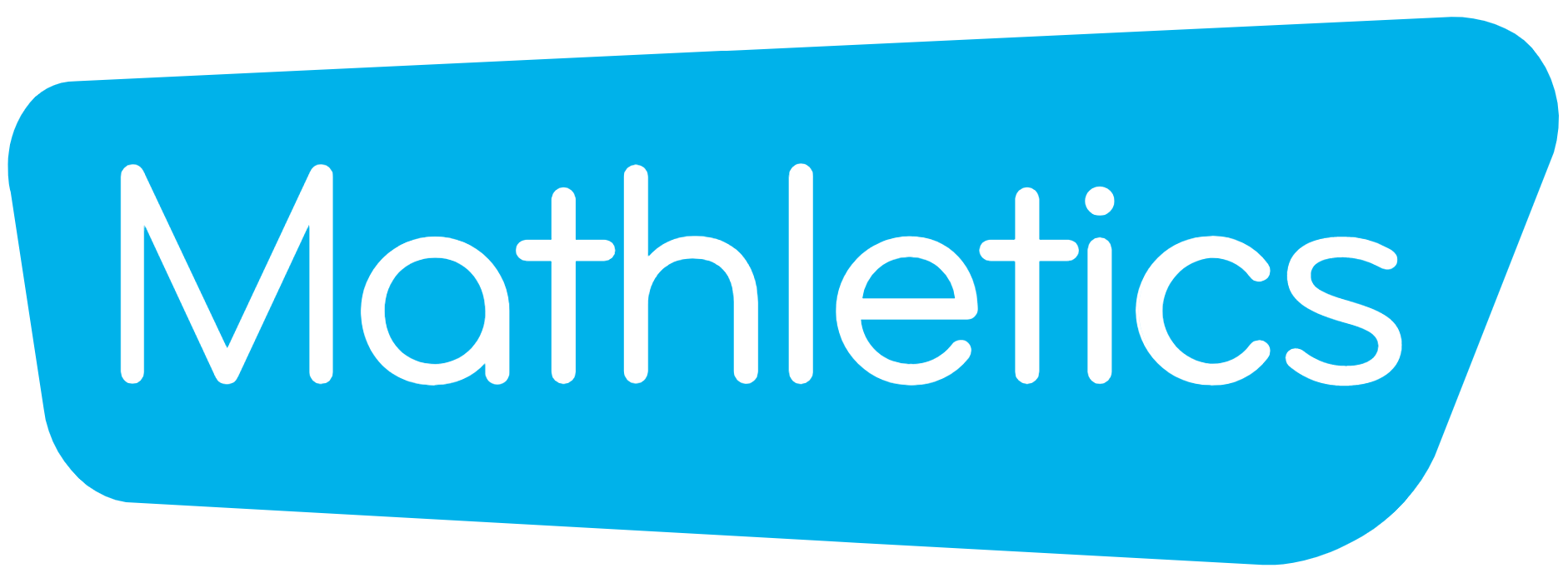
The official logo for Mathletics.

Mathletics is an online educational website which launched in 2005. The website operates through a subscription model, offering access at an individual and school level. Online users, known as 'Mathletes', have access to math quizzes and challenges, and can participate in a real-time networked competition known as 'Live Mathletics'. A customisable avatar visually represents each player in the 'Live Mathletics' competitions. 'Credits' are awarded through the completion of quizzes and tasks, which can be used to customise their avatar's clothing and aesthetics.

In 2007, Mathletics started World Maths Day, and in 2010, World Maths Day obtained a Guinness World Record for the Largest Online Maths Competition. As of 2023, Mathletics caters to 3.2 million users worldwide and 14,000 schools.

== History ==
Mathletics was established as a Personal Learning Environment (PLE) application in 2005 by 3P Learning, catering for Australian schools. The website is structured to facilitate an engagement with students from K-12 educational level, and offers various visual resources in their interactive and online Web 2.0 appropriation of the Australian Curriculum. Though initially based around this curriculum, Mathletics broadened its offices as well as its student and teacher audiences to various other countries residing in North America, Europe, Asia and the Middle East, adapting to those regions' various school curricula. The US and Canadian version of the website aligns with state-based educational she po standards including the Common Core and Texas Essential Knowledge and Skills (TEKS) from high school into kindergarten. The UK version of the website follows the various National Curricula within Britain, comprising Foundation Stage to Key Stage 5. Both the Middle Eastern and Asian versions of the website adopt and reflect International Curricula, and offer an entire translation of the English course.

Mathletics is a project by 3P Learning, an organisation that creates education applications such as Reading Eggs and Mathseeds. Mathletics heavily anchors their teaching styles within the "Primary" section of their website through the lens of 'visual learning'; employing a vast array of colours combined with cartoon imagery to create a "captivating" website aesthetic in an effort to appease the juvenile temperament of students under twelve years old. The site offers animated tutorials and learning support that display animated adolescent characters offering mathematic tips and answers to questions. The website currently offers 1200 unique questions, that have been individually tailored to suit each user's mathematic comprehension. Students are encouraged to participate in Mathematic activities which host up to 20 questions related to a certain topic. Once a student answers a question, the website recognises its completion and then adapts to the "student's progress in understanding", leading to questions that may be more complex in difficulty. At the completion of each topic, students are offered the opportunity to take a 'Topic Test' which summates the hardest questions in the past activities.

A certificate award is presented to a student once they have earned 1000 points within a week. Ten points are awarded per correct activity answer in a regular activity. Twenty points are awarded per correct answer in a 'Topic Test'.

The 'Primary Section' of the website is accessible via Tablet device, and is available for offline use if the user doesn't have sufficient Wi-Fi. All points garnered whilst on offline will be synchronised onto online servers once the individuals access the website online.

=== Secondary Students ===
Mathletics believes that "secondary school is a whole new world and a new school demands an older, more study-focused interface for new students". As a result, the "Secondary" section of the website available to students doesn't reflect the juvenile decor that saturates the "Primary" section of the website, replacing it with a "more study-based" interface. Further, this "Secondary" area of the website exclusively promotes the use of a student progress system through use of a 'Traffic Light System', which categorises a user's understanding of a mathematical topic into three, colour-based, identifiable sections:

1. Green = 86% to 100% correct marks.
2. Orange = 50% to 85% correct marks.
3. Red = 0% to 49% correct marks.

Alongside this colour-coded progress guide secondary students have access to "adaptive practice activities with animated support, plus interactive and video content" as well as a library of various printable eBooks. Secondary Students also are offered the option to personally customise the website's interface from a range of differing backgrounds, in an effort to suit their "learning needs". The collection of backgrounds encompass pictures of natural environments, sporting fields, pictures of live animals and vibrant pattens of colours.

Alike to the "Primary' section, accumulative points are awarded for the completion of questions in activities. Secondary Students also have access to 'Topic Tests' which summate the most difficult questions of the topic.

The "Secondary Students" section of the website is also reachable on a Tablet device, and can be accessed for offline use. The same process of offline synchronisation to the online profile is also applied in the 'Secondary Students" section of the website.

=== Early Learners ===
The 'Early Learners Numeracy' section of the site offers a series of multimedia resources that are designed to support students aged from four to seven. The section's mascot feature animated 'Numbeanies', drawn and designed to appeal to infants. These 'Numbeanies' present younger users with a series of flash cards that represent numbers as "collections, numerals and words".

The overall purpose of the Early Learners section is to be entertaining, and provide the basic foundations of mathematics through the guise of interactive games and videos.

=== Teachers ===
Users that identify as teachers have access to a 'Mathletics Teacher Console' which manages their classroom's collective progress, as well as providing insight into each individual student's progress also. The teacher console delineates live data analysis of each student's progress, represented via colour-coded visuals, in an attempt to provide teachers greater agency in assigning "targeted and personalised learning pathways" for the class. The teacher console provides teachers with tools and instruments to manage classes, create custom mathematical learning courses to suit different and various learning groups, and bestow students with multimedia sources that will assist them answer the questions assigned. Teachers have the option to select mandatory assignments and activities to be completed by their students. These assignments must be completed before a student participate in games of Live Mathletics or other activities.

The teacher console is multi-platformed and available on various media devices including Tablet and Mobile.

=== Avatar ===
Each individual subscriber of Mathletics must create an identifiable Avatar. The customisable Avatar template provided by Mathletics is a portrait-view shot of a head and face in the foreground, combined with an animated environment in the background. This online persona is known as the user's 'Mathlete'. The avatar does not have to represent a user's actual facial features, however the avatar's design will represent the user against others in competitions of 'Live Mathletics'. The Avatar can be updated/altered through the 'Face Maker' interface via purchasing upgrades with credits that have been earned from completing tasks and competitions of 'Live Mathletics'.

Mathletics operates via a credits-based incentive system, awarding students who have completed quizzes or competitions of 'Live Mathletics' with in-app online credits that replicate virtual currency, and can be used to purchase aesthetic upgrades to their 'Mathlete'. The Mathletics website will award an obligatory 10 credits to user for participation in a quiz or competition, as an added bonus to their base gained score.

=== Live Mathletics ===
The option to participate in real-time, live networked mathematic competitions known as 'Live Mathletics' are offered to users on the Mathletics Website. The primary objective to win is for users to complete as many addition, subtraction and multiplication problems as possible before the one-minute timer ends. Users must select which difficulty level they wish to compete in, which vary on a difficulty scale from 1-10 (1 being the easiest, 10 being the hardest) that dictates the complexity of the questions asked by the website. The user who answers the most correctly, wins.

'Live Mathletics' incorporates a "Who's Online" panel which allows users to read a live feed of other students in their class that are currently online and engaged with 'Live Mathletics'.

== Reception ==
The overall reception of Mathletics as an educational software has been generally positive. Technology-based reviewer TeachWire appraised Mathletics, calling it an "intuitive and engaging resource; one that's bound to improve the learners' skills, knowledge and ability in maths, especially in numerical skills and speed". EducationWorld named Mathletics a "tremendous resource" and an educational website that "injected(ed) a little competitions into lessons".

Critically, Macquarie University's leading mathematic education expert, Dr Michael Cavanagh described Mathletics to SMH as a "drill and practise" learning software. He believes that "this type of program needs to be complemented - and this is when the teacher comes in, to develop a deeper and broader understanding". He then substantiates his belief that Mathletics is only "one piece of the puzzle" in regards to mathematical informative learning with "If all students do is stuff on Mathletics then that's a pretty shallow approach".
