= Reading Eggs =

Subscription based education program for children 2–13

- Website type: Educational
- Available in: English
- Country of origin: Australia
- Owner: 3P Learning
- Industry: Reading
- Website: Australia: readingeggs.com.au International: readingeggs.com
- Commercial: No
- Launched: 2008; 18 years ago
- Current status: Active

Reading Eggs, stylised as ABC Reading Eggs in Australia, is a subscription-based digital literacy program aimed at improving reading skills in children aged 2 to 13. Owned by 3P Learning, Reading Eggs comprises five programs catering to different age groups, Reading Eggs Junior (ages 2–4), Reading Eggs (ages 3–7), Fast Phonics (ages 5–10), Reading Eggspress (ages 7-13) and Mathseeds (ages 3-11).

In 2019, Reading Eggs faced criticism for an inappropriate spelling lesson. In 2020, concerns were raised it resembled a video game and lacking in instruction for children with disabilities.

A 2020 study suggested the program's computer-based adaptive tasks and texts can improve reading self-efficacy and engagement. A 2022 study reported positive effects on learners' phonological development when teachers incorporated Reading Eggs into their instructional practices.

Reading Eggspress was reported to show promise as a supplementary tool for enhancing reading comprehension in children with autism, in a 2020 thesis study.
