= Willem Klein =

Dutch mental calculator (1912–1986)

Willem Klein (4 December 1912 – 1 August 1986), also known as Wim Klein or under his stage names Pascal and Willy Wortel, was a Dutch mental calculator, famous for ability to perform very complicated calculations in his head very fast. On 27 August 1976, he calculated the 73rd root of a 500-digit number in 2 minutes and 43 seconds. This feat was recorded by the Guinness Book of Records.

In 1986, Klein was killed with a knife attack within his home in Amsterdam. A suspect was arrested, but he was released due to insufficient evidence. Klein's murder remains unsolved.

== Background ==
Wim Klein was born in Amsterdam on 4 December 1912 to Jewish parents, Henry Klein, GP, and Emma Cohen. Klein had a rough childhood because his father wanted him to become a Doctor (as his father was), even though he was quite opposed to the idea. In addition to this pressure, his mother also committed suicide in 1929. In 1932, when Klein finished high school, despite his strong desire to pursue his love of mathematics, he gave in to his father's demands and enrolled at the University of Amsterdam for Medicine. He graduated with a bachelor's degree in 1935. His father died in 1937. Although Klein passed the first part of his doctoral exam, he eventually gave up. It was around this time that he discovered his homosexuality. Both Klein and his older brother Leo were regularly examined by a neurologist in Amsterdam for their incredible computing capabilities. Stokvis labeled Wim as an "auditory calculator," and his brother Leo as a "visual calculator."

When the Germans invaded in May 1940, Klein began working in a Jewish hospital and continued with his doctoral studies in 1941. In 1942, though, he had to hide; his brother was captured and taken to the Sobibór extermination camp, where he died. After the war, Klein returned to his doctoral studies. Additionally, he also worked in circuses in France, Belgium, and the Netherlands, performing fast calculations as an act, often under the stage name 'Pascal'. He lived a fairly nomadic lifestyle and performed in such shows until 1952.

In 1952, Klein was hired as a scientific calculator at the Mathematisch Centrum (English: Mathematical Center) in Amsterdam. In 1954, he attended the International Congress of Mathematicians in Amsterdam, which inspired him to return to performing and embrace his nomadic lifestyle. He performed internationally again for a few years until he was hired by CERN in 1958. However, as computers became more powerful in the 1960s and physicists began programming more, Klein found himself often used as a mascot for CERN, to perform calculations for visitors, which he found disheartening.

== Later years and murder ==
In 1975, the commemoration of the 700th anniversary of Amsterdam made him feel homesick, leading to his early retirement from CERN in 1976. He continued to perform calculations for shows, this time with the stage name "Willy Wortel". However, he became increasingly interested in breaking records, trying hard to improve his time and beat new records. This continued until 1 August 1986, when Klein's housekeeper found him dead in his home in Amsterdam, brutally murdered with a knife. Although a young man was arrested, there was no evidence linking him to the case, and he was soon released. The murder remains unsolved.

== In popular culture ==
Neurologist Oliver Sacks quoted Klein in his discussion of numerical savants to demonstrate their intimate understanding of their calculations: “Numbers are friends for me, more or less. It doesn’t mean the same for you, does it, 3,844? For you it’s just a three and an eight and a four and a four. But I say, ‘Hi, 62 squared!’”. Klein's quote has become popular with mathematicians and those writing about human calculators at large.

== See also ==
- List of unsolved murders (1980–1999)
