= Mental calculation =

Arithmetical calculations using only the human brain

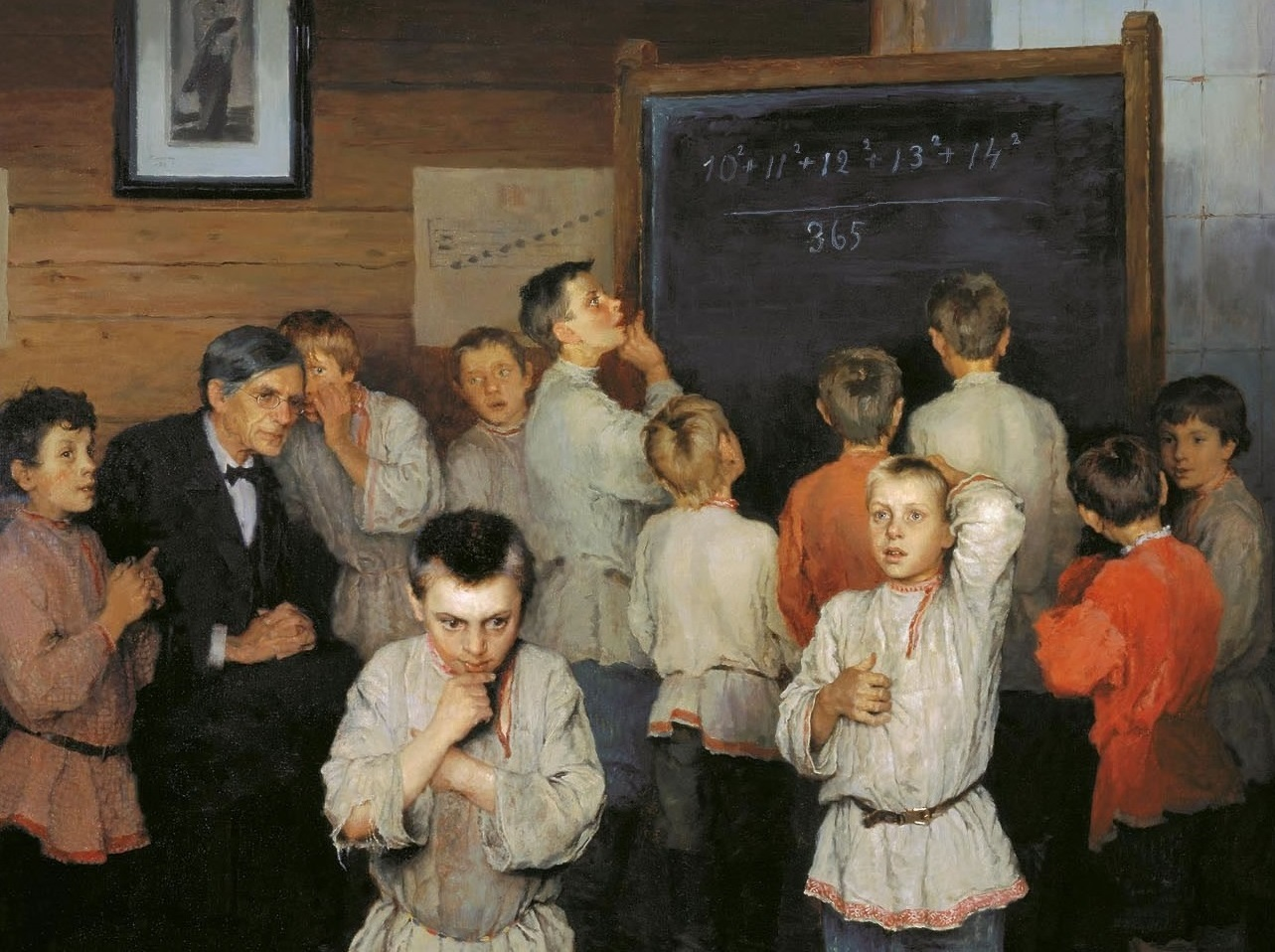
Mental calculation has long been a component of mathematical education.

Mental calculation (also known as mental computation) consists of arithmetical calculations made by the mind, within the brain, with no help from any supplies (such as pencil and paper) or devices such as a calculator. People may use mental calculation when computing tools are not available, when it is faster than other means of calculation (such as conventional educational institution methods), or even in a competitive context. Mental calculation often involves the use of specific techniques devised for specific types of problems. Many of these techniques take advantage of or rely on the decimal numeral system.

Capacity of short-term memory is a necessary factor for the successful acquisition of a calculation, specifically perhaps, the phonological loop, in the context of addition calculations (only). Mental flexibleness contributes to the probability of successful completion of mental effort - which is a concept representing adaptive use of knowledge of rules or ways any number associates with any other and how multitudes of numbers are meaningfully associative, and certain (any) number patterns, combined with algorithms process.

It was found during the eighteenth century that children with powerful mental capacities for calculations developed either into very capable and successful scientists and/or mathematicians or, instead became a counterexample, having experienced personal retardation. People with an unusual fastness with reliably correct performance of mental calculations of sufficient relevant complexity are prodigies or savants. By the same token, in some contexts and at some time, such an exceptional individual would be known as a lightning calculator, or a genius.

In a survey of children in England it was found that mental imagery was used for mental calculation. By neuro-imaging, brain activity in the parietal lobes of the right hemisphere was found to be associated with mental imaging.

The teaching of mental calculation can be an element of schooling, with a focus in some teaching contexts on mental strategies.

== Exceptional calculational ability ==
An exceptional ability is mental calculation such as adding, subtracting, multiplying or dividing large numbers.

Skilled calculators were necessary in research centers such as CERN before the advent of modern electronic calculators and computers. See, for instance, Steven B. Smith's 1983 book The Great Mental Calculators, or the 2016 book Hidden Figures and the film adapted from it.

== Competitions ==
=== World Cup ===
The Mental Calculation World Cup is an international competition that attempts to find the world's best mental calculator, and also the best at specific types of mental calculation, such as addition, multiplication, square root or calendar reckoning. The first Mental Calculation World Cup took place in 2004. It is an in-person competition that occurs every other year in Germany. It consists of four different standard tasks --- addition of ten ten-digit numbers, multiplication of two eight-digit numbers, calculation of square roots, and calculation of weekdays for given dates --- in addition to a variety of "surprise" tasks. The last edition was organized in September 2024 and won by Aaryan Nitin Shukla, who successfully defended his title to become two time World Champion.

=== Mental Calculation & Speed Reading Olympiad ===
The Mind Sports Olympiad has staged annual world championships since 1998.

=== Memoriad – World Memory ===
The first international Memoriad was held in Istanbul, Turkey, in 2008. The second Memoriad took place in Antalya, Turkey, on 24–25 November 2012. 89 competitors from 20 countries participated. Awards and money prizes were given for 10 categories in total; of which 5 categories had to do about Mental Calculation (Mental addition, Mental Multiplication, Mental Square Roots (non-integer), Mental Calendar Dates calculation and Flash Anzan). The third Memoriad was held in Las Vegas, USA, from November 8, 2016 through November 10, 2016.

=== Mind Sports Organisation ===
The Mind Sports Organisation recognizes six grandmasters of mental calculation: Robert Fountain (1999), George Lane (2001), Gert Mittring (2005), Chris Bryant (2017), Wenzel Grüß (2019), and Kaloyan Geshev (2022), and one international master, Andy Robertshaw (2008). In 2021, Aaryan Nitin Shukla became the youngest champion ever at an age of just 11 years.

=== World records ===
Shakuntala Devi from India has been often mentioned on the Guinness World Records. Aaryan Nitin Shukla from India currently holds 9 Guinness World Records in various disciplines of mental calculation. Neelakantha Bhanu Prakash from India has been often mentioned on the Limca Book of Records for racing past the speed of a calculator in addition. Sri Lankan-Malaysian performer Yaashwin Sarawanan was the runner-up in 2019 Asia's Got Talent.

=== 13th root ===
Extracting the 13th root of a number is a famous category for the mental calculation world records. The challenge consists of being given a large perfect 13th power (possibly over 100 digits) and asked to return the number that, when taken to the 13th power, equals the given number. For example, the 13th root of 8,192 is 2 and the 13th root of 96,889,010,407 is 7.

Extracting the 13th root has certain properties. One is that the 13th root of a number is much smaller: a 13th root will have approximately 1/13th the number of digits. Thus, the 13th root of a 100-digit number only has 8 digits and the 13th root of a 200-digit number will have 16 digits. Furthermore, the last digit of the 13th root is always the same as the last digit of the power. For the 13th root of a 100-digit number there are 7,992,563 possibilities, in the range 41,246,264 – 49,238,826. This is considered a relatively easy calculation. There are 393,544,396,177,593 possibilities, in the range 2,030,917,620,904,736 – 2,424,462,017,082,328, for the 13th root of a 200-digit number. This is considered a difficult calculation.

==== 100-digit numbers ====
The Guinness Book of World Records has published records for extracting the 13th root of a 100-digit number. All world records for mentally extracting a 13th root have been for numbers with an integer root:

- The first record was 23 minutes by Herbert B. de Grote (Mexico) on October 5, 1970.
- In 1981, Wim Klein (Netherlands) set a record of 88.8 seconds at the National Laboratory for High Energy Physics in Tsukuba, Japan.
- Gert Mittring calculated it in 39 seconds.
- Alexis Lemaire has broken this record with 13.55 seconds in 2002. This is the last official world record for extracting the 13th root of a 100-digit number.
- Mittring attempted to break this record with 11.8 seconds in November 2004. However, this was not counted as official as the Guinness Book of World Records had stopped recognizing records for root extraction of random numbers, due to the difficulty of standardizing the challenge.
- Lemaire broke this record unofficially 6 times, twice within 4 seconds: the best was 3.625 seconds in December 2004.

==== 200-digit numbers ====
Lemaire has also set the first world record for the 13th root of a 200-digit number: 513.55 seconds and 742 attempts on April 6, 2005, and broken it with 267.77 seconds and 577 attempts on June 3, 2005.

- The same day, Lemaire has also set in front of official witnesses an unofficial record of 113 seconds and 40 attempts.
- On February 27, 2007, he set a world record of 1 minute and 47 seconds
- He broke this record on July 24, 2007, with a time of 1 minute and 17 seconds (77.99 seconds) at the Museum of History of Science, University of Oxford, UK.
- Lemaire broke his record on November 15, 2007, with a time of 72.4 seconds
- Lemaire broke his record on December 10, 2007, with a time of 70.2 seconds

== Media ==
=== Literary ===
- Frank Herbert's novel Dune, specially trained mental calculators known as Mentats have replaced mechanical computers completely. Several important supporting characters in the novel, namely Piter De Vries and Thufir Hawat, are Mentats. Paul Atreides was originally trained as one without his knowledge. However, these Mentats do not specialize in mathematical calculations, but in total recall of many different kinds of data. For example, Thufir Hawat is able to recite various details of a mining operation, including the number of various pieces of equipment, the people to work them, the profits and costs involved, etc. In the novel he is never depicted as doing actual academic mathematical calculations. Mentats were valued for their capacity as humans to store data, because "thinking machines" are outlawed.
- Roald Dahl's novel Matilda, the lead character is portrayed having exceptional computational skills as she computes her father's profit without the need for paper computations. During class (she is a first-year elementary school student), she does large-number multiplication problems in her head almost instantly.
- Andrew Jackson "Slipstick" Libby is a calculating prodigy in Robert A. Heinlein's Sci-Fi story Methuselah's Children.
- Haruki Murakami's novel Hard-Boiled Wonderland and the End of the World, a class of mental calculators known as Calcutecs perform cryptography in a sealed-off portion of their brains, the results of which they are unable to access from their normal waking consciousness.

=== Film ===
==== Fiction ====
===== Twentieth century =====
====== 1980s ======
- In the 1988 movie Rain Man, Raymond Babbitt, an autistic man with savant syndrome, can mentally calculate large numbers, amongst other abilities.

====== 1990s ======
- In the 1991 movie Little Man Tate, Fred Tate in the audience blurts out the answer during a mental calculation contest.
- In the 1997 sci-fi thriller Cube, one of the prisoners, Kazan, is mentally disabled and is later revealed to be a savant who is able to calculate prime factors in his head.
- In 1998 Darren Aronofsky's film Pi, Maximillian Cohen is asked a few times by a young child with a calculator to do large multiplications and divisions in his head, which he promptly does, correctly.
- In 1998 film Mercury Rising, a 9-year-old autistic savant with prodigious math abilities cracks a top secret government code.

===== Twenty-first century =====
====== 2000s ======
- In the 2006 film Stranger than Fiction, the main character, Harold Crick, is able to perform rapid arithmetic at the request of his co-workers.

====== 2010s ======
- In the 2012 film Safe, a female child math genius is kidnapped to be used by the Chinese Triad.
- In the 2016 film The Accountant, Christian Wolff is a high-functioning autistic man who tracks insider financial deceptions for numerous criminal organizations.
- In the 2017 film Gifted, an intellectually gifted seven-year-old, Mary Adler, becomes the subject of a custody battle between her uncle and grandmother.

==== Bio ====
- In 2020, an eponymous film Shakuntala Devi on the life of Indian mathematician, writer, astrologer and mental calculator Shakuntala Devi.

=== Television ===
- In the USA Network legal drama Suits, the main character, Mike Ross, is asked to multiply considerably large numbers in his head to impress two girls, and subsequently does so.
- In the Fox television show Malcolm in the Middle, Malcolm Wilkerson displays astounding feats of automatic mental calculation, which causes him to fear his family will see him as a "freak", and causes his brother to ask, "Is Malcolm a robot?".
- In the 1990s NBC TV sitcom NewsRadio, reporter/producer Lisa Miller can mentally calculate products, quotients, and square roots effortlessly and almost instantly, on demand.
- In the 2007 sitcom The Big Bang Theory, the main character, Sheldon Cooper, calculates numbers and solutions in his head for his theoretical physics research.
- In the 2008 show Breaking Bad, the main character, Walter White, is shown to calculate most of the numbers to his deals, such as profit and production costs, purely within his head.
- In another Fox television show, Fringe, in the third episode of the third season, Olivia and her fellow Fringe Division members encounter an individual with severe cognitive impairment who has been given experimental nootropics and as a result has become a mathematical genius. The individual is able to calculate hundreds of equations simultaneously, which he leverages to avoid being returned to his original state of cognitive impairment.
- In the 2014 TV series Scorpion, Sylvester Dodd, a gifted mathematician and statistician with an IQ of 175; he is described as a "human calculator".

=== Animation ===
In the 2009 Japanese animated film Summer Wars, the main character, mathematical genius Kenji Koiso, is able to mentally break purely mathematical encryption codes generated by the OZ virtual world's security system. He can also mentally calculate the day of the week a person was born, based on their birthday.

== See also ==
- Child prodigy
- Doomsday rule for calculating the day of the week
- Hypercalculia
- Mental abacus
- Mnemonist
- Soroban
- Subitizing
